= Timeline of WHL history =

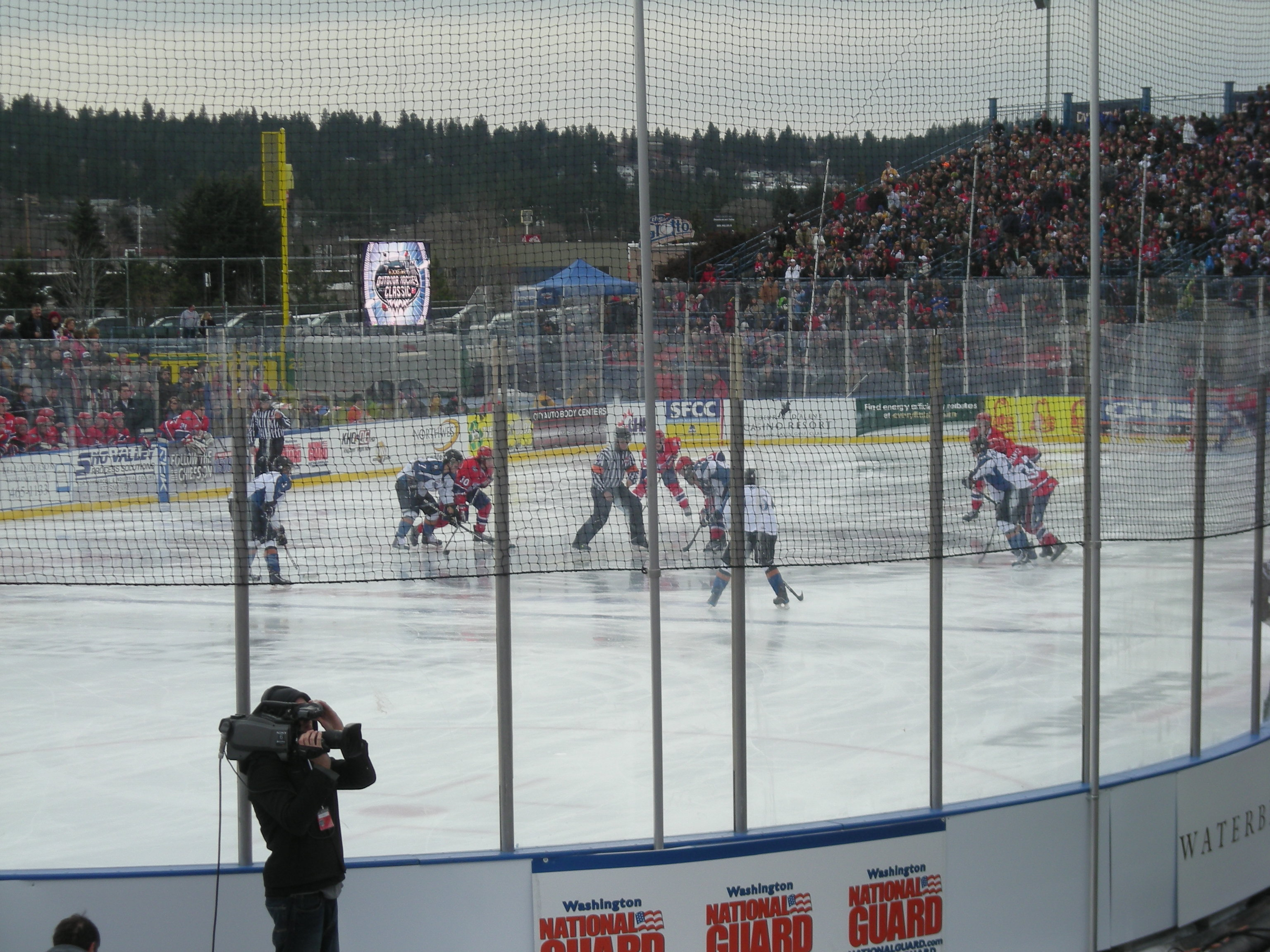
The Spokane Chiefs hosted the Kootenay Ice in the WHL's first outdoor game in January 2011.

This is a timeline of events throughout the history of the Western Hockey League (WHL), which dates back to its founding in 1966. The league was founded by a group of team owners and managers in Saskatchewan and Alberta, including Bill Hunter, Scotty Munro, Del Wilson, and Jim Piggott, who thought a larger western league would help western teams compete for the Memorial Cup against teams from the larger associations in Ontario and Quebec. Since the league's founding, it has expanded to include 22 teams across the four Western Canadian provinces along with the Northwest United States, and it has produced 19 Memorial Cup championship teams.

Ironically, the earliest years of the league were marked by disputes with the Canadian Amateur Hockey Association, the national governing body for junior hockey, which led to teams in the fledgling league being barred from competing for the Memorial Cup for most years prior to 1971. At the outset of the 1970s, those disputes were resolved and junior hockey was reorganized, with the western league recognized as a top tier major junior league.

== 1960s ==
- 1966: League began play as the Canadian Major Junior Hockey League (CMJHL) with seven teams in Saskatchewan and Alberta: the Estevan Bruins, Moose Jaw Canucks, Regina Pats, Saskatoon Blades, Weyburn Red Wings, Calgary Buffaloes, and Edmonton Oil Kings. League not sanctioned by the Canadian Amateur Hockey Association (CAHA) and thus barred from competing for the Memorial Cup.
- 1967: League expands into Manitoba and changes its name to the Western Canada Junior Hockey League (WCJHL). The Calgary Buffaloes renamed the Centennials. The Swift Current Broncos, Flin Flon Bombers, Winnipeg Jets, and Brandon Wheat Kings join the league. League reaches an understanding with CAHA, allowing the WCJHL champion Estevan Bruins to contest the 1968 Memorial Cup.
- 1968: League shortens its name to the Western Canada Hockey League (WCHL). Dispute over age-limits leads to CAHA again revoking its sanction and the ability for WCHL teams to compete for the Memorial Cup. The Regina Pats, Weyburn Red Wings, and Moose Jaw Canucks leave the league to join the re-booted Saskatchewan Junior Hockey League, which was sanctioned to compete for the Memorial Cup. WCHL launches the Canadian Hockey Association to rival the CAHA. Remaining eight WCHL teams are divided into two divisions: East (Flin Flon, Estevan, Winnipeg, Brandon); and West (Edmonton, Calgary, Saskatoon, Swift Current).
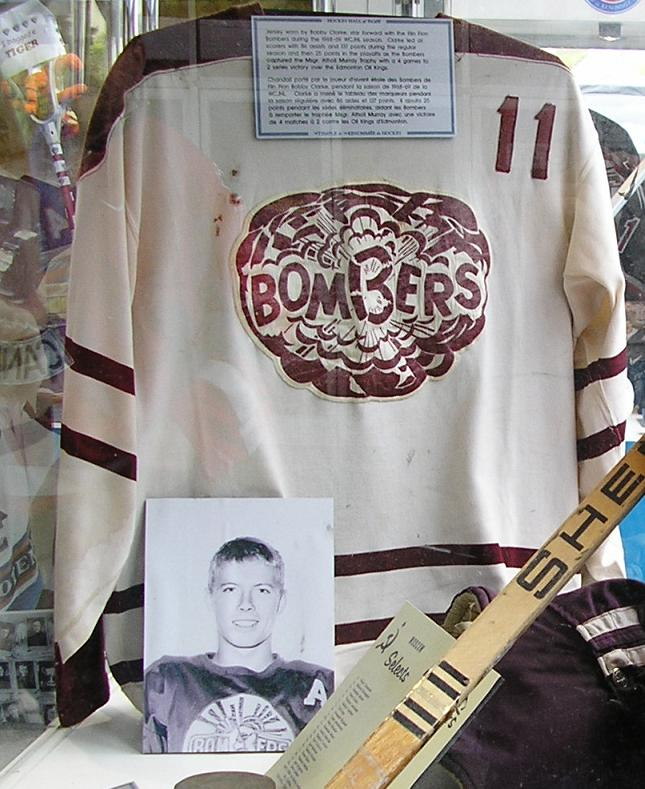
- Bobby Clarke's Flin Flon Bombers jersey, c. 1967, on display.
  1969: League champion Flin Flon Bombers contest the Canadian Hockey Association "National Championship" series—organized to rival the Memorial Cup—against the Western Ontario Junior A Hockey League Champion St. Thomas Barons. Game four is forfeited during the second period by St. Thomas in protest of violent play. Prior to Game 4, Flin Flon led the series 2-games-to-1, and the Bombers, featuring Bobby Clarke and Reggie Leach, are awarded the title. Bombers challenge the Memorial Cup-champion Montreal Junior Canadiens to a match, but the challenge is declined.

== 1970s ==
- 1970: The Regina Pats return to the league and the Medicine Hat Tigers are granted a new franchise. The league reaches a new agreement with CAHA and becomes fully recognized as a top-flight major junior league with the ability to compete for the Memorial Cup, beginning in 1971; the CHA merges with CAHA.
- 1971: League expands into British Columbia to become a fully Western Canadian organization. The Estevan Bruins move and become the New Westminster Bruins, while the Victoria Cougars and Vancouver Nats are both granted franchises. Swift Current Broncos and Saskatoon Blades move to the Eastern Division to balance the league.
- 1972: Memorial Cup format changes to a tournament between the champions of Canada's three major junior leagues—the WCHL, the Ontario Hockey Association, and the Quebec Major Junior Hockey League.
- 1973: Vancouver Nats move and become the Kamloops Chiefs; Winnipeg Jets renamed the Winnipeg Clubs due to confusion with the World Hockey Association (WHA) Winnipeg Jets.
- 1974: The Regina Pats win the first Memorial Cup title for a WCHL representative. Swift Current Broncos move and become the Lethbridge Broncos.
- 1976: League expands into the United States as the Edmonton Oil Kings—facing pressure from the WHA Edmonton Oilers—move and become the Portland Winter Hawks. Winnipeg Clubs renamed the Winnipeg Monarchs. League divides into three divisions: East (Brandon, Saskatoon, Flin Flon, Regina); Central (Medicine Hat, Winnipeg, Lethbridge, Calgary); and West (New Westminster, Kamloops, Portland, Victoria).
- 1977: The New Westminster Bruins win the first of two consecutive Memorial Cups. League expands into Montana and Washington. Calgary Centennials move and become the Billings Bighorns; Kamloops Chiefs move and become the Seattle Breakers. Winnipeg Monarchs move and become the Calgary Wranglers.
- 1978: Following the addition of American teams, the WCHL is renamed the Western Hockey League (WHL). The Flin Flon Bombers move and become a second incarnation of the Edmonton Oil Kings.
- 1979: The Brandon Wheat Kings establish a league record with 125 points on the season; Brandon wins the league title, but loses in the Memorial Cup final. After one season, the new Edmonton Oil Kings move again and become the Great Falls Americans, before the team ceases operations on December 16. The league pares back to two divisions: West (Portland, Victoria, Seattle, New Westminster) and East (Regina, Calgary, Medicine Hat, Billings, Brandon, Lethbridge, Saskatoon, Great Falls).

== 1980s ==
- 1980: Winnipeg Warriors granted a franchise. Great Falls franchise revived as the Spokane Flyers.
- 1981: The Victoria Cougars establish a WHL and Canadian Hockey League record with 60 wins; the team goes on to win the league playoff title, but falls short at the Memorial Cup tournament. New Westminster Bruins move and become the Kamloops Junior Oilers. Spokane Flyers fold on December 2.
- 1982: Billings Bighorns move and become the Nanaimo Islanders. Prince Albert Raiders and Kelowna Wings are granted franchises.
- 1983: Memorial Cup format changes again to include a host participant, bringing the total number of teams to four. Portland serves as the first host with this format, and the Winter Hawks become the first American club to win the Memorial Cup, defeating the OHL-champion Oshawa Generals in the final. Nanaimo Islanders move and become a second incarnation of the New Westminster Bruins.
- 1984: Ray Ferraro establishes a league record with a 108-goal season for the Wheat Kings; on January 5, Ferraro tied the record for goals in a single game, with 7. Winnipeg Warriors move and become the Moose Jaw Warriors. Kamloops Junior Oilers renamed the Kamloops Blazers.
- 1985: Prince Albert Raiders become the fourth WHL team to win the Memorial Cup. Kelowna Wings move and become the Spokane Chiefs. Seattle Breakers renamed the Seattle Thunderbirds.
- 1986: Lethbridge Broncos return to Swift Current. The Broncos team bus crashes en route to a game in Regina, resulting in the deaths of four players—Trent Kresse, Scott Kruger, Chris Mantyka, and Brent Ruff. Portland again hosts the Memorial Cup.
- 1987: Regina Pats player Brad Hornung is paralyzed during a game on March 1, 1987. The incident leads to a rule change making body checking from behind illegal; the following season, the league also renames its award for sportsmanship the Brad Hornung Trophy. Rob Brown establishes a league record with a 212-point season for the Blazers. Medicine Hat Tigers win the first of two consecutive Memorial Cup titles. Calgary Wranglers move and become the Lethbridge Hurricanes.
- 1988: New Westminster Bruins move and become the Tri-City Americans.
- 1989: Saskatoon hosts the Memorial Cup, which features the first all-WHL—and all-Saskatchewan—final between the Blades and the WHL-champion Broncos, who prevail in overtime. The Broncos' victory comes just two and a half years after the team bus crash.

== 1990s ==
- 1991: WHL-champion Spokane Chiefs become the second American team to win the Memorial Cup. Tacoma Rockets granted a franchise.
- 1992: Seattle hosts the Memorial Cup tournament; the WHL-champion Kamloops Blazers win the title. Red Deer Rebels granted a franchise.
- 1994: Kamloops Blazers win their second Memorial Cup in three seasons. Victoria Cougars move and become the Prince George Cougars.
- 1995: Kamloops Blazers host the Memorial Cup and win an unprecedented third in a four-year span. Because the Blazers were also WHL champions, the Brandon Wheat Kings were invited as WHL finalists.
- 1995: Calgary Hitmen are granted a franchise. Tacoma Rockets move and become the Kelowna Rockets. WHL again divides into three divisions: West (Spokane, Tri-City, Kelowna, Seattle, Kamloops, Portland, Prince George), Central (Swift Current, Lethbridge, Medicine Hat, Red Deer, Calgary), and East (Brandon, Prince Albert, Regina, Saskatoon, Moose Jaw).
- 1996: Edmonton Ice are granted a franchise. Swift Current Broncos move to the East Division.
- 1998: Portland Winter Hawks win their second Memorial Cup at the tournament hosted in Spokane. Edmonton Ice move and become the Kootenay Ice.

== 2000s ==
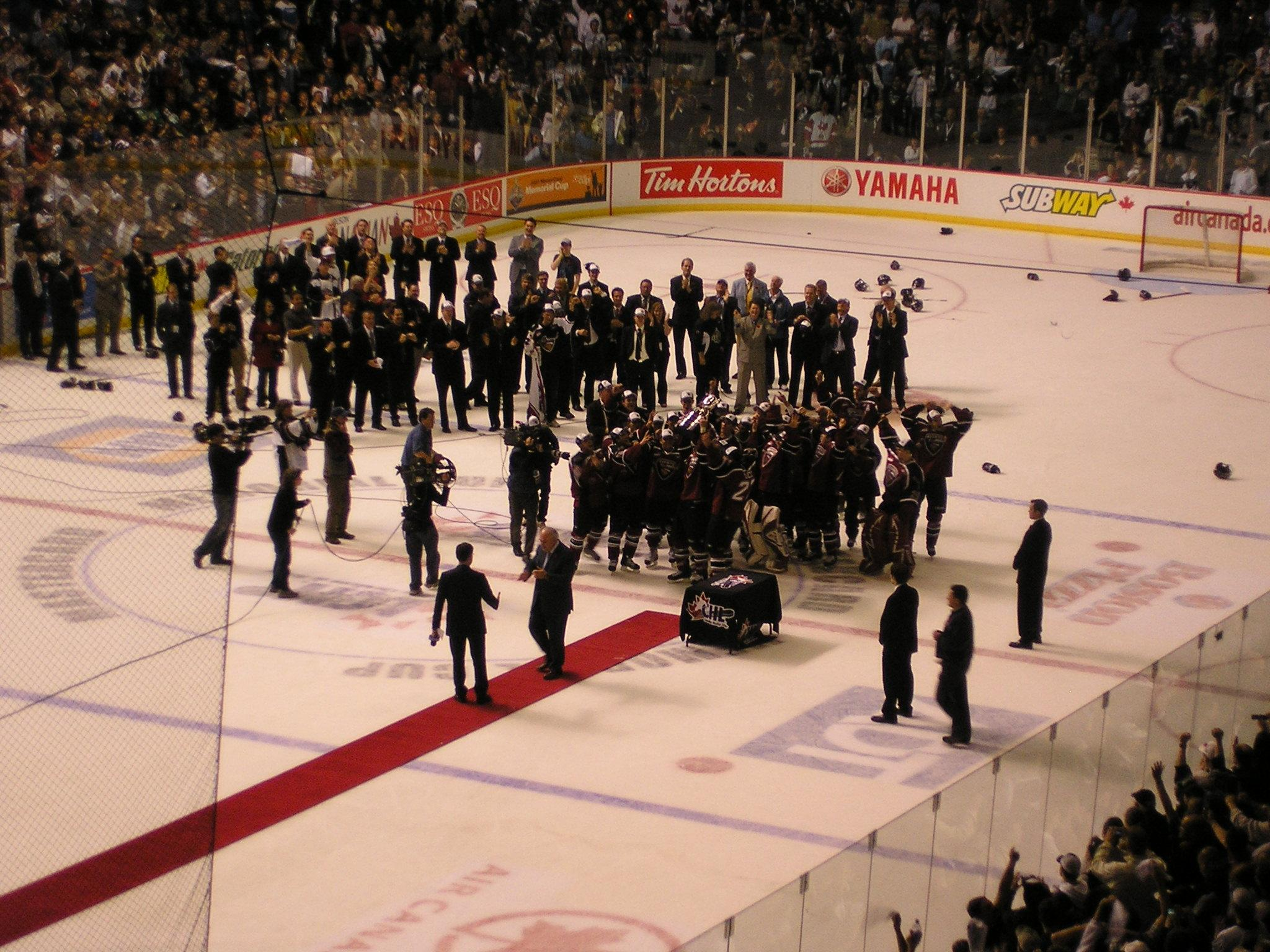
The Vancouver Giants celebrate their 2007 Memorial Cup victory on home ice.

- 2001: Regina hosts the Memorial Cup, which is won by the WHL-champion Red Deer Rebels.
- 2001: Vancouver Giants granted a franchise. WHL divides into two conferences of two divisions each—Eastern Conference: East Division (Brandon, Regina, Moose Jaw, Saskatoon, Prince Albert); Central Division (Red Deer, Swift Current, Lethbridge, Calgary, Medicine Hat); Western Conference: British Columbia Division (Kamloops, Kootenay, Prince George, Kelowna, Vancouver); United States Division (Portland, Spokane, Tri-City, Seattle).
- 2002: Kootenay Ice win the Memorial Cup.
- 2003: Everett Silvertips are granted a franchise.
- 2004: Kelowna Rockets host and win the Memorial Cup tournament.
- 2005: Tri-City Americans' plan to move to Chilliwack is voted down by the league Board of Governors. League instead grants Chilliwack an expansion team named the Chilliwack Bruins, to being play in the 2006–07 WHL season. Tri-City Americans sold to new ownership led by former Tri-City and National Hockey League players Stu Barnes and Olaf Kolzig.
- 2005: League partners with Shaw TV to broadcast WHL games live across Western Canada.
- 2006: Edmonton Oil Kings—paying homage to the city's charter junior team—granted a franchise owned by the Edmonton Investors Group, then the owner of the Edmonton Oilers.
- 2007: Vancouver Giants host and win the Memorial Cup tournament.
- 2008: Spokane Chiefs win the Memorial Cup.

== 2010s ==
- 2010: Brandon hosts the Memorial Cup. The 2010–11 season is the first to be featured in an EA Sports NHL video game, including all teams and rosters.
- 2011: The Spokane Chiefs host the Kootenay Ice in the WHL's first outdoor game on January 15 at Avista Stadium. The Calgary Hitmen host the Regina Pats for an outdoor game at McMahon Stadium in conjunction with the 2011 NHL Heritage Classic on February 21. The Chilliwack Bruins move and become the Victoria Royals.
- 2013: Saskatoon hosts the Memorial Cup tournament.
- 2014. Edmonton Oil Kings win the Memorial Cup.
- 2016: Red Deer hosts the Memorial Cup tournament. The Vancouver Giants move to Langley and begin playing out of the Langley Events Centre; despite the move, the team retains the Vancouver Giants name.
- 2018: Regina hosts the Memorial Cup; the Pats lose in the final.
- 2019: Regina Pats host Calgary Hitmen in the league's third outdoor game, this time at Mosaic Stadium and in conjunction with the 2019 Heritage Classic. The Kootenay Ice move and become the Winnipeg Ice.

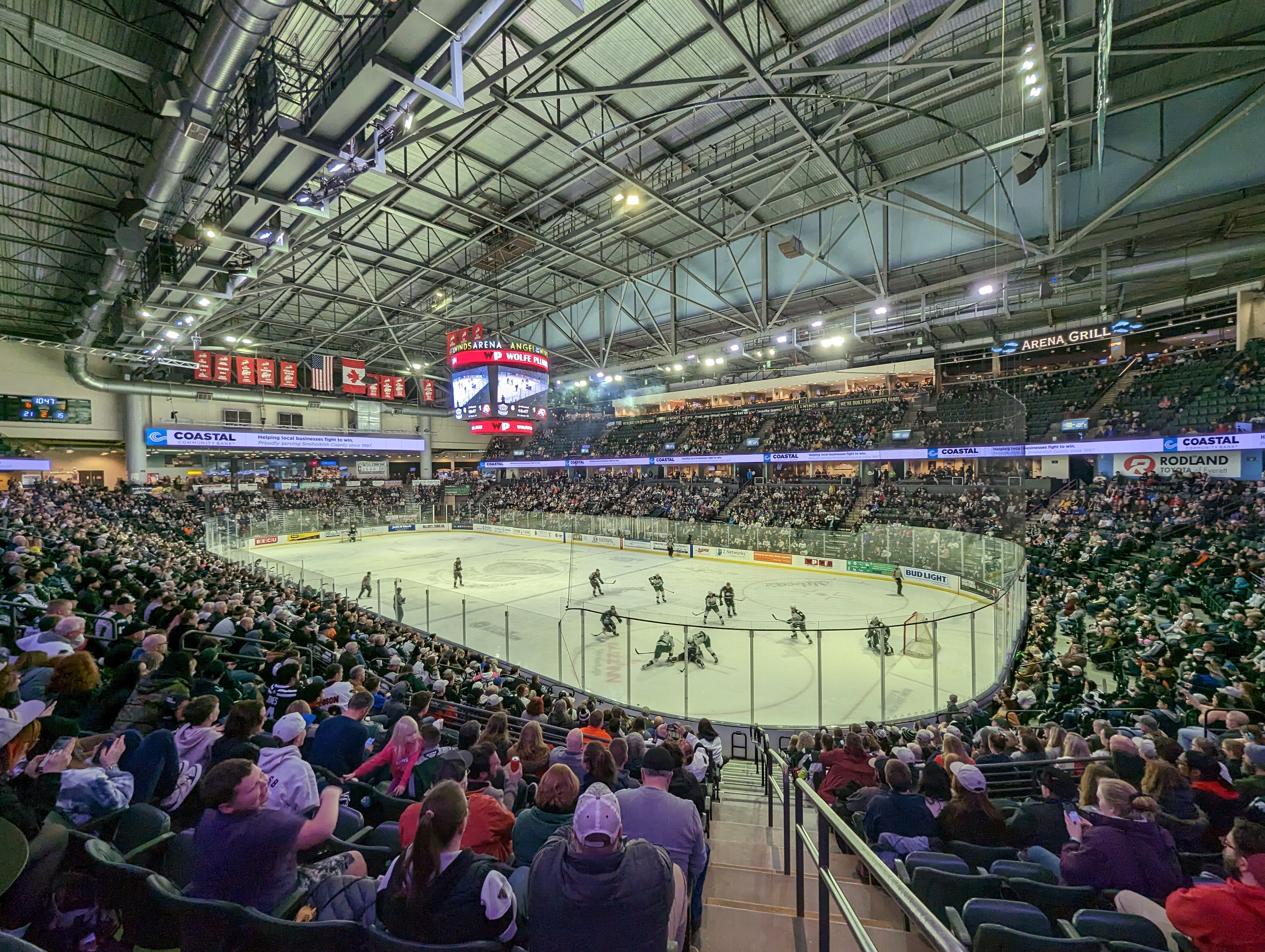
The Everett Silvertips hosting the Portland Winterhawks in 2023.

== 2020s ==
- 2020: Regular season cut short and playoffs ultimately cancelled due to the onset of the COVID-19 pandemic.
- 2020: Connor Bedard becomes the first player to be granted CHL exceptional status in WHL history. Bedard is selected first overall by the Regina Pats in the 2020 draft.
- 2021: Due to the ongoing COVID-19 pandemic, the league institutes a modified 24-game season, with teams playing in-division only. B.C.-based teams played only in Kamloops and Kelowna, while East Division teams played in a bubble in Regina; no spectators are permitted. Plans for a modified playoffs are ultimately abandoned, meaning there was no league champion for two straight years—the Memorial Cup tournament is also cancelled for a second straight year.
- 2022: The league returns to a full schedule and playoffs. The Edmonton Oil Kings win the Ed Chynoweth Cup, the first time it was awarded since the Prince Albert Raiders won in 2019.
- 2023: Kamloops Blazers host Memorial Cup tournament for second time. The Winnipeg Ice are sold and become the Wenatchee Wild, bringing a sixth team to the U.S. Division.
- 2024: The American National Collegiate Athletic Association (NCAA) votes to open eligibility to Canadian Hockey League players for the first time beginning in 2025. Braxton Whitehead of the Regina Pats becomes the first CHL player to commit to playing NCAA hockey with a commitment to the Arizona State Sun Devils.
- 2025: The Penticton Vees of the BCHL are granted expansion status for the WHL, maintaining the Vees moniker. In addition, the league announced that it was seeking ownership for a new franchise in Chilliwack.
- 2026: Kelowna hosts the Memorial Cup tournament.

== Franchise timeline ==
Former member Current member

- Calgary Buffaloes (1966–67) → Calgary Centennials (1967–77) → Billings Bighorns (1977–82) → Nanaimo Islanders (1982–83) → New Westminster Bruins (1983–88) → Tri-City Americans (1988–present)
- Edmonton Oil Kings (1966–76) → Portland Winter Hawks (1976–2009) → Portland Winterhawks (2009–present)
- Estevan Bruins (1966–71) → New Westminster Bruins (1971–81) → Kamloops Junior Oilers (1981–84) → Kamloops Blazers (1984–present)
- Moose Jaw Canucks (1966–68)
- Regina Pats (1966–68, 1970–present)
- Saskatoon Blades (1966–present)
- Weyburn Red Wings (1966–68)
- Brandon Wheat Kings (1967–present)
- Flin Flon Bombers (1967–78) → Edmonton Oil Kings (1978–79) → Great Falls Americans (1979–80) → Spokane Flyers (1980–82)
- Swift Current Broncos (1967–74) → Lethbridge Broncos (1974–86) → Swift Current Broncos (1986–present)
- Winnipeg Jets (1967–73) → Winnipeg Clubs (1973–76) → Winnipeg Monarchs (1976–77) → Calgary Wranglers (1977–87) → Lethbridge Hurricanes (1987–present)
- Medicine Hat Tigers (1970–present)
- Vancouver Nats (1971–73) → Kamloops Chiefs (1973–77) → Seattle Breakers (1977–85) → Seattle Thunderbirds (1985–present)
- Victoria Cougars (1971–94) → Prince George Cougars (1994–present)
- Winnipeg Warriors (1980–84) → Moose Jaw Warriors (1984–present)
- Kelowna Wings (1982–85) → Spokane Chiefs (1985–present)
- Prince Albert Raiders (1982–present)
- Tacoma Rockets (1991–95) → Kelowna Rockets (1995–present)
- Red Deer Rebels (1992–present)
- Calgary Hitmen (1995–present)
- Edmonton Ice (1996–98) → Kootenay Ice (1998–2019) → Winnipeg Ice (2019–2023) → Wenatchee Wild (2023–present)
- Vancouver Giants (2001–present)
- Everett Silvertips (2003–present)
- Chilliwack Bruins (2006–11) → Victoria Royals (2011–present)
- Edmonton Oil Kings (2007–present)
- Penticton Vees (2025–present)

== See also ==
- Ed Chynoweth Cup
- Scotty Munro Memorial Trophy
- List of Memorial Cup champions
- List of WHL seasons
