= Mike Heidt =

Canadian-born German ice hockey player

- Born: November 4, 1963 (age 62) Calgary, Alberta, Canada
- Height: 6 ft 1 in (185 cm)
- Weight: 195 lb (88 kg; 13 st 13 lb)
- Position: Defence
- Shot: Left
- Played for: Los Angeles Kings; Schwenninger ERC; Sportbund DJK Rosenheim; Mannheimer ERC; EV Landshut
- National team: Germany
- NHL draft: 27th overall, 1982; Los Angeles Kings
- Playing career: 1982–1998

Michael Heidt (born November 4, 1963) is a Canadian-born German former professional ice hockey defenceman. He was selected 27th overall by the Los Angeles Kings in the 1982 NHL entry draft and played 6 games with them during the 1983–84 NHL season. The rest of his career, which lasted from 1983 to 1998, was mainly spent in Germany. Internationally Heidt played with the German national team at several tournaments, including the 1992 Winter Olympics, and the 1992 and 1996 World Championships.

== Career statistics ==
=== Regular season and playoffs ===
			Regular season					Playoffs
Season	Team	League	GP	G	A	Pts	PIM	GP	G	A	Pts	PIM
1980–81	Calgary Canucks	AJHL	56	28	63	91	104	—	—	—	—	—
1980–81	Calgary Wranglers	WHL	12	1	3	4	6	22	2	10	12	50
1981–82	Calgary Wranglers	WHL	70	13	44	57	142	9	2	3	5	21
1982–83	Calgary Wranglers	WHL	71	30	65	95	101	15	0	11	11	44
1983–84	Los Angeles Kings	NHL	6	0	1	1	7	—	—	—	—	—
1983–84	New Haven Nighthawks	AHL	54	4	20	24	49	—	—	—	—	—
1984–85	New Haven Nighthawks	AHL	4	0	1	1	0	—	—	—	—	—
1984–85	Toledo Goaldiggers	IHL	4	0	0	0	0	—	—	—	—	—
1984–85	EHC Wetzikon	NLB	13	5	4	9	—	—	—	—	—	—
1984–85	Nova Scotia Oilers	AHL	27	1	7	8	16	5	0	2	2	7
1985–86	Mount Royal College	ACAC	24	19	51	70	84	—	—	—	—	—
1986–87	SV Bayreuth	GER-2	34	24	63	87	67	18	17	21	38	35
1987–88	SV Bayreuth	GER-2	22	16	29	45	51	—	—	—	—	—
1987–88	EC Hedos München	GER-2	22	9	38	47	20	—	—	—	—	—
1988–89	Schwenninger ERC	GER	36	10	22	32	24	2	1	1	2	2
1989–90	Schwenninger ERC	GER	36	7	37	44	26	10	3	8	11	8
1990–91	Sportbund DJK Rosenheim	GER	34	7	32	39	28	11	3	4	7	6
1991–92	Sportbund DJK Rosenheim	GER	43	18	28	46	18	10	2	10	12	2
1992–93	Mannheimer ERC	GER	42	10	27	37	28	8	4	3	7	6
1993–94	Mannheimer ERC	GER	44	14	32	46	28	4	0	2	2	4
1994–95	Adler Mannheim	DEL	37	9	24	33	36	10	1	9	10	6
1995–96	EV Landshut	DEL	48	5	24	29	30	11	3	6	9	6
1996–97	EV Landshut	DEL	36	4	16	20	18	7	1	2	3	8
1997–98	EV Landshut	DEL	15	2	6	8	12	—	—	—	—	—
NHL totals			6	0	1	1	7	—	—	—	—	—
GER totals			235	66	178	244	152	45	13	28	41	28
DEL totals			136	20	70	90	96	28	5	17	22	20

=== International ===
Year	Team	Event	GP	G	A	Pts	PIM
1992	Germany	OLY	8	0	1	1	6
1992	Germany	WC	6	3	0	3	4
1996	Germany	WC	6	1	0	1	4
1996	Germany	WCH	4	0	0	0	0
Senior totals			24	4	1	5	14

== Awards ==
- WHL First All-Star Team – 1983
