= Richard Zemlak =

Canadian ice hockey player

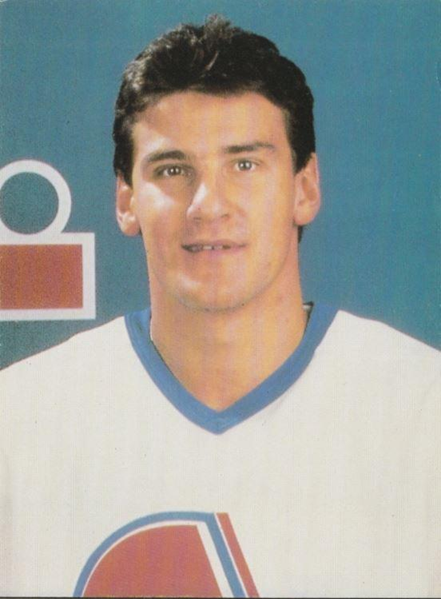
- Born: March 3, 1963 (age 63) Wynyard, Saskatchewan, Canada
- Height: 6 ft 2 in (188 cm)
- Weight: 190 lb (86 kg; 13 st 8 lb)
- Position: Right wing
- Shot: Right
- Played for: Quebec Nordiques; Minnesota North Stars; Pittsburgh Penguins; Calgary Flames
- NHL draft: 209th overall, 1981; St. Louis Blues
- Playing career: 1980–1994

Richard Andrew Zemlak (born March 3, 1963) is a Canadian former professional ice hockey forward who played 5 seasons in the National Hockey League for the Quebec Nordiques, Minnesota North Stars, Pittsburgh Penguins and Calgary Flames. He currently works as a realtor in Lakeville, Minnesota. Zemlak also played for Klagenfurter AC in Austria for a brief time in 1990/91.

== Playing career ==
Zemlak was drafted in the 10th round, 209th overall by the St. Louis Blues in the 1981 NHL entry draft.

When asked about Zemlak, Herb Brooks commented on his strong work ethic, "He always brought his lunch bucket".

== Career statistics ==
| | | | Regular Season | | | | | Playoffs |
| Season | Team | League | GP | G | A | Pts | PIM | GP | G | A | Pts | PIM |
|---|---|---|---|---|---|---|---|---|---|---|---|---|
| 1978–79 | Melville Millionaires | SJHL | — | — | — | — | — | — | — | — | — | — |
| 1980–81 | Spokane Flyers | WHL | 72 | 19 | 19 | 38 | 132 | 4 | 1 | 1 | 2 | 6 |
| 1981–82 | Spokane Flyers | WHL | 26 | 9 | 20 | 29 | 113 | — | — | — | — | — |
| 1981–82 | Winnipeg Warriors | WHL | 2 | 1 | 2 | 3 | 0 | — | — | — | — | — |
| 1981–82 | Medicine Hat Tigers | WHL | 41 | 11 | 20 | 31 | 70 | — | — | — | — | — |
| 1981–82 | Salt Lake Golden Eagles | CHL | 6 | 0 | 0 | 0 | 2 | 1 | 0 | 0 | 0 | 0 |
| 1982–83 | Medicine Hat Tigers | WHL | 51 | 20 | 17 | 37 | 119 | — | — | — | — | — |
| 1982–83 | Nanaimo Islanders | WHL | 18 | 2 | 8 | 10 | 50 | — | — | — | — | — |
| 1983–84 | Toledo Goaldiggers | IHL | 45 | 8 | 19 | 27 | 101 | — | — | — | — | — |
| 1983–84 | Montana Magic | CHL | 14 | 2 | 2 | 4 | 17 | — | — | — | — | — |
| 1984–85 | Fredericton Express | AHL | 16 | 3 | 4 | 7 | 59 | — | — | — | — | — |
| 1984–85 | Muskegon Lumberjacks | IHL | 64 | 19 | 18 | 37 | 221 | 17 | 5 | 4 | 9 | 68 |
| 1985–86 | Fredericton Express | AHL | 58 | 6 | 5 | 11 | 305 | 3 | 0 | 0 | 0 | 49 |
| 1985–86 | Muskegon Lumberjacks | IHL | 3 | 1 | 2 | 3 | 36 | — | — | — | — | — |
| 1986–87 | Quebec Nordiques | NHL | 20 | 0 | 2 | 2 | 47 | — | — | — | — | — |
| 1986–87 | Fredericton Express | AHL | 28 | 9 | 6 | 15 | 201 | — | — | — | — | — |
| 1987–88 | Minnesota North Stars | NHL | 54 | 1 | 4 | 5 | 307 | — | — | — | — | — |
| 1988–89 | Kalamazoo Wings | IHL | 2 | 1 | 3 | 4 | 22 | — | — | — | — | — |
| 1988–89 | Muskegon Lumberjacks | IHL | 18 | 5 | 4 | 9 | 55 | 8 | 1 | 1 | 2 | 35 |
| 1988–89 | Minnesota North Stars | NHL | 3 | 0 | 0 | 0 | 13 | — | — | — | — | — |
| 1988–89 | Pittsburgh Penguins | NHL | 31 | 0 | 0 | 0 | 135 | 1 | 0 | 0 | 0 | 10 |
| 1989–90 | Pittsburgh Penguins | NHL | 19 | 1 | 5 | 6 | 43 | — | — | — | — | — |
| 1989–90 | Muskegon Lumberjacks | IHL | 61 | 17 | 39 | 56 | 263 | 14 | 3 | 4 | 7 | 105 |
| 1990–91 | Salt Lake Golden Eagles | IHL | 59 | 14 | 20 | 34 | 194 | 3 | 0 | 1 | 1 | 14 |
| 1991–92 | Calgary Flames | NHL | 5 | 0 | 1 | 1 | 42 | — | — | — | — | — |
| 1991–92 | Salt Lake Golden Eagles | IHL | 60 | 5 | 14 | 19 | 204 | 3 | 0 | 0 | 0 | 0 |
| 1992–93 | Milwaukee Admirals | IHL | 62 | 3 | 9 | 12 | 299 | 2 | 1 | 1 | 2 | 6 |
| 1993–94 | Milwaukee Admirals | IHL | 61 | 3 | 8 | 11 | 243 | 2 | 0 | 0 | 0 | 16 |
| NHL totals | | | 132 | 2 | 12 | 14 | 587 | 1 | 0 | 0 | 0 | 10 |
