= Dan Hodgson =

Canadian ice hockey player

- Born: August 29, 1965 (age 60) Fort Vermilion, Alberta, Canada
- Height: 5 ft 10 in (178 cm)
- Weight: 175 lb (79 kg; 12 st 7 lb)
- Position: Centre
- Shot: Right
- Played for: HC Fribourg-Gottéron; EHC Basel; ZSC Lions; HC Davos; EC Hedos München; EHC Lustenau; Vancouver Canucks; Toronto Maple Leafs
- NHL draft: 83rd overall, 1983; Toronto Maple Leafs
- Playing career: 1985–2005

Daniel W. "Hodge" Hodgson (born August 29, 1965) is a Canadian former professional ice hockey player of Cree heritage who played 114 National Hockey League games for the Toronto Maple Leafs and Vancouver Canucks. He won the Memorial Cup as a member of the Prince Albert Raiders in 1985. After his NHL career ended, he moved to Switzerland, where he played in the Nationalliga A from 1994 until his retirement in 2005.

== Career statistics ==
=== Regular season and playoffs ===
			Regular season					Playoffs
Season	Team	League	GP	G	A	Pts	PIM	GP	G	A	Pts	PIM
1980–81	Cowichan Valley Capitals	BCHL	48	41	55	96	26	—	—	—	—	—
1980–81	Spokane Flyers	WHL	2	0	0	0	0	—	—	—	—	—
1981–82	Cowichan Valley Capitals	BCHL	46	45	75	120	30	—	—	—	—	—
1982–83	Prince Albert Raiders	WHL	72	56	74	130	66	—	—	—	—	—
1983–84	Prince Albert Raiders	WHL	66	62	119	181	65	5	5	3	8	7
1984–85	Prince Albert Raiders	WHL	64	70	112	182	86	13	10	26	36	32
1984–85	Prince Albert Raiders	MC	—	—	—	—	—	5	1	13	14	6
1985–86	Toronto Maple Leafs	NHL	40	13	12	25	12	—	—	—	—	—
1985–86	St. Catharines Saints	AHL	22	13	16	29	15	13	3	9	12	14
1986–87	Newmarket Saints	AHL	20	7	12	19	16	—	—	—	—	—
1986–87	Vancouver Canucks	NHL	43	9	13	22	25	—	—	—	—	—
1987–88	Vancouver Canucks	NHL	8	3	7	10	2	—	—	—	—	—
1987–88	Fredericton Express	AHL	13	8	18	26	16	—	—	—	—	—
1988–89	Vancouver Canucks	NHL	23	4	13	17	25	—	—	—	—	—
1988–89	Milwaukee Admirals	IHL	47	27	55	82	47	11	6	7	13	10
1989–90	HC Fribourg–Gottéron	NDA	27	16	18	34	20	3	4	0	4	10
1989–90	EHC Lustenau	AUT	2	1	1	2	0	—	—	—	—	—
1990–91	EC Hedos München	1.GBun	22	10	17	27	12	—	—	—	—	—
1991–92	EC Hedos München	1.GBun	44	24	22	46	31	—	—	—	—	—
1991–92	HC Ajoie	SUI.2	—	—	—	—	—	1	1	1	2	0
1992–93	SC Langnau	SUI.2	36	33	39	72	35	—	—	—	—	—
1993–94	Lausanne HC	SUI.2	8	6	7	13	6	—	—	—	—	—
1994–95	HC Davos	NDA	35	23	27	50	32	5	1	2	3	4
1995–96	HC Davos	NDA	33	17	32	49	61	5	3	4	7	2
1996–97	HC Davos	NDA	46	29	32	61	69	6	2	3	5	2
1997–98	HC Davos	NDA	28	11	29	40	18	—	—	—	—	—
1998–99	ZSC Lions	NDA	43	10	39	49	42	7	2	7	9	6
1999–2000	ZSC Lions	NLA	40	11	30	41	64	15	3	5	8	10
2000–01	ZSC Lions	NLA	35	6	16	22	50	12	2	7	9	20
2001–02	ZSC Lions	NLA	41	12	19	31	55	16	2	6	8	49
2002–03	ZSC Lions	NLA	41	10	12	22	36	10	0	2	2	6
2003–04	EHC Basel	NLA	37	6	14	20	26	—	—	—	—	—
2004–05	HC Fribourg–Gottéron	NLA	3	0	0	0	0	—	—	—	—	—
NHL totals			114	29	45	74	64	—	—	—	—	—
NDA/NLA totals			409	151	268	419	473	79	19	36	55	109

=== International ===
Year	Team	Event	GP	G	A	Pts	PIM
1984	Canada	WJC	7	1	4	5	4
1985	Canada	WJC	7	5	2	7	0
Junior totals			14	6	6	12	4

== Awards ==
- WHL East Second All-Star Team – 1984
- WHL East First All-Star Team – 1985

Preceded by Mario Lemieux	CHL Player of the Year; 1985	Succeeded by Luc Robitaille
