= Bob Rouse =

Canadian ice hockey player

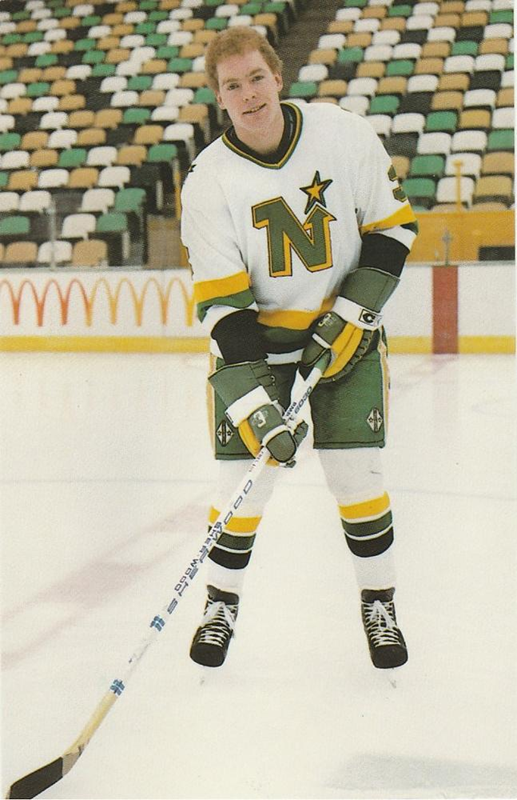
- Born: June 18, 1964 (age 62) Surrey, British Columbia, Canada
- Height: 6 ft 2 in (188 cm)
- Weight: 220 lb (100 kg; 15 st 10 lb)
- Position: Defence
- Shot: Right
- Played for: Minnesota North Stars; Washington Capitals; Toronto Maple Leafs; Detroit Red Wings; San Jose Sharks
- NHL draft: 80th overall, 1982; Minnesota North Stars
- Playing career: 1983–2000

Robert John Rouse (born June 18, 1964) is a Canadian former professional ice hockey player. He is a two-time Stanley Cup champion, winning in back to back years with the Detroit Red Wings in 1997 and 1998.

== Playing career ==
A prototypical stay-at-home defenceman, Rouse was drafted in 1982 by the Minnesota North Stars. After playing parts of six seasons with the North Stars, Rouse was traded to the Washington Capitals at the trade deadline of the 1988–89 NHL season in the deal that also sent Dino Ciccarelli to the Capitals. His steady and tough style of defensive play helped guide the Capitals to their first semifinals appearance, in 1990.

During the middle of the 1990–91 season he was traded to the Toronto Maple Leafs, along with Peter Zezel, in exchange for Al Iafrate. Rouse joined the Detroit Red Wings in 1994 as a free agent. He had arthroscopic surgery in February 1994 but returned and helped them in two of their Stanley Cup wins (1997 and 1998), one of which involved topping one of his former clubs, the Capitals. Rouse moved on to play with the San Jose Sharks in 1998–99 and retired during the 1999–2000 season after the Sharks released him.

In 1,061 NHL games, Rouse had 37 goals, 181 assists, and 1,559 penalty minutes. He served as a full-time alternate captain with the Maple Leafs, and as part-time alternate captain with the Capitals and Red Wings.

== Career statistics ==
=== Regular season and playoffs ===
			Regular season					Playoffs
Season	Team	League	GP	G	A	Pts	PIM	GP	G	A	Pts	PIM
1980–81	Billings Bighorns	WHL	70	0	13	13	116	5	0	0	0	2
1981–82	Billings Bighorns	WHL	71	7	22	29	209	5	0	2	2	10
1982–83	Nanaimo Islanders	WHL	29	7	20	27	86	—	—	—	—	—
1982–83	Lethbridge Broncos	WHL	42	8	30	38	82	20	2	13	15	55
1982–83	Lethbridge Broncos	M-Cup	—	—	—	—	—	3	1	2	3	10
1983–84	Lethbridge Broncos	WHL	71	18	42	60	101	5	0	1	1	28
1983–84	Minnesota North Stars	NHL	1	0	0	0	0	—	—	—	—	—
1984–85	Minnesota North Stars	NHL	63	2	9	11	113	—	—	—	—	—
1984–85	Springfield Indians	AHL	8	0	3	3	6	—	—	—	—	—
1985–86	Minnesota North Stars	NHL	75	1	14	15	151	3	0	0	0	0
1986–87	Minnesota North Stars	NHL	72	2	10	12	179	—	—	—	—	—
1987–88	Minnesota North Stars	NHL	74	0	12	12	168	—	—	—	—	—
1988–89	Minnesota North Stars	NHL	66	4	13	17	124	—	—	—	—	—
1988–89	Washington Capitals	NHL	13	0	2	2	36	6	2	0	2	4
1989–90	Washington Capitals	NHL	70	4	16	20	123	15	2	3	5	47
1990–91	Washington Capitals	NHL	47	5	15	20	65	—	—	—	—	—
1990–91	Toronto Maple Leafs	NHL	13	2	4	6	10	—	—	—	—	—
1991–92	Toronto Maple Leafs	NHL	79	3	19	22	97	—	—	—	—	—
1992–93	Toronto Maple Leafs	NHL	82	3	11	14	130	21	3	8	11	29
1993–94	Toronto Maple Leafs	NHL	63	5	11	16	101	18	0	3	3	29
1994–95	Detroit Red Wings	NHL	48	1	7	8	36	18	0	3	3	8
1995–96	Detroit Red Wings	NHL	58	0	6	6	48	7	0	1	1	4
1996–97	Detroit Red Wings	NHL	70	4	9	13	58	20	0	0	0	55
1997–98	Detroit Red Wings	NHL	71	1	11	12	57	22	0	3	3	16
1998–99	San Jose Sharks	NHL	70	0	11	11	44	6	0	0	0	6
1999–2000	San Jose Sharks	NHL	26	0	1	1	19	—	—	—	—	—
NHL totals			1,061	37	181	218	1,559	136	7	21	28	198

=== International ===
Year	Team	Event	GP	G	A	Pts	PIM
1987	Canada	WC	4	0	0	0	4

== Awards ==
- WHL Second All-Star Team – 1983
- WHL East First All-Star Team – 1984

== See also ==
- List of NHL players with 1,000 games played
