= Darrel Anholt =

Canadian ice hockey player

- Born: November 23, 1962 (age 63) Amisk, Alberta, Canada
- Height: 6 ft 3 in (191 cm)
- Weight: 195 lb (88 kg; 13 st 13 lb)
- Position: Defence
- Shot: Left
- Played for: Chicago Black Hawks
- NHL draft: 54th overall, 1981; Chicago Black Hawks
- Playing career: 1982–1985

Darrel Anholt (born November 23, 1962) is a Canadian retired professional ice hockey defenceman who played in one National Hockey League game for the Chicago Black Hawks during the 1983–84 season, on November 6, 1983, against the New Jersey Devils. The rest of his career, which lasted from 1982 to 1985, was spent in the minor leagues.

== Career statistics ==
=== Regular season and playoffs ===
			Regular season					Playoffs
Season	Team	League	GP	G	A	Pts	PIM	GP	G	A	Pts	PIM
1979–80	Red Deer Rustlers	AJHL	50	2	14	16	147	—	—	—	—	—
1980–81	Calgary Wranglers	WHL	72	5	23	28	286	22	1	7	8	55
1981–82	Calgary Wranglers	WHL	64	10	29	39	294	9	1	4	5	16
1982–83	Springfield Indians	AHL	80	2	18	20	109	—	—	—	—	—
1983–84	Chicago Black Hawks	NHL	1	0	0	0	0	—	—	—	—	—
1983–84	Springfield Indians	AHL	80	13	21	34	142	4	0	1	1	2
1984–85	Milwaukee Admirals	IHL	82	5	22	27	125	—	—	—	—	—
NHL totals			1	0	0	0	0	—	—	—	—	—
AHL totals			160	15	39	54	251	4	0	1	1	2

== See also ==
- List of players who played only one game in the NHL
