= Del Wilson Trophy =

The Del Wilson Trophy is presented annually to the Western Hockey League's goaltender judged to be the best at his position. It is named after Del Wilson for his many years of service to both the Regina Pats and the league. Wilson was an owner, governor, and general manager of the Pats, and served six years as chairman of the board of the WHL. He led the WHL into a partnership with Ontario and Quebec Major Junior Leagues.

Previously called the WHL Top Goaltender Award, it was given to the league's goals against average leader.

== Winners ==
WHL Top Goaltender Award
Season	Player	Team
1966–67	Ken Brown	Moose Jaw Warriors
1967–68	Chris Worthy	Flin Flon Bombers
1968–69	Ray Martyniuk	Flin Flon Bombers
1969–70	Ray Martyniuk	Flin Flon Bombers
1970–71	Ed Dyck	Calgary Centennials
1971–72	John Davidson	Calgary Centennials
1972–73	Ed Humphreys	Saskatoon Blades
1973–74	Garth Malarchuk	Calgary Centennials
1974–75	Bill Oleschuk	Saskatoon Blades
1975–76	Carey Walker	New Westminster Bruins
1976–77	Glen Hanlon	Brandon Wheat Kings
1977–78	Bart Hunter	Portland Winter Hawks
1978–79	Rick Knickle	Brandon Wheat Kings
1979–80	Kevin Eastman	Victoria Cougars
1980–81	Grant Fuhr	Victoria Cougars
1981–82	Mike Vernon	Calgary Wranglers
1982–83	Mike Vernon	Calgary Wranglers
1983–84	Ken Wregget	Lethbridge Broncos
1984–85	Troy Gamble	Medicine Hat Tigers
1985–86	Mark Fitzpatrick	Medicine Hat Tigers
1986–87^{1}	(West) Dean Cook	Kamloops Blazers
	(East) Kenton Rein	Prince Albert Raiders
Del Wilson Trophy
Season	Player	Team
1987–88	Troy Gamble	Spokane Chiefs
1988–89	Danny Lorenz	Seattle Thunderbirds
1989–90	Trevor Kidd	Brandon Wheat Kings
1990–91	Jamie McLennan	Lethbridge Hurricanes
1991–92	Corey Hirsch	Kamloops Blazers
1992–93	Trevor Robins	Brandon Wheat Kings
1993–94	Norm Maracle	Saskatoon Blades
1994–95	Paxton Schafer	Medicine Hat Tigers
1995–96	David Lemanowicz	Spokane Chiefs
1996–97	Brian Boucher	Tri-City Americans
1997–98	Brent Belecki	Portland Winter Hawks
1998–99	Cody Rudkowsky	Seattle Thunderbirds
1999–2000	Bryce Wandler	Swift Current Broncos
2000–01	Dan Blackburn	Kootenay Ice
2001–02	Cam Ward	Red Deer Rebels
2002–03	Josh Harding	Regina Pats
2003–04	Cam Ward	Red Deer Rebels
2004–05	Jeff Glass	Kootenay Ice
2005–06	Justin Pogge	Calgary Hitmen
2006–07	Carey Price	Tri-City Americans
2007–08	Chet Pickard	Tri-City Americans
2008–09	Chet Pickard	Tri-City Americans
2009–10	Martin Jones	Calgary Hitmen
2010–11	Darcy Kuemper	Red Deer Rebels
2011–12	Tyler Bunz	Medicine Hat Tigers
2012–13	Patrik Bartosak	Red Deer Rebels
2013–14	Jordon Cooke	Kelowna Rockets
2014–15	Taran Kozun	Seattle Thunderbirds
2015–16	Carter Hart	Everett Silvertips
2016–17	Carter Hart	Everett Silvertips
2017–18	Carter Hart	Everett Silvertips
2018–19	Ian Scott	Prince Albert Raiders
2019–20	Dustin Wolf	Everett Silvertips
2020–21	Dustin Wolf	Everett Silvertips
2021–22	Dylan Garand	Kamloops Blazers
2022–23	Thomas Milic	Seattle Thunderbirds
2023–24	Brett Mirwald	Vancouver Giants
2024–25	Max Hildebrand	Prince Albert Raiders
2025–26	Joshua Ravensbergen	Prince George Cougars

- Blue background denotes also named CHL Goaltender of the Year

^{1}The WHL handed out separate awards for the East and West divisions.

== See also ==
- CHL Goaltender of the Year
- Jim Rutherford Trophy - Ontario Hockey League Goaltender of the Year
