= Vern Smith (ice hockey) =

Canadian ice hockey player

- Born: May 30, 1964 (age 60); Lethbridge, Alberta, Canada
- Height: 6 ft 1 in (185 cm)
- Weight: 190 lb (86 kg; 13 st 8 lb)
- Position: Defence
- Shot: Left
- Played for: New York Islanders
- NHL draft: 2nd Round, 42nd overall, 1982; New York Islanders
- Playing career: 1983–1992

Vernon Smith (born May 30, 1964) is a Canadian retired professional ice hockey defenceman who played in one National Hockey League game for the New York Islanders during the 1984–85 NHL season.

== Career statistics ==
			Regular season					Playoffs
Season	Team	League	GP	G	A	Pts	PIM	GP	G	A	Pts	PIM
1981–82	Lethbridge Broncos	WHL	72	5	38	43	73	12	0	2	2	8
1982–83	Lethbridge Broncos	WHL	30	2	10	12	54	—	—	—	—	—
1982–83	Nanaimo Islanders	WHL	42	6	21	27	62	—	—	—	—	—
1983–84	New Westminster Bruins	WHL	69	13	44	57	94	9	6	6	12	12
1983–84	Indianapolis Checkers	CHL	—	—	—	—	—	7	0	0	0	4
1984–85	New York Islanders	NHL	1	0	0	0	0	—	—	—	—	—
1984–85	Springfield Indians	AHL	76	6	20	26	115	4	0	2	2	9
1985–86	Springfield Indians	AHL	55	3	11	14	83	—	—	—	—	—
1986–87	Springfield Indians	AHL	41	1	10	11	58	—	—	—	—	—
1987–88	Springfield Indians	AHL	64	5	22	27	78	—	—	—	—	—
1988–89	Springfield Indians	AHL	80	3	26	29	121	—	—	—	—	—
1989–90	Binghamton Whalers	AHL	17	3	2	5	14	—	—	—	—	—
1989–90	Phoenix Roadrunners	IHL	48	4	19	23	37	—	—	—	—	—
1990–91	Albany Choppers	IHL	46	5	15	20	48	—	—	—	—	—
1990–91	New Haven Nighthawks	AHL	9	0	1	1	2	—	—	—	—	—
1991–92	New Haven Nighthawks	AHL	4	0	0	0	5	—	—	—	—	—
1991–92	Capital District Islanders	AHL	17	1	5	6	6	—	—	—	—	—
1991–92	Phoenix Roadrunners	IHL	16	1	2	3	25	—	—	—	—	—
1991–92	Erie Panthers	ECHL	8	3	5	8	6	—	—	—	—	—
NHL totals			1	0	0	0	0	—	—	—	—	—
AHL totals			363	22	97	119	482	4	0	2	2	9
IHL totals			110	10	36	46	110	—	—	—	—	—

== See also ==
- List of players who played only one game in the NHL
