= Daniel Kunce =

German ice hockey player

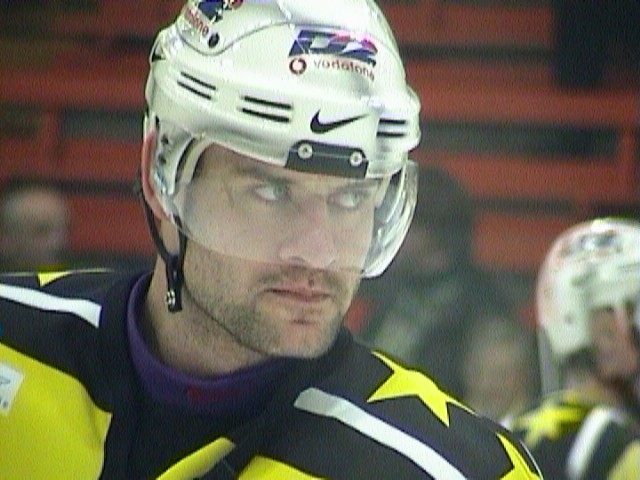
- Daniel Kunce in 2001

Personal information
- National team: Germany
- Born: 17 July 1971 (age 53); Šumperk, Czechoslovakia

Sport
- Sport: Ice hockey

Daniel Kunce (born 17 July 1971) is a Czech-born ice hockey player representing Germany, where he was based at club level for almost his entire career. He competed in the men's tournaments at the 1998 Winter Olympics and the 2002 Winter Olympics. His twin brother Jiří and son Daniel Jr also played the sport at a high level.

== Career statistics ==
=== Regular season and playoffs ===
			Regular season					Playoffs
Season	Team	League	GP	G	A	Pts	PIM	GP	G	A	Pts	PIM
1990–91	TJ DS Olomouc	TCH	31	5	7	12	12	—	—	—	—	—
1990–91	ESV Kaufbeuren	DEU.2	22	5	5	10	14	—	—	—	—	—
1991–92	ESV Kaufbeuren	1.GBun	43	7	18	25	33	—	—	—	—	—
1992–93	ESV Kaufbeuren	1.GBun	42	8	12	20	75	3	0	0	0	0
1993–94	Hedos München	1.GBun	21	3	3	6	35	—	—	—	—	—
1993–94	ESV Kaufbeuren	1.GBun	20	2	4	6	15	4	0	0	0	2
1994–95	Kaufbeurer Adler	DEL	43	7	12	19	24	4	1	1	2	2
1995–96	Kaufbeurer Adler	DEL	47	8	11	19	65	3	1	0	1	4
1996–97	Kaufbeurer Adler	DEL	41	7	8	15	60	—	—	—	—	—
1997–98	Nürnberg Ice Tigers	DEL	45	3	14	17	42	4	0	0	0	27
1998–99	Nürnberg Ice Tigers	DEL	37	4	8	12	62	8	3	2	5	0
1999–2000	Nürnberg Ice Tigers	DEL	47	2	9	11	40	—	—	—	—	—
2000–01	Nürnberg Ice Tigers	DEL	49	6	11	17	63	—	—	—	—	—
2001–02	Krefeld Pinguine	DEL	54	5	13	18	36	3	0	0	0	2
2002–03	Krefeld Pinguine	DEL	40	4	9	13	38	14	1	1	2	6
2003–04	Krefeld Pinguine	DEL	48	2	4	6	52	—	—	—	—	—
2004–05	Krefeld Pinguine	DEL	50	3	14	17	52	—	—	—	—	—
2005–06	Krefeld Pinguine	DEL	42	2	18	20	113	5	0	1	1	8
2006–07	Krefeld Pinguine	DEL	44	3	15	18	78	2	0	0	0	2
2007–08	Krefeld Pinguine	DEL	44	8	10	18	56	—	—	—	—	—
2008–09	Füchse Duisburg	DEL	28	2	9	11	28	—	—	—	—	—
2008–09	Frankfurt Lions	DEL	22	2	3	5	14	5	0	2	2	6
2009–10	Frankfurt Lions	DEL	50	0	8	8	12	4	0	0	0	0
2010–11	HC Uničov	CZE.3	6	0	1	1	8	—	—	—	—	—
2011–12	Löwen Frankfurt	DEU.3	12	0	0	0	6	—	—	—	—	—
1.GBun totals			126	20	37	57	158	7	0	0	0	2
DEL totals			733	68	176	244	835	52	6	7	13	57

=== International ===
Year	Team	Event	GP	G	A	Pts	PIM
1996	Germany	WCH	3	0	0	0	4
1997	Germany	OGQ	3	0	0	0	0
1997	Germany	WC	5	0	0	0	0
1998	Germany	OG	3	1	0	1	2
1999	Germany	WC B	7	2	1	3	4
2000	Germany	OGQ	3	0	1	1	4
2000	Germany	WC B	7	1	3	4	8
2001	Germany	OGQ	3	0	0	0	0
2002	Germany	OG	7	0	1	1	43
2003	Germany	WC	7	1	0	1	10
2004	Germany	WC	6	0	0	0	6
Senior totals			54	5	6	11	77

"Daniel Kunce". Elite Prospects.
