= Dale Derkatch =

Canadian ice hockey player

- Born: October 17, 1964 (age 61) Winnipeg, Manitoba, Canada
- Height: 5 ft 6 in (168 cm)
- Weight: 163 lb (74 kg; 11 st 9 lb)
- Position: Centre
- Shot: Left
- Played for: HC Bolzano; HC Asiago; Ilves; EC Hedos München; Sportbund DJK Rosenheim; Zürcher SC; Düsseldorfer EG; Maddogs München; Kaufbeurer Adler
- NHL draft: 140th overall, 1983; Edmonton Oilers
- Playing career: 1984–1998

Dale Derkatch (born October 17, 1964) is a Canadian former professional ice hockey centre. In 2024, he was appointed Assistant General Manager by the Regina Pats of the Western Hockey League (WHL).

== Playing career ==
Derkatch played junior hockey for the Regina Pats of the Western Hockey League, during which he was drafted by the Edmonton Oilers in the 1983 NHL entry draft, 140th overall in the 7th round. Derkatch never signed with the Oilers, however, and instead he spent his entire professional career in Europe. He began his professional career in 1984 in Serie A in Italy, playing for HC Bolzano winning the 1985 Italian Ice Hockey Championship, then HC Asiago before spending three seasons in Finland's SM-liiga for Ilves.

In 1989, Derkatch moved to the Eishockey-Bundesliga in Germany, playing for EC Hedos München for one season before signing with the Sportbund DJK Rosenheim. He then had a brief spell in the Nationalliga A in Switzerland for Zürcher SC in 1992 before returning to Germany to win the German Ice Hockey Championship with the Düsseldorfer EG. He rejoined Hedos München in 1993 for the win of another German Ice Hockey Championship in 1994 before the team changed its name to Maddogs München for the inaugural Deutsche Eishockey Liga season. The team would ultimately cease operations before the season finished, and Derkatch finished the year in the 2nd Bundesliga with SC Riessersee. After another season in DEL with Kaufbeurer Adler in 1995, Derkatch returned to SC Riessersee for two seasons before retiring in 1998.

== Post-playing career ==
After his retirement, Derkatch was hired by the Washington Capitals as a scout in 1998. In 2008, Derkatch became head coach of the Regina Pats, lasting just one season before becoming skills coach and director of hockey personnel with the Prince Albert Raiders. In 2015, Derkatch became an amateur scout for the Toronto Maple Leafs, taking the same position at the Columbus Blue Jackets in 2022, before being appointed Assistant General Manager by the Regina Pats in 2024.

== Career statistics ==
=== Regular season and playoffs ===
| | | | Regular season | | | | | Playoffs |
| Season | Team | League | GP | G | A | Pts | PIM | GP | G | A | Pts | PIM |
|---|---|---|---|---|---|---|---|---|---|---|---|---|
| 1980–81 | Notre Dame Hounds AAA | Midget |
| 1981–82 | Regina Pats | WHL | 71 | 62 | 80 | 142 | 92 | 19 | 11 | 23 | 34 | 38 |
| 1982–83 | Regina Pats | WHL | 67 | 84 | 95 | 179 | 62 | 5 | 5 | 4 | 9 | 13 |
| 1983–84 | Regina Pats | WHL | 62 | 72 | 87 | 159 | 92 | 23 | 12 | 41 | 53 | 54 |
| 1984–85 | HC Bolzano | ITA | 36 | 51 | 75 | 126 | 30 | — | — | — | — | — |
| 1984–85 | Regina Pats | WHL | 4 | 4 | 7 | 11 | 0 | 7 | 2 | 5 | 7 | 10 |
| 1985–86 | HC Asiago | ITA | 28 | 41 | 59 | 100 | 18 | — | — | — | — | — |
| 1985–86 | University of Manitoba | CWUAA | 2 | 3 | 2 | 5 | 2 | — | — | — | — | — |
| 1986–87 | Ilves | SM-l | 44 | 24 | 31 | 55 | 57 | — | — | — | — | — |
| 1987–88 | Ilves | SM-l | 41 | 28 | 24 | 52 | 24 | 4 | 1 | 1 | 2 | 6 |
| 1988–89 | Ilves | SM-l | 44 | 36 | 30 | 66 | 49 | 5 | 2 | 1 | 3 | 4 |
| 1989–90 | EC Hedos München | 1.GBun | 28 | 27 | 31 | 58 | 30 | 3 | 1 | 1 | 2 | 2 |
| 1990–91 | Sportbund DJK Rosenheim | 1.GBun | 44 | 40 | 51 | 91 | 38 | 11 | 8 | 15 | 23 | 10 |
| 1991–92 | Sportbund DJK Rosenheim | 1.GBun | 44 | 40 | 55 | 95 | 46 | 10 | 13 | 8 | 21 | 14 |
| 1992–93 | Zürcher SC | NDA | 13 | 4 | 6 | 10 | 2 | — | — | — | — | — |
| 1993–94 | EC Hedos München | 1.GBun | 44 | 19 | 26 | 45 | 43 | 6 | 4 | 5 | 9 | 4 |
| 1994–95 | Mad Dogs München | DEL | 26 | 14 | 17 | 31 | 47 | — | — | — | — | — |
| 1994–95 | SC Riessersee | DEU.2 | 17 | 21 | 27 | 48 | 22 | 9 | 15 | 13 | 28 | 28 |
| 1995–96 | Kaufbeurer Adler | DEL | 49 | 22 | 32 | 54 | 64 | 3 | 2 | 0 | 2 | 0 |
| 1996–97 | SC Riessersee | DEU.2 | 53 | 39 | 58 | 97 | 82 | — | — | — | — | — |
| 1997–98 | SC Riessersee | DEU.2 | 54 | 30 | 65 | 95 | 46 | — | — | — | — | — |
| SM-l totals | | | 129 | 88 | 85 | 173 | 130 | 9 | 3 | 2 | 5 | 10 |
| 1.GBun totals | | | 180 | 131 | 174 | 305 | 167 | 41 | 28 | 36 | 64 | 34 |
| DEU.2 totals | | | 124 | 90 | 150 | 240 | 150 | 9 | 15 | 13 | 28 | 28 |

=== International ===
| Year | Team | Event | GP | G | A | Pts | PIM |
|---|---|---|---|---|---|---|---|
| 1983 | Canada | WJC | 7 | 3 | 4 | 7 | 2 |
| 1984 | Canada | WJC | 7 | 5 | 0 | 5 | 4 |
| Junior totals | | | 14 | 8 | 4 | 12 | 6 |

== Awards ==
- Bob Brownridge Memorial Trophy (WHL leading scorer) - 1983
- WHL First All-Star Team – 1983
