= Darren Boyko =

Canadian ice hockey player

- Born: January 16, 1964 (age 62) Winnipeg, Manitoba, Canada
- Height: 5 ft 9 in (175 cm)
- Weight: 169 lb (77 kg; 12 st 1 lb)
- Position: Centre
- Shot: Right
- Played for: Winnipeg Jets; HIFK; Västra Frölunda HC; Berlin Capitals
- NHL draft: Undrafted
- Playing career: 1985–1997

Darren Boyko (born January 16, 1964) is a Canadian former professional ice hockey player. Boyko is best known for a long and successful career in HIFK (Finland). He also played one-game stint in the NHL and the Elitserien. He played one game in the NHL for the Winnipeg Jets in 1989 and one game in Elitserien for Västra Frölunda HC in 1997.

Boyko was born in Winnipeg, Manitoba. As a youth, he played in the 1977 Quebec International Pee-Wee Hockey Tournament with a minor ice hockey team from Saint Boniface, Winnipeg.

Boyko spent two highly productive years playing for the University of Toronto before turning pro. In his first year with U of T, with Mike Keenan as his coach, Boyko put up 33 goals and 84 points in just 40 games, then added another 17 points in just nine playoff games en route to a National Championship. The following year, he again scored 84 points for the Varsity Blues.

In '85-'86, he played four games for the Canadian National Team but spent the bulk of the year playing professionally in Finland. After three years with Helsinki, Boyko signed a deal with his hometown Winnipeg Jets.

Boyko had structured his deal to allow him to return to Finland if he didn't crack the Jets roster. While he made the team out of camp, he remained on the sidelines as a healthy scratch for over a month before finally drawing into a game versus the Boston Bruins. After his one-game audition, he returned to Finland and played seven more seasons with HIFK Helsinki.

In 2001, Boyko was inducted into the Manitoba Sports Hall of Fame. In 2006, he became the second non-Finnish player, after Carl Brewer, to be inducted into the Finnish Hockey Hall of Fame.

== Career statistics ==
=== Regular season and playoffs ===
			Regular season					Playoffs
Season	Team	League	GP	G	A	Pts	PIM	GP	G	A	Pts	PIM
1980–81	St. Boniface Saints	MJHL	48	48	68	116	42	—	—	—	—	—
1981–82	Winnipeg Warriors	WHL	65	35	37	72	14	—	—	—	—	—
1982–83	Winnipeg Warriors	WHL	72	49	81	130	8	3	0	2	2	0
1983–84	University of Toronto	CIAU	40	33	51	84	24	9	7	10	17	4
1984–85	University of Toronto	CIAU	39	31	53	84	42	2	1	0	1	6
1985–86	HIFK	SM-l	36	18	26	44	8	8	1	3	4	2
1985–86	Canadian National Team	Intl	4	1	1	2	0	—	—	—	—	—
1986–87	HIFK	SM-l	44	22	13	35	24	5	1	3	4	0
1987–88	HIFK	SM-l	44	14	40	54	16	6	1	3	4	4
1988–89	Winnipeg Jets	NHL	1	0	0	0	0	—	—	—	—	—
1988–89	Moncton Hawks	AHL	18	3	7	10	2	—	—	—	—	—
1988–89	HIFK	SM-l	34	15	15	30	10	2	0	0	0	0
1989–90	HIFK	SM-l	42	12	20	32	36	2	1	0	1	2
1990–91	HIFK	SM-l	42	16	23	39	20	3	0	3	3	4
1991–92	HIFK	SM-l	44	14	23	37	18	9	2	3	5	0
1992–93	HIFK	SM-l	47	15	16	31	6	4	0	0	0	0
1993–94	HIFK	SM-l	48	18	20	38	14	3	0	0	0	0
1994–95	HIFK	SM-l	48	15	20	35	24	3	0	0	0	0
1995–96	HIFK	SM-l	47	12	20	32	30	—	—	—	—	—
1996–97	Berlin Capitals	DEL	32	4	17	21	8	4	0	2	2	2
1996–97	Västra Frölunda	SWE	1	0	0	0	0	—	—	—	—	—
NHL totals			1	0	0	0	0	—	—	—	—	—
SM-l totals			476	171	236	407	206	45	6	15	21	12

== Awards and achievements ==
- MJHL First All-Star Team (1981)
- MJHL Scoring Champion (1981)
- Honoured Member of the Manitoba Hockey Hall of Fame
- Member #180 of the Finnish Hockey Hall of Fame

== See also ==
- List of players who played only one game in the NHL
