= Tobias Abstreiter =

German former ice hockey centre

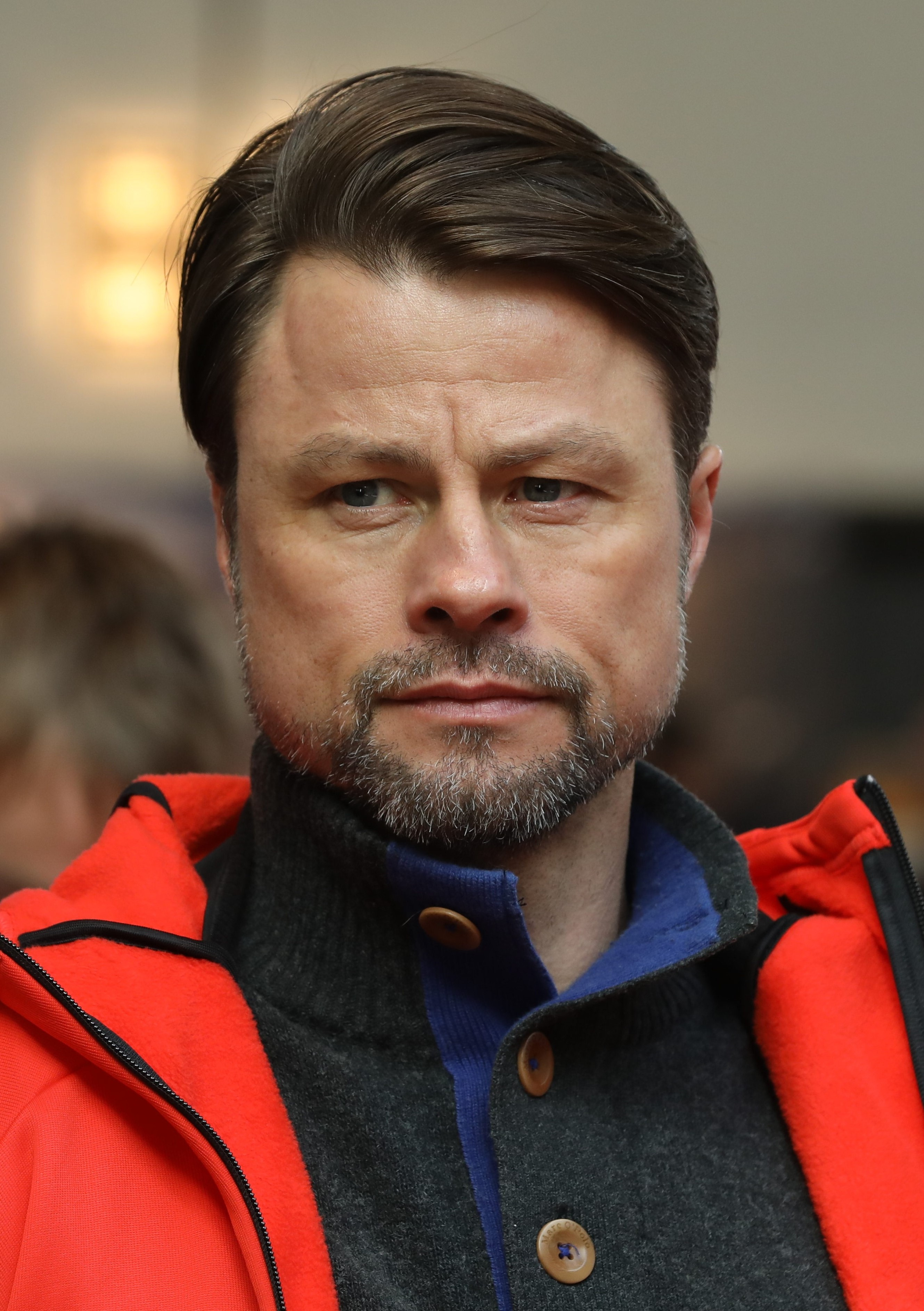
- Tobias Abstreiter (2018)
- Born: July 6, 1970 (age 55) Landshut, West Germany
- Height: 5 ft 9 in (175 cm)
- Weight: 185 lb (84 kg; 13 st 3 lb)
- Position: Centre
- Shot: Left
- Played for: EV Landshut; EC Hedos München; Kölner Haie; Maddogs München; Kassel Huskies; Straubing Tigers
- National team: Germany
- Playing career: 1987–2008

Tobias Abstreiter (born July 6, 1970) is a German former ice hockey centre. During his playing career he was described as a two-way player and a faceoff specialist.

== Professional career ==
He started his career in 1987–88 with EV Landshut, playing there for six seasons until moving to EC Hedos München in 1993-94 and, in mid-season, to the Kölner Haie in 1994–95, playing on two consecutive championship teams. In 1997, he moved to TSV Erding for one season before transferring to the Kassel Huskies where he would go on to captain the team. In 2006–07, he left the Huskies to sign a two-year contract with the Straubing Tigers, where his younger brother, Peter, also played.

== International career ==
Abstreiter has represented Germany on thirteen different occasions, both as a junior and as a professional. He has totalled five goals and seven assists in 26 games as a junior and four goals and 17 assists in 48 games as a professional. He last played professionally for Germany at the 2004 World Cup of Hockey, where he went scoreless in four games.
Abstreiter played for Germany in a total of six World Championships. Furthermore, he participated in the 2002 Winter Olympics, finishing eighth in the tournament. Abstreiter was also the head coach of team Germany at the 2021 World Juniors. He led Germany to the quarter-finals for the first time in history.

== Career statistics ==
=== Regular season and playoffs ===
			Regular season					Playoffs
Season	Team	League	GP	G	A	Pts	PIM	GP	G	A	Pts	PIM
1986–87	EV Landshut	1.GBun	14	0	0	0	0	—	—	—	—	—
1987–88	EV Landshut	1.GBun	18	0	0	0	0	—	—	—	—	—
1988–89	EV Landshut	1.GBun	19	3	3	6	6	3	0	0	0	0
1989–90	EV Landshut	1.GBun	36	6	11	17	16	—	—	—	—	—
1990–91	EV Landshut	1.GBun	42	11	20	31	30	5	2	2	4	2
1991–92	EV Landshut	1.GBun	43	9	17	26	74	9	5	3	8	6
1992–93	EV Landshut	1.GBun	44	9	26	35	37	6	0	2	2	10
1993–94	Hedos München	1.GBun	42	5	12	17	51	10	1	4	5	0
1994–95	Mad Dogs München	DEL	27	5	16	21	18	—	—	—	—	—
1994–95	Kölner Haie	DEL	15	4	3	7	4	18	2	9	11	22
1995–96	Kölner Haie	DEL	46	15	15	30	56	14	3	8	11	12
1996–97	Kölner Haie	DEL	49	10	12	22	36	4	0	0	0	4
1997–98	TSV Erding	DEU.2	56	27	38	65	81	—	—	—	—	—
1998–99	Kassel Huskies	DEL	43	7	12	19	90	—	—	—	—	—
1999–2000	Kassel Huskies	DEL	54	7	29	36	42	8	1	2	3	6
2000–01	Kassel Huskies	DEL	53	10	21	31	87	8	2	4	6	4
2001–02	Kassel Huskies	DEL	58	15	26	41	48	7	2	4	6	22
2002–03	Kassel Huskies	DEL	48	5	17	22	64	2	0	0	0	4
2003–04	Kassel Huskies	DEL	50	6	22	28	48	—	—	—	—	—
2004–05	Kassel Huskies	DEL	47	6	13	19	54	—	—	—	—	—
2005–06	Kassel Huskies	DEL	47	9	17	26	60	—	—	—	—	—
2006–07	Straubing Tigers	DEL	12	3	3	6	33	—	—	—	—	—
2007–08	Straubing Tigers	DEL	54	7	13	20	58	—	—	—	—	—
1.GBun totals			258	43	89	132	214	33	8	11	19	18
DEL totals			603	109	219	328	698	61	10	27	37	78

=== International ===
Year	Team	Event	GP	G	A	Pts	PIM
1987	West Germany	EJC	7	0	1	1	2
1988	West Germany	WJC	7	0	2	2	4
1988	West Germany	EJC	5	2	4	6	14
1989	West Germany	WJC	7	1	1	2	9
1994	Germany	WC	4	0	0	0	2
2000	Germany	OGQ	3	2	2	4	0
2000	Germany	WC B	7	1	6	7	10
2001	Germany	WC	7	0	2	2	6
2002	Germany	OG	7	0	2	2	0
2002	Germany	WC	3	0	2	2	2
2003	Germany	WC	7	1	1	2	2
2004	Germany	WC	6	0	2	2	6
2004	Germany	WCH	4	0	0	0	2
Junior totals			26	5	7	12	37
Senior totals			48	4	17	21	30
