= Brent Gilchrist =

Canadian ice hockey player (born 1967)

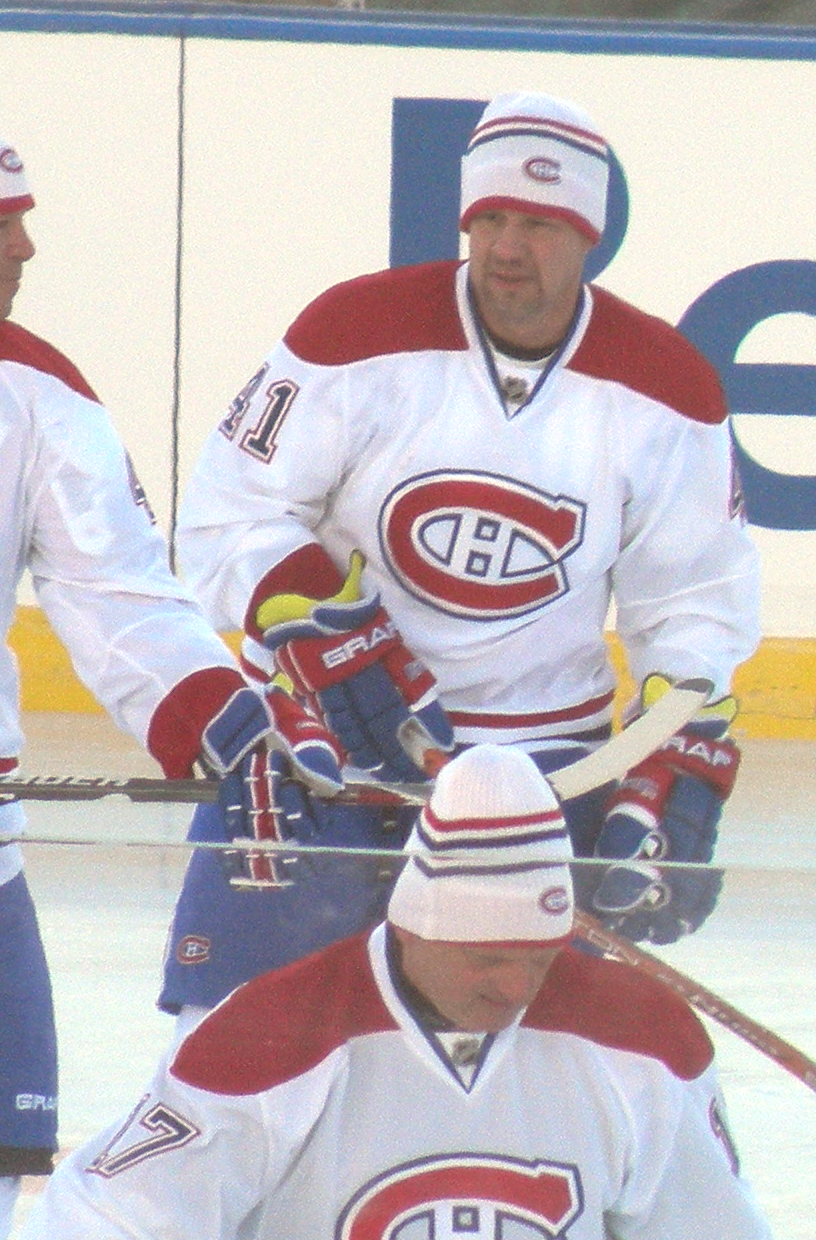
- Born: April 3, 1967 (age 59) Moose Jaw, Saskatchewan, Canada
- Height: 5 ft 11 in (180 cm)
- Weight: 181 lb (82 kg; 12 st 13 lb)
- Position: Left wing
- Shot: Left
- Played for: Montreal Canadiens; Edmonton Oilers; Minnesota North Stars; Dallas Stars; Detroit Red Wings; Nashville Predators
- NHL draft: 79th overall, 1985; Montreal Canadiens
- Playing career: 1987–2003

Brent Lindsay Gilchrist (born April 3, 1967) is a Canadian former professional hockey player who played 15 seasons in the National Hockey League (NHL) from 1988-2003. In his career, Gilchrist played 792 games, totaling 135 goals and 305 points. He appeared in 10 post-seasons in his NHL career, playing 90 games and totaling 17 goals, 14 assists and 31 points. He was a member of the Stanley Cup champion Detroit Red Wings in 1998.

== Early life ==
Gilchrist quickly took up hockey after his family moved west to Vernon, British Columbia. In Peewee, he and fellow future pro hockey player Jeff Finley won the BC provincial championships. After his 15-year-old season in Midget hockey, Gilchrist was asked to play in the playoffs for the Vernon Rockets of the BCJHL. The Rockets fell to the Penticton Knights and their star, Brett Hull, in seven games.

The next season, Gilchrist made his mark as a rookie in the WHL with the Kelowna Wings. In 1985, after a third losing season in a row, the team relocated to Spokane, Washington, and changed its name to the Chiefs. Gilchrist quickly became a star in the WHL and tallied 141 goals and 290 points in just 218 games played. Gilchrist was selected 79th overall by the Montreal Canadiens in the 1985 NHL entry draft.

== Professional career ==
=== Montreal ===
In 1987, Gilchrist turned pro with the Sherbrooke Canadiens. He led the team in scoring with 28 goals, 48 assists and 76 points. Gilchrist was called up from the American Hockey League (AHL) to the NHL. In his rookie season with Montreal, Gilchrist, wearing jersey number 41, put up 24 points in 49 games and helped a powerful Canadiens team to the Stanley Cup Final against the Calgary Flames, only to lose in six games.

=== Edmonton ===
After 4 years and 236 games with Montreal, Gilchrist, Shayne Corson, and Vladimir Vujtek were traded to the Edmonton Oilers for Vincent Damphousse and a 4th round pick in 1993.

=== Minnesota/Dallas ===
Before completing a full season in Edmonton, Gilchrist was traded to the Minnesota North Stars for forward Todd Elik on March 5, 1993. That summer, after missing the playoffs, the North Stars relocated to Dallas, Texas and became the Dallas Stars. Led by young star Mike Modano, Dallas built a powerful team. The Stars made the playoffs three out of the four years Gilchrist played with the team. In the summer of 1997, after a seven-game loss to Edmonton in the first round of the playoffs, Gilchrist became an unrestricted free agent and signed a new contract with the defending Stanley Cup champion Detroit Red Wings.

=== Detroit ===
Coached by legend Scotty Bowman and captained by Hall of Famer Steve Yzerman, the Red Wings placed third in the Western Conference, finishing only six points behind Gilchrist's former club, the Dallas Stars. After defeating the Phoenix Coyotes in a hard-fought six game series, the Wings next faced the St. Louis Blues. After again taking six games to finish the series, the Wings were set to face the Stars in the Western Conference final. The grueling series was taken by the Wings in six. The Wings moved on to face the upstart Washington Capitals in the Stanley Cup Final. The experienced Red Wings proved to be too much to handle for the Capitals as Detroit swept the series in four games and won back-to-back Stanley Cup championships. Gilchrist's move to Detroit in 1997 paid dividends as he finally won the Stanley Cup after almost 10 years in the NHL. The price of winning the cup was high for Gilchrist, however, as he underwent a serious hernia operation and played only 29 games in the two following years.

=== Return to Dallas ===
After playing just 19 games in the 2001-2002 season with the Red Wings, Gilchrist was placed on waivers and claimed by the Dallas Stars on Wednesday, February 6th, 2002. Gilchrist played 26 games with Dallas, registering 2 goals, 5 assists, and 6 penalty minutes. The team failed to make the playoffs that season.

=== Nashville ===
In the 2002 off-season, Gilchrist decided to sign a one-year deal with the Nashville Predators. He played in 41 games in 2002-2003 with Nashville and hung up the skates for good after missing the playoffs.

== Personal life ==
After Gilchrist retired from the NHL, he relocated to Kelowna, British Columbia, with his wife Caroline and two sons, Mathieu and Jack. In December 2009, Gilchrist was invited to the Montreal Canadiens Centennial Game, which featured many famous and loved former players from the long history of the team. He was also invited to play for the Canadiens in the 2011 Heritage Classic Alumni game against the Flames, which featured many players from the 1989 Stanley Cup Final.

== Career statistics ==
			Regular season					Playoffs
Season	Team	League	GP	G	A	Pts	PIM	GP	G	A	Pts	PIM
1983–84	Kelowna Wings	WHL	69	16	11	27	16	—	—	—	—	—
1984–85	Kelowna Wings	WHL	51	35	38	73	58	6	5	2	7	8
1985–86	Spokane Chiefs	WHL	52	45	45	90	57	9	6	7	13	19
1986–87	Spokane Chiefs	WHL	46	45	55	100	71	5	2	7	9	6
1986–87	Sherbrooke Canadiens	AHL	—	—	—	—	—	10	2	7	9	2
1987–88	Sherbrooke Canadiens	AHL	77	26	48	74	83	6	1	3	4	6
1988–89	Montreal Canadiens	NHL	49	8	16	24	16	9	1	1	2	10
1988–89	Sherbrooke Canadiens	AHL	7	6	5	11	7	—	—	—	—	—
1989–90	Montreal Canadiens	NHL	57	9	15	24	28	8	2	0	2	2
1990–91	Montreal Canadiens	NHL	51	6	9	15	10	13	5	3	8	6
1991–92	Montreal Canadiens	NHL	79	23	27	50	57	11	2	4	6	6
1992–93	Edmonton Oilers	NHL	60	10	10	20	47	—	—	—	—	—
1992–93	Minnesota North Stars	NHL	8	0	1	1	2	—	—	—	—	—
1993–94	Dallas Stars	NHL	76	17	14	31	31	9	3	1	4	2
1994–95	Dallas Stars	NHL	32	9	4	13	16	5	0	1	1	2
1995–96	Dallas Stars	NHL	77	20	22	42	36	—	—	—	—	—
1996–97	Dallas Stars	NHL	67	10	20	30	24	6	2	2	4	2
1997–98	Detroit Red Wings	NHL	61	13	14	27	40	15	2	1	3	12
1998–99	Detroit Red Wings	NHL	5	1	0	1	0	3	0	0	0	0
1999–00	Detroit Red Wings	NHL	24	4	2	6	24	6	0	0	0	6
2000–01	Detroit Red Wings	NHL	60	1	8	9	41	5	0	1	1	0
2001–02	Detroit Red Wings	NHL	19	1	1	2	8	—	—	—	—	—
2001–02	Dallas Stars	NHL	26	2	5	7	6	—	—	—	—	—
2002–03	Nashville Predators	NHL	41	1	2	3	14	—	—	—	—	—
NHL totals			792	135	170	305	400	90	17	14	31	48
