= Mick Vukota =

Canadian ice hockey player

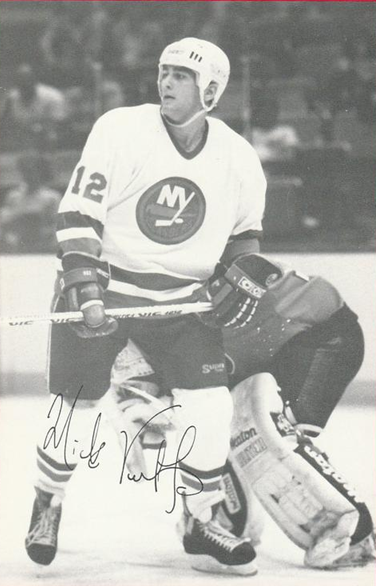
- Vukota in 1989 card
- Born: September 14, 1966 (age 60) Saskatoon, Saskatchewan, Canada
- Height: 6 ft 2 in (188 cm)
- Weight: 215 lb (98 kg; 15 st 5 lb)
- Position: Right wing
- Shot: Right
- Played for: New York Islanders; Tampa Bay Lightning; Montreal Canadiens
- NHL draft: Undrafted
- Playing career: 1987–2000

Marinko "Mick" Vukota (born September 14, 1966) is a Canadian former professional ice hockey right wing. He is perhaps best known for playing 10 seasons with the New York Islanders of the National Hockey League (NHL), where he played the role of an enforcer.

== Playing career ==
Undrafted, Vukota signed with the New York Islanders, who were looking to add toughness to their roster, on March 2, 1987. Vukota worked his way up through their system and found himself skating on NHL ice by the end of the 1987–88 season, and scoring his first goal. He also registered 82 penalty minutes in 17 games. Over the next decade, Vukota forged a reputation as a tough scrapper and punishing forechecker who could occasionally score a goal. He was suspended several times by the league for on-ice incidents, and this added to his growing reputation. He went on to become the Islanders' career penalty minutes leader with 1,879, but his one-dimensional style resulted in a demotion to the Utah Grizzlies of the IHL in 1996–97. He split the 1997–98 season between the Tampa Bay Lightning and Montreal Canadiens in what was his last year in the NHL, surpassing 2,000 career penalty minutes, and then played two more seasons with the Grizzlies in the IHL before retiring.

Despite not being a major goal scorer, with only 17 career goals across 575 NHL matches, he did score a hat trick against the Washington Capitals, in a 5–3 Islanders win at the Capital Centre, on October 20, 1989.

== Career statistics ==
=== Regular season and playoffs ===
			Regular season					Playoffs
Season	Team	League	GP	G	A	Pts	PIM	GP	G	A	Pts	PIM
1983–84	Winnipeg Warriors	WHL	3	1	1	2	10	—	—	—	—	—
1984–85	Kelowna Wings	WHL	66	10	6	16	247	6	0	0	0	56
1985–86	Spokane Chiefs	WHL	64	19	14	33	369	9	6	4	10	68
1986–87	Spokane Chiefs	WHL	61	25	28	53	337	4	0	0	0	40
1987–88	Springfield Indians	AHL	52	7	9	16	372	—	—	—	—	—
1987–88	New York Islanders	NHL	17	1	0	1	82	2	0	0	0	23
1988–89	Springfield Indians	AHL	3	1	0	1	33	—	—	—	—	—
1988–89	New York Islanders	NHL	48	2	2	4	237	—	—	—	—	—
1989–90	New York Islanders	NHL	76	4	8	12	290	1	0	0	0	17
1990–91	Capital District Islanders	AHL	2	0	0	0	9	—	—	—	—	—
1990–91	New York Islanders	NHL	60	2	4	6	238	—	—	—	—	—
1991–92	New York Islanders	NHL	74	0	6	6	293	—	—	—	—	—
1992–93	New York Islanders	NHL	74	2	5	7	216	15	0	0	0	16
1993–94	New York Islanders	NHL	72	3	1	4	237	4	0	0	0	17
1994–95	New York Islanders	NHL	39	0	2	2	109	—	—	—	—	—
1995–96	New York Islanders	NHL	32	1	1	2	106	—	—	—	—	—
1996–97	Utah Grizzlies	IHL	43	11	11	22	185	7	1	2	3	20
1996–97	New York Islanders	NHL	17	1	0	1	71	—	—	—	—	—
1997–98	Tampa Bay Lightning	NHL	42	1	0	1	116	—	—	—	—	—
1997–98	Montreal Canadiens	NHL	22	0	0	0	76	1	0	0	0	0
1998–99	Utah Grizzlies	IHL	48	8	7	15	226	—	—	—	—	—
1999–00	Utah Grizzlies	IHL	71	6	15	21	249	4	0	0	0	2
2011–12	Cape Cod Bluefins	FHL	1	0	0	0	4	—	—	—	—	—
NHL totals			573	17	29	46	2,071	23	0	0	0	73

== See also ==
- List of NHL players with 2000 career penalty minutes
