= Scotty Munro Memorial Trophy =

Annual ice hockey award in North America

- Named in honour of Scotty Munro
- Sport: Ice hockey
- League: Western Hockey League
- Awarded for: Regular season title

History
- First award: 1966–67
- First winner: Edmonton Oil Kings
- Most wins: Kamloops Blazers (7)
- Most recent: Everett Silvertips (3)

The Scotty Munro Memorial Trophy is awarded annually to the regular season champion of the Western Hockey League. It is named after one of the league's founders, Scotty Munro. Munro served as the general manager of the Estevan Bruins, one of the league's founding franchises, and later as the head coach and general manager of the Calgary Centennials.

== History ==
The WHL began play in 1966 as the Canadian Major Junior Hockey League, before it was renamed the Western Canada Junior Hockey League and, by 1979, the Western Hockey League. The first team to win the regular season title was the Edmonton Oil Kings, although it was the Flin Flon Bombers that established an early run of success, winning the Scott Munro Trophy three straight seasons from 1967–68 to 1969–70. This feat has been repeated only twice, with the Brandon Wheat Kings winning three straight from 1976–77 to 1978–79—Brandon's 125 points in the 1978–79 season are a league record—and the Kamloops Blazers from 1989–90 to 1991–92. The Blazers' run was part of a remarkable twelve-year period in which the team won its record seven regular season titles. The most recent repeat-winner is the Winnipeg Ice, who won the title in 2021–22 and 2022–23.

Twenty five of the fifty seven winners have gone on to win the Ed Chynoweth Cup as the league's playoff champion in the same season, while nine winners have gone on to win the Memorial Cup as Canadian junior champions.

== List of winners ==
=== By year ===
Indicates that winner also won the league Championship

Indicates that winner also won the Memorial Cup

Indicates that winner also won both the league Championship and the Memorial Cup

Season	Team	Finish
1966–67	Edmonton Oil Kings	78 points
1967–68	Flin Flon Bombers	99 points
1968–69	Flin Flon Bombers	94 points
1969–70	Flin Flon Bombers	84 points
1970–71	Edmonton Oil Kings	91 points
1971–72	Calgary Centennials	101 points
1972–73	Saskatoon Blades	103 points
1973–74	Regina Pats	97 points
1974–75	Victoria Cougars	99 points
1975–76	New Westminster Bruins	112 points
1976–77	Brandon Wheat Kings	116 points
1977–78	Brandon Wheat Kings	106 points
1978–79	Brandon Wheat Kings	125 points
1979–80	Portland Winter Hawks	107 points
1980–81	Victoria Cougars	121 points
1981–82	Lethbridge Broncos	100 points
1982–83	Saskatoon Blades	105 points
1983–84	Kamloops Junior Oilers	100 points
1984–85	Prince Albert Raiders	119 points
1985–86	Medicine Hat Tigers	109 points
1986–87	Kamloops Blazers	113 points
1987–88	Saskatoon Blades	97 points
1988–89	Swift Current Broncos	111 points
1989–90	Kamloops Blazers	112 points
1990–91	Kamloops Blazers	102 points
1991–92	Kamloops Blazers	106 points
1992–93	Swift Current Broncos	100 points
1993–94	Kamloops Blazers	106 points
1994–95	Kamloops Blazers	110 points
1995–96	Brandon Wheat Kings	105 points
1996–97	Lethbridge Hurricanes	97 points
1997–98	Portland Winter Hawks	111 points
1998–99	Calgary Hitmen	110 points
1999–2000	Calgary Hitmen	120 points
2000–01	Red Deer Rebels	114 points
2001–02	Red Deer Rebels	100 points
2002–03	Kelowna Rockets	109 points
2003–04	Kelowna Rockets	98 points
2004–05	Kootenay Ice	104 points
2005–06	Medicine Hat Tigers	103 points
2006–07	Everett Silvertips	111 points
2007–08	Tri-City Americans	108 points
2008–09	Calgary Hitmen	122 points
2009–10	Calgary Hitmen	107 points
2010–11	Saskatoon Blades	115 points
2011–12	Edmonton Oil Kings	107 points
2012–13	Portland Winterhawks	117 points
2013–14	Kelowna Rockets	118 points
2014–15	Brandon Wheat Kings	114 points
2015–16	Victoria Royals	106 points
2016–17	Regina Pats	112 points
2017–18	Moose Jaw Warriors	109 points
2018–19	Prince Albert Raiders	112 points
2019–20	Portland Winterhawks	97 points
2020–21	Not awarded due to the COVID-19 pandemic	
2021–22	Winnipeg Ice	111 points
2022–23	Winnipeg Ice	115 points
2023–24	Saskatoon Blades	105 points
2024–25	Everett Silvertips	104 points
2025–26	Everett Silvertips	117 points

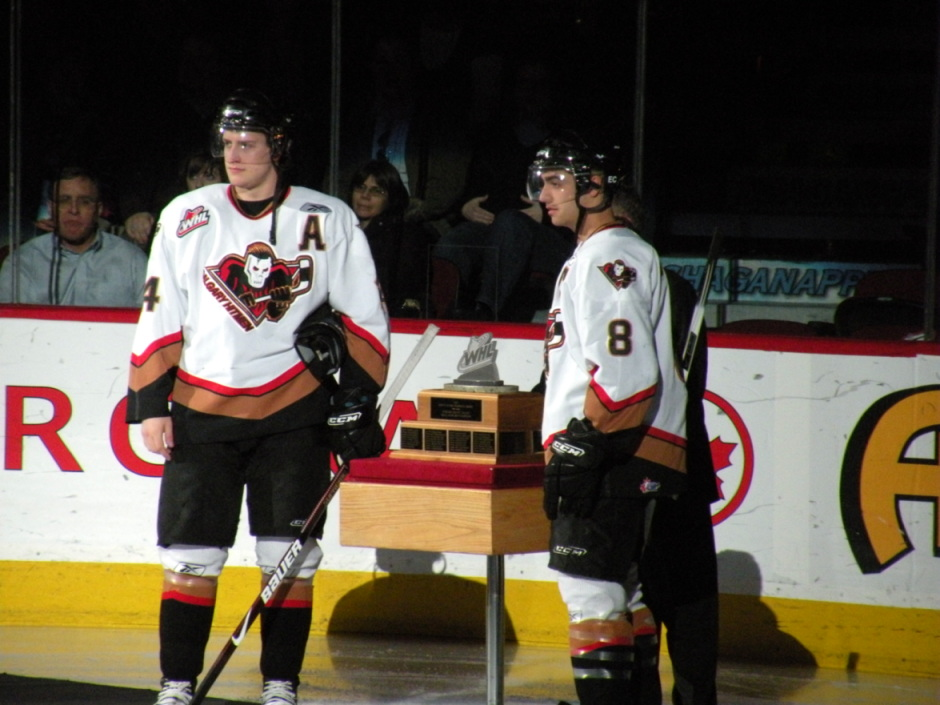
The Calgary Hitmen won their third of four titles in 2008–09.

=== By team ===
Team	Titles won	Years won
Kamloops Blazers	7	1983–84, 1986–87, 1989–90, 1990–91, 1991–92, 1993–94, 1994–95
Saskatoon Blades	5	1972–73, 1982–83, 1987–88, 2010–11, 2023–24
Brandon Wheat Kings	5	1976–77, 1977–78, 1978–79, 1995–96, 2014–15
Portland Winterhawks	4	1979–80, 1997–98, 2012–13, 2019–20
Calgary Hitmen	4	1998–99, 1999–00, 2008–09, 2009–10
Edmonton Oil Kings^{[a]}	3	1966–67, 1970–71, 2011–12
Flin Flon Bombers	3	1967–68, 1968–69, 1969–70
Kelowna Rockets	3	2002–03, 2003–04, 2013–14
Everett Silvertips	3	2006–07, 2024–25, 2025-26
Regina Pats	2	1973–74, 2016–17
Victoria Cougars	2	1974–75, 1980–81
Prince Albert Raiders	2	1984–85, 2018–19
Medicine Hat Tigers	2	1985–86, 2005–06
Swift Current Broncos	2	1988–89, 1992–93
Red Deer Rebels	2	2000–01, 2001–02
Winnipeg Ice	2	2021–22, 2022–23
Calgary Centennials	1	1971–72
New Westminster Bruins	1	1975–76
Lethbridge Broncos	1	1981–82
Lethbridge Hurricanes	1	1996–97
Kootenay Ice	1	2004–05
Tri-City Americans	1	2007–08
Victoria Royals	1	2015–16
Moose Jaw Warriors	1	2017–18

=== Notes ===
- ^{a} The original Oil Kings moved to Portland in 1976; the team was revived via expansion in 2007.

== See also ==
- Hamilton Spectator Trophy (Ontario Hockey League)
- Jean Rougeau Trophy (Quebec Maritimes Junior Hockey League)
- List of Canadian Hockey League awards
