= Winnipeg Warriors =

- City: Winnipeg, Manitoba
- League: Western Hockey League
- Operated: 1980–84
- Home arena: Winnipeg Arena
- Colours: Black, Red, & White

Franchise history
- 1980–1984: Winnipeg Warriors
- 1984–present: Moose Jaw Warriors

The Winnipeg Warriors were a junior ice hockey team that played in the Western Hockey League. They were founded as an expansion team in 1980, but suffered from attendance problems competing with the Winnipeg Jets of the National Hockey League and ultimately moved to Moose Jaw, Saskatchewan in 1984, becoming the Moose Jaw Warriors. During their time in Winnipeg, the team played at Winnipeg Arena. Winnipeg's struggles at the gate were matched by the Warriors' futility on the ice, as the franchise qualified for the playoffs only once in their four years in Winnipeg: a three-game sweep at the hands of the Lethbridge Broncos in 1983. The Warriors 1983–84 record of 9–63–0 is the second-worst 72 game mark in league history. Only the Victoria Cougars' record of 5–65–2 in 1989–90 was worse.

== Season-by-season record ==
Note: GP = Games played, W = Wins, L = Losses, T = Ties, Pts = Points, GF = Goals for, GA = Goals against

Season	GP	W	L	T	Pts	GF	GA	Finish	Playoffs
1980–81	72	28	43	1	57	298	345	7th East	Out of playoffs
1981–82	72	23	48	1	47	285	388	8th East	Out of playoffs
1982–83	72	42	30	0	84	347	321	4th East	Lost in preliminary round
1983–84	72	9	63	0	18	239	580	8th East	Out of playoffs
Totals	288	102	184	2	206	1,169	1,634		

== NHL alumni ==
- Darren Boyko
- Randy Gilhen
- Mike Keane
- Mick Vukota
- Richard Zemlak

== See also ==
- List of ice hockey teams in Manitoba
