= List of WHL seasons =

This is a list of Western Hockey League seasons since inception of the league in 1966. The league was founded as the Canadian Major Junior Hockey League, before being renamed the Western Canada Junior Hockey League in 1967, the Western Canada Hockey League in 1968, and the Western Hockey League in 1978.

== Canadian Major Junior Hockey League (CMJHL) ==
1966–67

== Western Canada Hockey League (WCHL) ==
1967–68 | 1968–69 | 1969–70 | 1970–71 | 1971–72 | 1972–73 | 1973–74 | 1974–75 | 1975–76 | 1976–77

1977–78

== Western Hockey League (WHL) ==
1978–79 | 1979–80 | 1980–81 | 1981–82 | 1982–83 | 1983–84 | 1984–85 | 1985–86 | 1986–87 | 1987–88

1988–89 | 1989–90 | 1990–91 | 1991–92 | 1992–93 | 1993–94 | 1994–95 | 1995–96 | 1996–97 | 1997–98

1998–99 | 1999–00 | 2000–01 | 2001–02 | 2002–03 | 2003–04 | 2004–05 | 2005–06 | 2006–07 | 2007–08

2008–09 | 2009–10 | 2010–11 | 2011–12 | 2012–13 | 2013–14 | 2014–15 | 2015–16 | 2016–17 | 2017–18

2018–19 | 2019–20 | 2020–21 | 2021–22 | 2022–23 | 2023–24 | 2024–25 | 2025–26 | 2026–27

== See also ==
- Western Hockey League
- List of OHL seasons
- List of QMJHL seasons
- NHL entry draft
