= 1979–80 WHL season =

Junior ice hockey season

- League: Western Hockey League
- Sport: Ice hockey
- Teams: 11

Regular season
- Scotty Munro Memorial Trophy: Portland Winter Hawks (1)
- Season MVP: Doug Wickenheiser (Regina Pats)
- Top scorer: Doug Wickenheiser (Regina Pats)

Playoffs
- Finals champions: Regina Pats (2)
- Runners-up: Victoria Cougars

WHL seasons
- 1978–79 1980–81

1979–80 CHL season
- League: Canadian Hockey League
- Sport: Ice hockey
- Teams: 33

OMJHL

QMJHL

WHL

Memorial Cup
- Finals champions: Cornwall Royals (QMJHL) (2nd title)
- Runners-up: Peterborough Petes (OMJHL)

The 1979–80 WHL season was the 14th season of the Western Hockey League (WHL). It featured eleven teams completing a 72-game regular season. The Portland Winter Hawks became the first American-based club to top the regular season standings, capturing the Scotty Munro Memorial Trophy. In the playoffs, the Regina Pats won their second President's Cup, defeating the Victoria Cougars in the championship final.

The season was the first for the Great Falls Americans, after the Edmonton Oil Kings relocated to Great Falls prior to the season. However, the team lasted only 28 games before ceasing operations on December 16, 1979, for the remainder of the season. Thus while twelve teams opened the season, only eleven played it through to completion.

== League notes ==
- The WHL changed its divisional format, opting for a two division format of eight teams in the East and four in the West over the previous three division format.

== Team changes ==
- The Edmonton Oil Kings relocated to Great Falls, Montana, becoming the Great Falls Americans.

== Regular season ==
=== Final standings ===
East Division
Pos	Team	Pld	W	L	T	GF	GA	Pts
1	x – Regina Pats	72	47	24	1	429	311	95
2	x – Calgary Wranglers	72	43	27	2	376	319	88
3	x – Medicine Hat Tigers	72	37	30	5	344	315	79
4	x – Billings Bighorns	72	37	34	1	326	284	75
5	x – Brandon Wheat Kings	72	33	37	2	319	343	68
6	x – Lethbridge Broncos	72	28	39	5	329	349	61
7	Saskatoon Blades	72	27	40	5	331	382	59
8	Great Falls Americans (Note: Folded mid-season)	28	2	25	1	73	186	5

x – qualified for playoffs
Notes:

West Division
Pos	Team	Pld	W	L	T	GF	GA	Pts
1	x – Portland Winter Hawks	72	53	18	1	398	293	107
2	x – Victoria Cougars	72	51	21	0	349	226	102
3	x – Seattle Breakers	72	29	41	2	297	364	60
4	New Westminster Bruins	72	10	61	1	244	443	21

x – qualified for playoffs

=== Scoring leaders ===
Note: GP = Games played; G = Goals; A = Assists; Pts = Points; PIM = Penalties in minutes

Player	Team	GP	G	A	Pts	PIM
Doug Wickenheiser	Regina Pats	71	89	81	170	99
Tim Tookey	Portland Winter Hawks	70	58	83	141	55
Barry Pederson	Victoria Cougars	72	52	88	140	50
Kelly Kisio	Calgary Wranglers	71	65	73	138	64
Jim Dobson	Portland Winter Hawks	72	66	68	134	179
Ron Flockhart	Regina Pats	65	54	76	130	63
Gord Williams	Lethbridge Broncos	72	57	65	122	92
Darren Veitch	Regina Pats	71	29	93	122	118
Brian Varga	Regina Pats	70	39	79	118	97
Doug Morrison	Lethbridge Broncos	68	58	59	117	188

== 1980 WHL Playoffs ==
=== First round ===
- Regina defeated Lethbridge 4 games to 0
- Brandon defeated Calgary 4 games to 3
- Medicine Hat defeated Billings 4 games to 3

=== Division semi-finals ===
Round Robin format

- Medicine Hat (3–1) advanced
- Regina (2–2) advanced
- Brandon (1–3) eliminated
- Victoria (5–3) advanced
- Seattle (4–4) advanced
- Portland (3–5) eliminated

=== Division finals ===
- Regina defeated Medicine Hat 4 games to 1
- Victoria defeated Seattle 4 games to 0

=== WHL Championship ===
- Regina defeated Victoria 4 games to 1

== WHL awards ==
Most Valuable Player: Doug Wickenheiser, Regina Pats
Top Scorer - Bob Clarke Trophy: Doug Wickenheiser, Regina Pats
Most Sportsmanlike Player: Steve Tsujiura, Medicine Hat Tigers
Top Defenseman - Bill Hunter Trophy: Dave Babych, Portland Winter Hawks
Rookie of the Year - Jim Piggott Memorial Trophy: Grant Fuhr, Victoria Cougars
Top Goaltender - Del Wilson Trophy: Kevin Eastman, Victoria Cougars
Coach of the Year - Dunc McCallum Memorial Trophy: Doug Sauter, Calgary Wranglers
Regular season Champions - Scotty Munro Memorial Trophy: Portland Winter Hawks

== All-Star teams ==
	First Team		Second team	
Goal	Grant Fuhr	Victoria Cougars	Andy Moog	Billings Bighorns
Defense	Dave Babych	Portland Winter Hawks	Jim McTaggart	Billings Bighorns
Defense	Darren Veitch	Regina Pats	Mark Robinson	Victoria Cougars
Center	Doug Wickenheiser	Regina Pats	Barry Pederson	Victoria Cougars
Left wing	Greg C. Adams (tied)	Victoria Cougars	Ken Solheim	Medicine Hat Tigers
Left wing	Florent Robidoux (tied)	Portland Winter Hawks	-	-
Right wing	Jim Dobson	Portland Winter Hawks	Mike Blaisdell (tie)	Regina Pats
Right wing	-	-	Don Gillen (tie)	Brandon Wheat Kings

== See also ==
- 1980 Memorial Cup
- 1980 NHL entry draft
- 1979 in sports
- 1980 in sports

Preceded by 1978–79 WHL season	WHL seasons	Succeeded by 1980–81 WHL season
