= Spokane Flyers (junior) =

- City: Spokane, Washington
- League: Western Hockey League
- Operated: 1980–82
- Home arena: Spokane Coliseum

Franchise history
- 1967–78: Flin Flon Bombers
- 1978–79: Edmonton Oil Kings
- 1979–80: Great Falls Americans
- 1980–82: Spokane Flyers

The Spokane Flyers were a junior ice hockey team that played one and a half seasons in the Western Hockey League from 1980–1982. They played in Spokane, Washington, United States.

== History ==
This team is not to be confused with the Spokane Flyers that played in Canadian Senior Amateur Hockey and won the Allan Cup championships in 1976 and 1980.

The Spokane Flyers entered the WHL on May 15, 1980 when Bob Cooper, owner of the dormant Great Falls Americans franchise, resurrected his team and relocated it to Spokane for the 1980–81 WHL season. Like the Americans, the Flyers would quickly cease operations, as the franchise folded on December 2, 1981 just 26 games into its second season.

It was widely believed that the failure of the Flyers was due to poor management. Spokane would have a second chance in the WHL when the relocated Kelowna Wings renamed themselves the Spokane Chiefs.

The Flyers franchise first joined the then-named Western Canada Hockey League (WCHL) in 1967 as the Flin Flon Bombers. The franchise had a great deal of stability in Flin Flon, Manitoba and lasted eleven seasons in the community before the WHL outgrew it. The Bombers relocated to Edmonton, Alberta for one season in 1978 before being sold and relocating again to Great Falls, Montana. The Great Falls Americans failed to last even one season, as they ceased operations in December, having played 28 of a scheduled 72 games of the 1979–80 WHL season. Cooper resurrected them again in Spokane for the start of the 1980–81 season, though they would fold again in December of the following 1981–82 WHL season.

The Flyers were posthumously involved in one of the most bizarre trades in hockey history. After ceasing operations, the Flyers team bus was sold to the Victoria Cougars. The Cougars owners were not willing to pay the duties and taxes required to bring the vehicle into Canada, so on December 19, 1983, the Cougars traded the bus to the Seattle Breakers for holdout Tom Martin.

== Season-by-season Record ==
Note: GP = Games played, W = Wins, L = Losses, T = Ties Pts = Points, GF = Goals for, GA = Goals against

Season	GP	W	L	T	GF	GA	Points	Finish	Playoffs
1980–81	72	17	54	1	288	488	35	4th West	Lost West semi-final
1981–82	26	3	22	1	102	196	7	5th West	Folded

== See also ==
- Great Falls Americans
- Spokane Chiefs
- Spokane Jets
