= 1982–83 WHL season =

Junior ice hockey season

- League: Western Hockey League
- Sport: Ice hockey
- Teams: 14

Regular season
- Scotty Munro Memorial Trophy: Saskatoon Blades (2)
- Season MVP: Mike Vernon (Calgary Wranglers)
- Top scorer: Dale Derkatch (Regina Pats)

Playoffs
- Finals champions: Lethbridge Broncos (1)
- Runners-up: Portland Winter Hawks

WHL seasons
- 1981–82 1983–84

1982–83 CHL season
- League: Canadian Hockey League
- Sport: Ice hockey
- Teams: 40

OHL

QMJHL

WHL

Memorial Cup
- Finals champions: Portland Winter Hawks (WHL) (1st title)
- Runners-up: Oshawa Generals (OHL)

The 1982–83 WHL season was the 17th season of the Western Hockey League (WHL). Fourteen teams completed a 72-game season. The Saskatoon Blades topped the regular season standings to capture their second Scotty Munro Memorial Trophy. In the playoffs, the Lethbridge Broncos won the President's Cup, defeating the Portland Winter Hawks in the championship series. The Broncos thus earned a berth in the 1983 Memorial Cup tournament. This was the first Memorial Cup to feature a host team as a fourth participant, and that host was the host Winter Hawks. Portland won the tournament, becoming the first American team to win the Memorial Cup title.

The season was the first for the Nanaimo Islanders, after the Billings Bighorns relocated to Vancouver Island prior to the season. In addition, two expansion teams joined the WHL: the Prince Albert Raiders and the Kelowna Wings.

== Team changes ==
- The Billings Bighorns are relocated to Nanaimo, British Columbia, becoming the Nanaimo Islanders.
- The Kelowna Wings join the WHL as an expansion team.
- The Prince Albert Raiders join the WHL as an expansion team.

== Regular season ==
=== Final standings ===
East Division
Pos	Team	Pld	W	L	T	GF	GA	Pts
1	x – Saskatoon Blades	72	52	19	1	467	303	105
2	x – Regina Pats	72	48	24	0	397	281	96
3	x – Calgary Wranglers	72	44	26	2	353	258	90
4	x – Winnipeg Warriors	72	42	30	0	347	321	84
5	x – Lethbridge Broncos	72	38	31	3	284	271	79
6	x – Medicine Hat Tigers	72	37	34	1	345	338	75
7	Brandon Wheat Kings	72	21	51	0	327	460	42
8	Prince Albert Raiders	72	16	55	1	312	455	33

x – qualified for playoffs

West Division
Pos	Team	Pld	W	L	T	GF	GA	Pts
1	x – Portland Winter Hawks	72	50	22	0	495	387	100
2	x – Victoria Cougars	72	47	24	1	444	335	95
3	x – Kamloops Junior Oilers	72	46	26	0	461	356	92
4	x – Seattle Breakers	72	24	47	1	319	418	49
5	Nanaimo Islanders	72	20	51	1	357	487	41
6	Kelowna Wings	72	12	57	3	299	531	27

x – qualified for playoffs

=== Scoring leaders ===
Note: GP = Games played; G = Goals; A = Assists; Pts = Points; PIM = Penalties in minutes

Player	Team	GP	G	A	Pts	PIM
Dale Derkatch	Regina Pats	67	84	95	179	62
Dean Evason	Kamloops Junior Oilers	70	71	93	164	102
Kelly Glowa	Brandon Wheat Kings	68	71	92	163	87
Roger Kortko	Saskatoon Blades	72	62	99	161	79
Ken Yaremchuk	Portland Winter Hawks	66	51	109	160	76
Randy Heath	Portland Winter Hawks	72	82	69	151	52
Jim McGeough	Nanaimo Islanders	72	76	56	132	126
Mark Morrison	Victoria Cougars	58	55	75	130	54
Dan Hodgson	Prince Albert Raiders	72	56	74	130	66
Darren Boyko	Winnipeg Warriors	72	49	81	130	8

== 1983 WHL Playoffs ==
=== First round ===
- Saskatoon earned a bye
- Regina earned a bye
- Calgary defeated Medicine Hat 3 games to 2
- Lethbridge defeated Winnipeg 3 games to 0

=== Division semi-finals ===
- Calgary defeated Regina 4 games to 1
- Lethbridge defeated Saskatoon 4 games to 2
- Portland defeated Seattle 4 games to 0
- Victoria defeated Kamloops 4 games to 3

=== Division finals ===
- Lethbridge defeated Calgary 4 games to 2
- Portland defeated Victoria 4 games to 1

=== WHL Championship ===
- Lethbridge defeated Portland 4 games to 1

== WHL awards ==
Most Valuable Player: Mike Vernon, Calgary Wranglers
Top Scorer - Bob Clarke Trophy: Dale Derkatch, Regina Pats
Most Sportsmanlike Player: Darren Boyko, Winnipeg Warriors
Top Defenseman - Bill Hunter Trophy: Gary Leeman, Regina Pats
Rookie of the Year - Jim Piggott Memorial Trophy: Dan Hodgson, Prince Albert Raiders
Top Goaltender - Del Wilson Trophy: Mike Vernon, Calgary Wranglers
Coach of the Year - Dunc McCallum Memorial Trophy: Daryl Lubiniecki, Saskatoon Blades
Regular season champions - Scotty Munro Memorial Trophy: Saskatoon Blades

== All-Star teams ==
	First Team		Second Team	
Goal	Mike Vernon	Calgary Wranglers	Todd Lumbard	Regina Pats
Defense	Gary Leeman	Regina Pats	Doug Bodger	Kamloops Junior Oilers
Defense	Mike Heidt	Calgary Wranglers	Bob Rouse	Lethbridge Broncos
Center	Dale Derkatch	Regina Pats	Ken Yaremchuk	Portland Winter Hawks
Left Wing	Randy Heath	Portland Winter Hawks	Todd Strueby	Saskatoon Blades
Right Wing	Rich Chernomaz	Victoria Cougars	Lane Lambert	Saskatoon Blades

== See also ==
- 1983 NHL entry draft
- 1982 in sports
- 1983 in sports

Preceded by 1981–82 WHL season	WHL seasons	Succeeded by 1983–84 WHL season
