= Nanaimo Islanders =

- City: Nanaimo, British Columbia
- League: Western Hockey League
- Operated: 1982–1983
- Home arena: Frank Crane Arena

Franchise history
- 1966–67: Calgary Buffaloes
- 1967–77: Calgary Centennials
- 1977–82: Billings Bighorns
- 1982–83: Nanaimo Islanders
- 1983–88: New Westminster Bruins
- 1988-Present: Tri-City Americans

The Nanaimo Islanders were a junior ice hockey team based in Nanaimo, British Columbia that played one season in the Western Hockey League in 1982–83. They played at Frank Crane Arena. The team relocated to New Westminster, British Columbia before settling in Kennewick, Washington as the Tri-City Americans. The franchise was an original WCHL team, forming in 1966 as the Calgary Buffaloes, later the Centennials. It moved to Nanaimo in 1982 after spending five years as the Billings Bighorns.

== Season-by-season record ==
Note: GP = Games played, W = Wins, L = Losses, T = Ties Pts = Points, GF = Goals for, GA = Goals against

Season	GP	W	L	T	GF	GA	Points	Finish	Playoffs
1982–83	78	20	51	1	357	487	41	5th West	Out of playoffs

== NHL alumni ==
- Mark Lamb
- Jim McGeough
- Pokey Reddick
- Bob Rouse
- Vern Smith
- Rocky Trottier
- Alfie Turcotte
- Richard Zemlak

== See also ==
- List of ice hockey teams in British Columbia
