= Calgary Wranglers (WHL) =

Canadian ice hockey team (1977–1987)

- City: Calgary, Alberta
- League: Western Hockey League
- Operated: 1977–87
- Home arena: Stampede Corral
- Colours: Red & White

Franchise history
- 1967–73: Winnipeg Jets
- 1973–76: Winnipeg Clubs
- 1976–77: Winnipeg Monarchs
- 1977–87: Calgary Wranglers
- 1987–Present: Lethbridge Hurricanes

The Calgary Wranglers were a junior ice hockey team that played in the Western Hockey League from 1977 until 1987. The Wranglers played their home games in Calgary, Alberta, Canada, at the Stampede Corral.

== History ==
The previous Calgary WHL (at that time called the Western Canada Hockey League, or WCHL) franchise, the Calgary Centennials, had moved south to become the Billings Bighorns shortly after the end of the 1976–77 WCHL season. A new investor group bought the existing Winnipeg Monarchs franchise and relocated them to Calgary before the start of the 1977–78 WCHL season. They would last 10 years in Calgary before relocating again to Lethbridge, Alberta, becoming the Hurricanes. After 35 years, the Wranglers name was revived when the Calgary Flames re-located their American Hockey League affiliate to the Scotiabank Saddledome and re-named them after the old team.

== Season-by-season record ==
Note: GP = Games played, W = Wins, L = Losses, T = Ties Pts = Points, GF = Goals for, GA = Goals against

Season	GP	W	L	T	GF	GA	Points	Finish	Playoffs
1977–78	72	18	40	14	303	404	50	4th Central	Out of playoffs
1978–79	72	28	38	6	349	392	62	3rd Central	Lost Central division final
1979–80	72	43	27	2	376	319	88	2nd East	Lost in first round
1980–81	72	46	24	2	368	295	94	2nd East	Lost WHL final
1981–82	72	41	29	2	334	266	84	4th East	Lost East division semi-final
1982–83	72	44	26	2	353	258	90	3rd East	Lost East division final
1983–84	72	36	36	0	353	345	72	6th East	Lost in first round
1984–85	72	39	31	2	382	351	80	4th East	Lost East division semi-final
1985–86	72	23	47	2	288	378	48	8th East	Out of playoffs
1986–87	72	23	46	3	304	390	49	7th East	Out of playoffs

== NHL alumni ==
- Darrell Anholt
- Murray Brumwell
- Len Barrie
- Dan Bourbonnais
- Colin Chisholm
- Ray Cote
- Mark Greig
- Mike Heidt
- Doug Houda
- Trent Kaese
- Darin Kimble
- Kelly Kisio
- Ross McKay
- Dana Murzyn
- Jim Playfair
- Ken Quinney
- Warren Skorodenski
- Randy Smith
- Mark Tinordi
- Brian Tutt
- Mike Vernon
- Leigh Verstraete
- Bob Wilkie
- Carey Wilson
- Mike Zanier

== See also ==
- List of ice hockey teams in Alberta
- Ice hockey in Calgary
