= Kelowna Wings =

- City: Kelowna, British Columbia
- League: Western Hockey League
- Operated: 1982–85
- Home arena: Kelowna Memorial Arena

Franchise history
- 1982–85: Kelowna Wings
- 1985–present: Spokane Chiefs

The Kelowna Wings were a junior ice hockey team based in Kelowna, British Columbia that played in the Western Hockey League from 1982 to 1985. The Wings were abysmal in their three-year tenure, winning just 56 out of 216 games played. The franchise relocated to Spokane, Washington following the 1984–85 season and became the Spokane Chiefs.

The City of Kelowna would wait ten years for the WHL to return as the Tacoma Rockets relocated to the city and became a perennial contender.

== Season-by-season Record ==
Note: GP = Games played, W = Wins, L = Losses, T = Ties Pts = Points, GF = Goals for, GA = Goals against

Season	GP	W	L	T	GF	GA	Points	Finish	Playoffs
1982–83	72	12	57	3	299	531	27	6th West	Out of playoffs
1983–84	72	15	56	1	295	448	31	6th West	Out of playoffs
1984–85	72	29	39	4	359	367	62	3rd West	Lost semi-final

== NHL Alumni ==
- Rocky Dundas
- Wade Flaherty
- Brent Gilchrist
- Ian Herbers
- Tony Horacek
- Jeff Rohlicek
- Jeff Sharples
- Mick Vukota
- Darcy Wakaluk

== See also ==
- List of ice hockey teams in British Columbia
- Kelowna Rockets
