= Maddogs München =

Defunct ice hockey team in Germany

Maddogs Munchen
- City: Munich, Germany
- League: Deutsche Eishockey Liga
- Founded: 1994

Franchise history
- 1970-1982: EHC 70 München
- 1982-1994: EC Hedos München
- 1994-1995: Maddogs München

The Maddogs München was an ice hockey team in Munich, Germany. The club played in the Deutsche Eishockey Liga for the 1994–95 season before folding.

== History ==
The EHC 70 München was a hockey club, which was founded 1970 and operational until 1982. The club took over the ice hockey department of Münchner EV in 1976. The senior team played the 1980–81 season in the Eishockey-Bundesliga but was relegated in February 1982 to the second division.

A new club, EC Hedos München, was founded at 1982 and started to participate in competitions in 1983–84 jointly with the SC München. After the 1983–84 season, the club took over the youth teams of SC München whereas the senior team of the club continued playing as USC München. The senior team of EC Hedos was promoted in 1989 to the Eishockey-Bundesliga. The club won the German championship in 1994.

In summer 1994, EC Hedos München attempted to outsource its senior team as Maddogs München. In 1994–95, the Maddogs München started playing in the Deutsche Eishockey Liga. On December 18, 1994, it played its last DEL game against EHC 80 Nuremberg. and collapsed. The club had played in 27 games (17 wins, 1 tie and 9 losses) at the time it folded. The results of the games it had played in were removed from the league table.

== 1994–95 roster ==
Goaltenders

- 27 Karl Friesen (12)
- 30 Christian Frütel (1)

Defencemen

- 2 Alexander Genze (2)
- 3 Gregor (Greg) Müller (3)
- 4 Mike Schmidt (2)
- 6 Zdenek Travnicek
- 7 Christian Lukes (4)
- 15 Daniel Kunce (13)
- 18 Sergei Shendelev (RUS) (5)
- 21 Rainer Lutz (6)

Forwards

- 8 Gordon Sherven (5)
- 10 Anthony (Toni) Vogel (7)
- 12 Michal Hreus (4)
- 16 Dale Derkatch (CAN) (6)
- 19 Christian Brittig (8)
- 20 Harry Waibel (9)
- 22 Ewald Steiger (11)
- 23 Dieter Hegen
- 24 Ralf Reisinger (10)
- 26 Henrik Hölscher (11)
- 37 Tobias Abstreiter (2)
- 46 Christoph Sandner (6)
- 69 Harald Birk (8)
- 91 Chris Straube (4)

Coach:

- Bob Murdoch
