= Great Falls Americans (WHL) =

- City: Great Falls, Montana
- League: Western Hockey League
- Operated: 1979–80
- Home arena: Four Seasons Arena

Franchise history
- 1967–78: Flin Flon Bombers
- 1978–79: Edmonton Oil Kings
- 1979–80: Great Falls Americans
- 1980–82: Spokane Flyers

The Great Falls Americans were a junior ice hockey team in the Western Hockey League who played a portion of the 1979–80 WHL season. The team was a relocation of the 1978–79 Edmonton Oil Kings franchise, which had previously been the then-named Western Canada Hockey League's (WCHL) Flin Flon Bombers, from the 1967–68 through 1977–78 WCHL seasons. The Americans played at the Four Seasons Arena in Great Falls, Montana. The team only lasted 28 games of the WHL's 72-game season, winning only two games. After the WHL completed its season, the dormant Americans franchise relocated as the Spokane Flyers.

== Season-by-season record ==
Season statistics
Note: GP = Games played, W = Wins, L = Losses, T = Ties Pts = Points,
GF = Goals for, GA = Goals against

| Season | GP | W | L | T | GF | GA | Points | Finish | Playoffs |
| 1979–80 | 28 | 2 | 25 | 1 | 73 | 186 | 5 | 8th East | Folded |

== NHL alumni ==
List of alumni who also played in the National Hockey League.

- Dave Barr
- Ken Daneyko
