= Billings Bighorns =

Junior ice hockey team

- City: Billings, Montana
- League: Western Hockey League
- Operated: 1977–1982
- Home arena: MetraPark Arena
- Colors: Red, white, and blue

Franchise history
- 1966–1967: Calgary Buffaloes
- 1967–1977: Calgary Centennials
- 1977–1982: Billings Bighorns
- 1982–1983: Nanaimo Islanders
- 1983–1988: New Westminster Bruins
- 1988–present: Tri-City Americans

The Billings Bighorns were a junior ice hockey team in the Western Hockey League who played from 1977 to 1982. The team was originally the Calgary Centennials. They played at the MetraPark Arena in Billings, Montana. The team wore uniforms based upon those then used by the Washington Capitals. They moved to Nanaimo after the 1981–82 season.

== NHL alumni ==
- Dave Barr
- Murray Brumwell
- Rod Buskas
- Lindsay Carson
- Pat Conacher
- Ray Cote
- Mike Eagles
- Brian Ford
- Bruce Holloway
- Glenn Johannesen
- Gord Kluzak
- Mark Lamb
- Jim McGeough
- Jim McTaggart
- Randy Moller
- Andy Moog
- Don Nachbaur
- Harvie Pocza
- Pokey Reddick
- Bob Rouse
- Mike Toal
- Rocky Trottier
- Leigh Verstraete
- Mike Zanier

== Season-by-season record ==
Note: GP = Games played, W = Wins, L = Losses, T = Ties Pts = Points, GF = Goals for, GA = Goals against

Season	GP	W	L	T	GF	GA	Points	Finish	Playoffs
1977–78	72	32	31	9	342	336	73	2nd Central	Lost final
1978–79	72	38	23	11	378	302	87	1st Central	Eliminated in round-robin
1979–80	72	37	34	1	326	284	75	4th East	Lost in first round
1980–81	72	30	40	2	334	334	62	5th East	Lost East Division quarter-final
1981–82	72	27	44	1	369	432	55	6th East	Lost East Division quarter-final
