= Lethbridge Broncos =

Ice hockey team

- City: Lethbridge, Alberta
- League: Western Hockey League
- Operated: 1974–1986
- Home arena: Lethbridge Sportsplex

Franchise history
- 1967–74: Swift Current Broncos
- 1974–86: Lethbridge Broncos
- 1986–present: Swift Current Broncos

The Lethbridge Broncos were a junior ice hockey team in the Western Hockey League from 1974 until 1986. They played at the Lethbridge Sportsplex.

Division titles won: 1977–78, 1981–82
Regular season titles won: 1981–82
WHL Championships won: 1982–83
Memorial Cup Titles: None

== History ==
The Broncos started out as the Swift Current Broncos in Swift Current, Saskatchewan, but moved to Lethbridge in 1974. The team had been losing money in Swift Current and the new Lethbridge Sportsplex was beckoning for a team. The Broncos played in Lethbridge for twelve seasons, winning the President's Cup in 1982–83. In the mid 1980s, the team came up for sale, and despite a large and loyal fanbase, the Broncos were bought by interests in Swift Current and moved back to their original home. Lethbridge was without WHL hockey for only one season however, as the Calgary Wranglers moved to the city, becoming the Lethbridge Hurricanes in 1987.

== Season-by-season record ==
Note: GP = Games played, W = Wins, L = Losses, T = Ties Pts = Points, GF = Goals for, GA = Goals against

Season	GP	W	L	T	GF	GA	Points	Finish	Playoffs
1974–75	70	28	32	10	302	315	66	2nd East	Lost quarter-final
1975–76	72	28	35	9	293	352	65	3rd East	Lost quarter-final
1976–77	72	28	32	12	324	335	68	3rd Central	Lost semi-final
1977–78	72	36	29	7	341	328	79	1st Central	Eliminated in preliminary round robin
1978–79	72	37	28	7	389	326	81	2nd Central	Lost semi-final
1979–80	72	28	39	5	329	349	61	6th East	Lost in first round
1980–81	72	37	33	2	339	332	76	4th East	Lost East Division semi-final
1981–82	72	50	22	0	421	280	100	1st East	Lost East Division final
1982–83	72	38	31	3	284	271	79	5th East	Won Championship
1983–84	72	44	28	0	271	256	88	4th East	Lost in first round
1984–85	72	30	40	2	295	322	62	5th East	Lost in first round
1985–86	72	27	42	3	314	379	57	5th East	Eliminated in East Division round robin

== NHL alumni ==
- Warren Babe
- Dave Barr
- Mike Berger
- Rollie Boutin
- Ron Delorme
- Gerald Diduck
- Archie Henderson
- Ian Herbers
- Matt Hervey
- Earl Ingarfield, Jr.
- Trent Kaese
- Troy Loney
- Marc Magnan
- Ryan McGill
- Mike Moller
- Randy Moller
- Jay More
- Doug Morrison
- Troy Murray
- Steve Nemeth
- Bill Oleschuk
- Darcy Regier
- Bob Rouse
- Lindy Ruff
- Rocky Saganiuk
- Joe Sakic
- Darin Sceviour
- Vern Smith
- Brent Sutter
- Brian Sutter
- Darryl Sutter
- Duane Sutter
- Rich Sutter
- Ron Sutter
- Steve Tambellini
- Alex Tidey
- Mark Tinordi
- Bryan Trottier
- Gord Williams
- Ken Wregget

== Head coaches ==
- Mike Shabaga 1970–71
- Stan Dunn: 1970–71 to 1973–74
- Earl Ingarfield 1974–75 to 1975–76
- Mike Sauter 1976–77
- Howie Yanosik 1977–78
- Pat Ginnell 1978–79
- Mike Sauter 1979–80
- John Chapman 1980–81 to 1985–86
- Graham James 1985–86

== See also ==
- List of ice hockey teams in Alberta
