= 1993–94 ice hockey Bundesliga season =

German ice hockey season

The 1993–94 Ice hockey Bundesliga season was the 36th and final season of the Eishockey-Bundesliga, the top level of ice hockey in Germany. It was replaced by the Deutsche Eishockey Liga (DEL) for the 1994-95 season. 12 teams participated in the league, and EC Hedos Munchen won the championship.

== First round ==
	Club	GP	W	T	L	GF–GA	Pts
1.	Düsseldorfer EG (M)	44	33	2	9	182: 92	68:20
2.	EC Hedos München	44	30	3	11	189:108	63:25
3.	Krefelder EV	44	23	10	11	167:121	56:32
4.	EV Landshut	44	26	4	14	142:113	56:32
5.	Kölner EC	44	26	3	15	147:109	55:33
6.	BSC Preussen	44	23	5	16	168:128	51:37
7.	Mannheimer ERC	44	19	5	20	156:140	43:45
8.	ESV Kaufbeuren	44	14	3	27	120:169	31:57
9.	SB Rosenheim (N)	44	12	5	27	108:163	29:59
10.	Schwenninger ERC	44	11	7	26	115:175	29:59
11.	EHC Dynamo Berlin	44	11	2	31	119:214	24:64
12.	EC Ratingen	44	9	5	30	126:207	23:65

== Play-downs ==
=== First round ===
			Series	1	2	3	4	5	6	7
SB Rosenheim	–	EC Ratingen	4:2	4:1	6:2	6:3	1:7	2:5	5:1	–
Schwenninger ERC	–	EHC Dynamo Berlin	0:4	1:2	3:4 OT	3:4	2:6	–	–	–

=== Second round ===
			Series	1	2	3	4	5	6	7
Schwenninger ERC	–	EC Ratingen	4:3	5:6 SO	3:6	4:2	2:4	10:4	4:1	5:4

== Relegation ==
			Series	1	2	3
Schwenninger ERC	–	EC Kassel	2:0	6:1	4:1	–

== Playoffs ==
=== Quarterfinals ===
			Series	1	2	3	4	5	6	7
Düsseldorfer EG	–	ESV Kaufbeuren	4:0	3:0	3:1	4:1	3:2	–	–	–
EC Hedos München	–	Mannheimer ERC	4:0	7:1	5:1	8:6	8:3	–	–	–
Krefelder EV	–	BSC Preussen	2:4	3:5	4:3	4:5	2:3	4:3 SO	2:4	–
EV Landshut	–	Kölner EC	3:4	3:1	0:2	5:2	4:3 OT	2:3	2:4	2:4

=== Semifinals ===
			Serie	1	2	3	4	5
Düsseldorfer EG	–	BSC Preussen	3:2	2:1	2:5	0:3	5:2	6:2
EC Hedos München	–	Kölner EC	3:0	5:3	5:4	4:2	–	–

=== Final ===
			Series	1	2	3	4	5
Düsseldorfer EG	–	Hedos München	0:3	2:4	2:3	1:4	–	–
