= 1980–81 WHL season =

Junior ice hockey season

- League: Western Hockey League
- Sport: Ice hockey
- Teams: 13

Regular season
- Scotty Munro Memorial Trophy: Victoria Cougars (2)
- Season MVP: Steve Tsujiura (Medicine Hat Tigers)
- Top scorer: Brian Varga (Regina Pats)

Playoffs
- Finals champions: Victoria Cougars (1)
- Runners-up: Calgary Wranglers

WHL seasons
- 1979–80 1981–82

1980–81 CHL season
- League: Canadian Hockey League
- Sport: Ice hockey
- Teams: 35

OHL

QMJHL

WHL

Memorial Cup
- Finals champions: Cornwall Royals (QMJHL) (3rd title)
- Runners-up: Kitchener Rangers (OHL)

The 1980–81 WHL season was the 15th season of the Western Hockey League (WHL), featuring thirteen teams and a 72-game regular season. The Victoria Cougars won both the Scotty Munro Memorial Trophy for topping the regular season standings—setting a league record with 60 wins—and the President's Cup as league champions, defeating the Calgary Wranglers in the playoff finals.

The season was the first for both the Spokane Flyers, who reactivated the dormant Great Falls Americans franchise, and the expansion Winnipeg Warriors.

== Team changes ==
- The Great Falls Americans are reactivated and relocated to Spokane, Washington, becoming the Spokane Flyers.
- The Winnipeg Warriors join the WHL as an expansion team.

== Regular season ==
=== Final standings ===
East Division
Pos	Team	Pld	W	L	T	GF	GA	Pts
1	x – Regina Pats	72	49	21	2	423	315	100
2	x – Calgary Wranglers	72	46	24	2	368	295	94
3	x – Medicine Hat Tigers	72	40	29	3	358	302	83
4	x – Lethbridge Broncos	72	37	33	2	339	332	76
5	x – Billings Bighorns	72	30	40	2	336	334	62
6	x – Brandon Wheat Kings	72	29	40	3	342	352	61
7	Winnipeg Warriors	72	28	43	1	298	345	57
8	Saskatoon Blades	72	22	47	3	297	427	47

x – qualified for playoffs

West Division
Pos	Team	Pld	W	L	T	GF	GA	Pts
1	x – Victoria Cougars	72	60	11	1	462	217	121
2	x – Portland Winter Hawks	72	56	15	1	443	266	113
3	x – Seattle Breakers	72	26	46	0	318	393	52
4	x – Spokane Flyers	72	17	54	1	288	488	35
5	New Westminster Bruins	72	17	54	1	306	512	35

x – qualified for playoffs

=== Scoring leaders ===
Note: GP = Games played; G = Goals; A = Assists; Pts = Points; PIM = Penalties in minutes

Player	Team	GP	G	A	Pts	PIM
Brian Varga	Regina Pats	68	64	96	160	187
Jock Callander	Regina Pats	72	67	86	153	37
Barry Pederson	Victoria Cougars	55	65	82	147	65
Steve Tsujiura	Medicine Hat Tigers	72	55	84	139	60
Jim Benning	Portland Winter Hawks	72	28	111	139	61
Gary Yaremchuk	Portland Winter Hawks	72	56	79	135	121
Dave Michayluk	Regina Pats	72	62	71	133	39
Dave Chartier	Brandon Wheat Kings	69	64	60	124	295
Mark Sochatsky	Spokane Flyers	70	40	79	119	279
Brian Shaw	Portland Winter Hawks	72	53	65	118	176

== 1981 WHL Playoffs ==
=== First round ===
- Regina defeated Brandon 4 games to 1
- Calgary defeated Billings 4 games to 1
- Lethbridge defeated Medicine Hat 4 games to 1
- Spokane defeated New Westminster in 4th place tiebreaker game

=== Division semi-finals ===
- Regina earned a bye
- Calgary defeated Lethbridge 3 games to 1
- Victoria defeated Spokane 4 games to 0
- Portland defeated Seattle 4 games to 1

=== Division finals ===
- Calgary defeated Regina 4 games to 2
- Victoria defeated Portland 4 games to 0

=== WHL Championship ===
- Victoria defeated Calgary 4 games to 3

== All-Star game ==
On January 20, the WHL All-Stars defeated the Victoria Cougars 8–3 at Victoria, British Columbia before a crowd of 3,520.

== WHL awards ==
Most Valuable Player: Steve Tsujiura, Medicine Hat Tigers
Top Scorer - Bob Clarke Trophy: Brian Varga, Regina Pats
Most Sportsmanlike Player: Steve Tsujiura, Medicine Hat Tigers
Top Defenseman - Bill Hunter Trophy: Jim Benning, Portland Winter Hawks
Rookie of the Year - Jim Piggott Memorial Trophy: Dave Michayluk, Regina Pats
Top Goaltender - Del Wilson Trophy: Grant Fuhr, Victoria Cougars
Coach of the Year - Dunc McCallum Memorial Trophy: Ken Hodge, Portland Winter Hawks
Regular season Champions - Scotty Munro Memorial Trophy: Victoria Cougars

== All-Star teams ==
	First Team		Second Team	
Goal	Grant Fuhr	Victoria Cougars	Kelly Hrudey	Medicine Hat Tigers
Defense	Jim Benning	Portland Winter Hawks	Len Dawes	Victoria Cougars
Defense	Garth Butcher	Regina Pats	Gary Nylund	Portland Winter Hawks
Center	Barry Pederson	Victoria Cougars	Steve Tsujiura	Medicine Hat Tigers
Left Wing	Ken Solheim	Medicine Hat Tigers	Torrie Robertson	Victoria Cougars
Right Wing	Mike Moller	Lethbridge Broncos	Dave Michayluk	Regina Pats

== See also ==
- 1981 Memorial Cup
- 1981 NHL entry draft
- 1980 in sports
- 1981 in sports

Preceded by 1979–80 WHL season	WHL seasons	Succeeded by 1981–82 WHL season
