= 1981–82 WHL season =

Junior ice hockey season

- League: Western Hockey League
- Sport: Ice hockey
- Teams: 12

Regular season
- Scotty Munro Memorial Trophy: Lethbridge Broncos (1)
- Season MVP: Mike Vernon (Calgary Wranglers)
- Top scorer: Jock Callander (Regina Pats)

Playoffs
- Finals champions: Portland Winter Hawks (1)
- Runners-up: Regina Pats

WHL seasons
- 1980–81 1982–83

1981–82 CHL season
- League: Canadian Hockey League
- Sport: Ice hockey
- Teams: 35

OHL

QMJHL

WHL

Memorial Cup
- Finals champions: Kitchener Rangers (OHL) (1st title)
- Runners-up: Sherbrooke Castors (QMJHL)

The 1981–82 WHL season was the 16th season of the Western Hockey League (WHL), featuring twelve teams completing a 72-game regular season. The Lethbridge Broncos won the Scotty Munro Memorial Trophy for posting the best record during the regular season. In the playoffs, the Portland Winter Hawks became the first American-based club to win the President's Cup championship when they defeated the Regina Pats in the championship series. This also made the Winter Hawks the first American team to compete for the Memorial Cup at the 1982 tournament.

The season was the first for the Kamloops Junior Oilers, after the New Westminster Bruins relocated to Kamloops prior to the season. The season also marked the end of the Spokane Flyers organization, as it ceased operations on December 2, 1981, after playing only 26 games. As such, although the season began with thirteen teams, only twelve completed the season.

== Team changes ==
- The New Westminster Bruins are relocated to Kamloops, British Columbia, becoming the Kamloops Junior Oilers.

== Regular season ==
=== Final standings ===
East Division
Pos	Team	Pld	W	L	T	GF	GA	Pts
1	x – Lethbridge Broncos	72	50	22	0	421	280	100
2	x – Regina Pats	72	48	24	0	465	368	96
3	x – Saskatoon Blades	72	44	26	2	450	343	90
4	x – Calgary Wranglers	72	41	29	2	334	266	84
5	x – Brandon Wheat Kings	72	34	38	0	372	413	68
6	x – Billings Bighorns	72	27	44	1	369	432	55
7	Medicine Hat Tigers	72	25	46	1	308	446	51
8	Winnipeg Warriors	72	23	48	1	285	388	47

x – qualified for playoffs

West Division
Pos	Team	Pld	W	L	T	GF	GA	Pts
1	x – Portland Winter Hawks	72	46	24	2	380	323	94
2	x – Victoria Cougars	72	43	28	1	398	314	87
3	x – Seattle Breakers	72	36	34	2	339	310	74
4	x – Kamloops Junior Oilers	72	18	53	1	320	464	37
5	Spokane Flyers (Note: Folded mid-season)	26	3	22	1	102	196	7

x – qualified for playoffs

=== Scoring leaders ===
Note: GP = Games played; G = Goals; A = Assists; Pts = Points; PIM = Penalties in minutes

Player	Team	GP	G	A	Pts	PIM
Jock Callander	Regina Pats	71	79	111	190	59
Dave Michayluk	Regina Pats	72	62	111	173	128
Bruce Eakin	Saskatoon Blades	66	42	125	167	120
Jim McGeough	Billings Bighorns	71	93	66	159	142
Ken Yaremchuk	Portland Winter Hawks	72	58	99	157	181
Marc Habscheid	Saskatoon Blades	55	64	87	151	74
Dale Derkatch	Regina Pats	71	62	80	142	92
Kelly Glowa	Brandon Wheat Kings	72	59	78	137	87
Brian Shaw	Portland Winter Hawks	69	56	76	132	193
Wally Schreiber	Regina Pats	68	56	68	124	68
Mike Moller	Lethbridge Broncos	49	41	81	122	38

== 1982 WHL Playoffs ==
=== First round ===
- Lethbridge defeated Billings 4 games to 1
- Regina defeated Brandon 4 games to 0
- Calgary defeated Saskatoon 4 games to 1

=== Division semi-finals ===
- Lethbridge earned a bye
- Regina defeated Calgary 3 games to 1
- Portland defeated Kamloops 4 games to 0
- Seattle defeated Victoria 4 games to 0

=== Division finals ===
- Regina defeated Lethbridge 4 games to 3
- Portland defeated Seattle 4 games to 2

=== WHL Championship ===
- Portland defeated Regina 4 games to 1

== All-Star game ==
On January 19, the West All-Stars defeated the East All-Stars 4–2 at Winnipeg, Manitoba, before a crowd of 3,500.

== WHL awards ==
Most Valuable Player: Mike Vernon, Calgary Wranglers
Top Scorer - Bob Clarke Trophy: Jock Callander, Regina Pats
Most Sportsmanlike Player: Mike Moller, Lethbridge Broncos
Top Defenseman - Bill Hunter Trophy: Gary Nylund, Portland Winter Hawks
Rookie of the Year - Jim Piggott Memorial Trophy: Dale Derkatch, Regina Pats
Top Goaltender - Del Wilson Trophy: Mike Vernon, Calgary Wranglers
Coach of the Year - Dunc McCallum Memorial Trophy: Jack Sangster, Seattle Breakers
Regular season champions - Scotty Munro Memorial Trophy: Lethbridge Broncos

== All-Star teams ==
	First Team		Second Team	
Goal	Mike Vernon	Calgary Wranglers	Dave Ross	Seattle Breakers
Defense	Gary Nylund	Portland Winter Hawks	Gord Kluzak	Billings Bighorns
Defense	Garth Butcher	Regina Pats	Randy Moller	Lethbridge Broncos
Center	Bruce Eakin (tied)	Saskatoon Blades	Marc Habscheid	Saskatoon Blades
Center	Ken Yaremchuk (tied)	Portland Winter Hawks	-	-
Left Wing	Todd Strueby	Saskatoon Blades	Paul Cyr	Victoria Cougars
Right Wing	Mike Moller	Lethbridge Broncos	Dave Michayluk	Regina Pats

== See also ==
- 1982 NHL entry draft
- 1981 in sports
- 1982 in sports

Preceded by 1980–81 WHL season	WHL seasons	Succeeded by 1982–83 WHL season
