= 1978–79 NHL transactions =

The following is a list of all team-to-team transactions that have occurred in the National Hockey League during the 1978–79 NHL season. It lists what team each player has been traded to, signed by, or claimed by, and for which player(s) or draft pick(s), if applicable.

== Trades between teams ==
=== May ===
May 11, 1978	To Cleveland Barons Fred Ahern	To Colorado Rockies cash
May 15, 1978	To Toronto Maple Leafs cash future considerations^{1} (rights to Owen Lloyd)	To Minnesota North Stars Jim McKenny
May 30, 1978	To Toronto Maple Leafs Bob Neely	To Colorado Rockies cash

1. Trade completed on October 28, 1978.

=== June ===
June 2, 1978	To Philadelphia Flyers 1st-rd pick - 1978 Amateur Draft (# 7 - Ken Linseman)	To New York Rangers rights to hire Fred Shero as new Rangers head coach
June 12, 1978	To Vancouver Canucks 4th-rd pick - 1978 Amateur Draft (# 56 - Harald Luckner) future considerations	To St. Louis Blues Mike Walton
June 13, 1978	To Toronto Maple Leafs Dave Burrows; 6th-rd pick - 1978 Amateur Draft (# 92 - Mel Hewitt)	To Pittsburgh Penguins Randy Carlyle; George Ferguson
June 14, 1978	To Pittsburgh Penguins Tom Bladon; Orest Kindrachuk; Ross Lonsberry	To Philadelphia Flyers 1st-rd pick - 1978 Amateur Draft (# 6 - Behn Wilson) future considerations^{1} (8th-rd pick - 1978 Amateur Draft - # 126 - Jerry Price)
June 14, 1978	To Toronto Maple Leafs Paul Harrison	To Minnesota North Stars 4th-rd pick - 1981 Entry Draft (# 69 - Terry Tait)
June 14, 1978	To Toronto Maple Leafs Dave Hutchison; Lorne Stamler	To Los Angeles Kings Scott Garland; Brian Glennie; Kurt Walker; 2nd-rd pick - 1979 Entry Draft (# 30 - Mark Hardy)
June 15, 1978	To Minnesota North Stars 2nd-rd pick - 1981 Entry Draft (# 41 - Jali Wahlsten)	To St. Louis Blues Bob Stewart future considerations^{2} (Harvey Bennett Jr.)
June 15, 1978	To Colorado Rockies 2nd-rd pick - 1978 Amateur Draft (# 27 - Merlin Malinowski)	To Philadelphia Flyers 2nd-rd pick - 1979 Entry Draft (# 22 - Blake Wesley)
June 15, 1978	To St. Louis Blues 7th-rd pick - 1978 Amateur Draft (# 109 - Paul MacLean); 9th-rd pick - 1978 Amateur Draft (# 143 - Rick Simpson); 10th-rd pick - 1978 Amateur Draft (# 160 - Bob Froese); 11th-rd pick - 1978 Amateur Draft (# 175 - Dan Hermansson); 12th-rd pick - 1978 Amateur Draft (# 191 - Don Boyd); 13th-rd pick - 1978 Amateur Draft (# 205 - Carl Bloomberg); 14th-rd pick - 1978 Amateur Draft (# 216 - Joe Casey)	To Pittsburgh Penguins cash
June 15, 1978	To Philadelphia Flyers 10th-rd pick - 1978 Amateur Draft (# 167 - Rick Berard); 11th-rd pick - 1978 Amateur Draft (# 182 - Mark Berge)	To Buffalo Sabres cash
June 15, 1978	To Boston Bruins cash	To St. Louis Blues 10th-rd pick - 1978 Amateur Draft (# 170 -Dan Lerg); 11th-rd pick - 1978 Amateur Draft (# 185 - John Sullivan); 12th-rd pick - 1978 Amateur Draft (# 200 - Gerd Truntschka); 13th-rd pick - 1978 Amateur Draft (# 211 - Mike Pidgeon)
June 15, 1978	To Toronto Maple Leafs cash	To St. Louis Blues 11th-rd pick - 1978 Amateur Draft (# 181 - Jean-Francois Boutin); 12th-rd pick - 1978 Amateur Draft (# 197 - Paul Stasiuk); 13th-rd pick - 1978 Amateur Draft (# 212 - Brian Crombeen); 14th-rd pick - 1978 Amateur Draft (# 221 - Blair Wheeler)
June 15, 1978	To Vancouver Canucks cash	To Washington Capitals 12th-rd pick - 1978 Amateur Draft (# 189 - Steve Barger)
June 15, 1978	To Chicago Black Hawks cash	To Philadelphia Flyers 12th-rd pick - 1978 Amateur Draft (# 195 - Jim Olson)
June 15, 1978	To Los Angeles Kings cash	To St. Louis Blues 13th-rd pick - 1978 Amateur Draft (# 207 - Terry Kitching); 14th-rd pick - 1978 Amateur Draft (# 218 - Jim Farrell)
June 15, 1978	To Atlanta Flames cash	To St. Louis Blues 13th-rd pick - 1978 Amateur Draft (# 209 - Brian O'Connor); 14th-rd pick - 1978 Amateur Draft (# 220 - Frank Johnson)
June 15, 1978	To Colorado Rockies cash	To Washington Capitals 14th-rd pick - 1978 Amateur Draft (# 215 - Ray Irwin)
June 16, 1978	To Vancouver Canucks rights to Thomas Gradin	To Chicago Black Hawks 2nd-rd pick - 1980 Entry Draft^{3} (# 28 - Steve Ludzik)

1. Trade completed on June 15, 1978.
2. Trade completed on August 28, 1978.
3. Chicago had the option of the 2nd-rd pick in 1979 or 1980 NHL Entry Draft. They selected in the 1980 draft.

=== July ===
July 27, 1978	To Minnesota North Stars rights to Jack Carlson	To Detroit Red Wings future considerations

=== August ===
August 8, 1978	To Minnesota North Stars cash	To St. Louis Blues Bob Murdoch
August 31, 1978	To Colorado Rockies Joe Watson	To Philadelphia Flyers cash

=== September ===
September 6, 1978	To Boston Bruins Dick Redmond	To Atlanta Flames Gregg Sheppard
September 6, 1978	To Atlanta Flames Jean Pronovost	To Pittsburgh Penguins Gregg Sheppard
September 13, 1978	To Toronto Maple Leafs Garry Monahan	To Vancouver Canucks cash
September 18, 1978	To Boston Bruins future considerations	To Los Angeles Kings Doug Halward

=== October ===
October 5, 1978	To Toronto Maple Leafs Walt McKechnie	To Minnesota North Stars 3rd-rd pick - 1980 Entry Draft (# 53 - Randy Velischek)
October 5, 1978	To Montreal Canadiens 1st-rd pick - 1981 Entry Draft (# 18 - Gilbert Delorme)	To Los Angeles Kings Murray Wilson; 1st-rd pick - 1979 Entry Draft (# 16 - Jay Wells)
October 7, 1978	To Montreal Canadiens Mike Korney	To St. Louis Blues Gord McTavish
October 9, 1978	To Chicago Black Hawks 2nd-rd pick - 1980 Entry Draft (# 30 - Ken Solheim)	To Pittsburgh Penguins Dale Tallon
October 9, 1978	To Boston Bruins 1st-rd pick - 1979 Entry Draft (# 8 - Ray Bourque)	To Los Angeles Kings Ron Grahame
October 10, 1978	To Minnesota North Stars cash	To Atlanta Flames Gerry O'Flaherty
October 10, 1978	To St. Louis Blues Rick Bowness	To Detroit Red Wings cash
October 11, 1978	To Boston Bruins Mark Suzor	To Colorado Rockies Clayton Pachal
October 18, 1978	To Montreal Canadiens 1st-rd pick - 1981 Entry Draft (# 7 - Mark Hunter)	To Pittsburgh Penguins Rod Schutt
October 18, 1978	To Minnesota North Stars 1st-rd pick - 1979 Entry Draft (# 10 - Tom McCarthy)	To Washington Capitals Dennis Maruk
October 19, 1978	To Toronto Maple Leafs 2nd-rd pick - 1981 Entry Draft (# 24 - Gary Yaremchuk)	To Colorado Rockies Jack Valiquette
October 19, 1978	To Washington Capitals Michel Bergeron	To New York Islanders 2nd-rd pick - 1979 Entry Draft (# 25 - Tomas Jonsson)

=== November ===
November, 1978 exact date unknown	To Colorado Rockies Don Awrey	To New York Rangers cash
November 4, 1978	To Atlanta Flames Rod Seiling	To St. Louis Blues cash
November 17, 1978	To Vancouver Canucks Dunc Wilson	To Pittsburgh Penguins cash
November 18, 1978	To Colorado Rockies Nick Beverley	To Los Angeles Kings 4th-rd pick - 1982 Entry Draft (# 64 - Dave Gans)

=== December ===
December 6, 1978	To Los Angeles Kings rights to Steve Carlson	To Detroit Red Wings Steve Short
December 29, 1978	To Vancouver Canucks Drew Callander; Kevin McCarthy	To Philadelphia Flyers Dennis Ververgaert
December 31, 1978	To Los Angeles Kings Randy Holt	To Vancouver Canucks Don Kozak

=== January ===
January 16, 1979	To Los Angeles Kings Richard Mulhern; 2nd-rd pick - 1980 Entry Draft (CGY - # 31 - Tony Curtale)^{1}	To Atlanta Flames Bob Murdoch; 2nd-rd pick - 1980 Entry Draft (# 34 - Dave Morrison)

1. Atlanta relocated to Calgary for the 1980–81 NHL season.

=== February ===
February 6, 1979	To Buffalo Sabres Dave Schultz	To Pittsburgh Penguins Gary McAdam

=== March ===
March 3, 1979	To Colorado Rockies Don Saleski	To Philadelphia Flyers future considerations
March 12, 1979	To Buffalo Sabres 3rd-rd pick - 1979 Entry Draft (# 55 - Jacques Cloutier); 3rd-rd pick - 1980 Entry Draft (# 56 - Sean McKenna)	To New York Rangers Jocelyn Guevremont
March 12, 1979	To Minnesota North Stars future considerations	To Washington Capitals Chuck Arnason
March 13, 1979	To Toronto Maple Leafs Paul Gardner	To Colorado Rockies Don Ashby; Trevor Johansen
March 13, 1979	To Atlanta Flames Ivan Boldirev; Darcy Rota; Phil Russell	To Chicago Black Hawks Greg Fox; Tom Lysiak; Harold Phillipoff; Pat Ribble; Miles Zaharko

=== April ===
April 24, 1979	To Minnesota North Stars Chuck Arnason	To Washington Capitals cash
