= 1979 Memorial Cup =

Canadian junior men's ice hockey championship

Tournament details
- Venue(s): Palais des Sports (Sherbrooke, Quebec); Colisée de Trois-Rivières (Trois-Rivières, Quebec); Verdun Auditorium (Verdun, Quebec)
- Dates: May 6–13, 1979
- Teams: 3

Final positions
- Champions: Peterborough Petes (OMJHL) (1st title)

The Memorial Cup trophy

The 1979 Memorial Cup occurred May 6–13 at the Palais des Sports in Sherbrooke, Quebec, the Colisée de Trois-Rivières in Trois-Rivières, Quebec and at the Verdun Auditorium in Verdun, Quebec. It was the 61st annual Memorial Cup competition and determined the major junior ice hockey champion of the Canadian Hockey League (CHL). Participating teams were the winners of the Ontario Major Junior Hockey League, Quebec Major Junior Hockey League and Western Hockey League which were the Peterborough Petes, Trois-Rivières Draveurs and Brandon Wheat Kings. Peterborough won their first Memorial Cup, defeating Brandon in the final game.

== Teams ==
QMJHL Team/Host City OMJHL Team WHL Team Host Cities

=== Brandon Wheat Kings ===
The Brandon Wheat Kings represented the Western Hockey League at the 1979 Memorial Cup. The Wheat Kings were a dominant force during the 1978-79, finishing with a record-breaking 125 points, as the team had a record of 58–5–9. The Wheat Kings led the WHL in goals with 491, while the club allowed a league-low 230 goals. Brandon was the Regular Season Champs. In the post-season, the Wheat Kings finished the round-robin portion with a 7-1 record, advancing to the East Division finals. In their division finals series against the Saskatoon Blades, the Wheat Kings swept them in four games. In the WHL semi-finals, the Wheat Kings earned a 3-1 record in a round-robin tournament against the other two division winners, earning a trip to the President's Cup. In the final round, Brandon defeated the Portland Winter Hawks four games to two to win the WHL championship, and earning a trip to the 1979 Memorial Cup.

Brian Propp led the Wheat Kings offense, setting a league record with 94 goals and 194 points in 71 games, as he was the leading scorer in the league. In 22 playoff games, Propp scored 15 goals and 38 points to lead the club in scoring. Propp was a top prospect for the 1979 NHL entry draft, and he was drafted fourteenth overall by the Philadelphia Flyers. Ray Allison finished second in league scoring, as he scored 60 goals and 153 points in 62 games. Allison was another top prospect for the upcoming 1979 NHL entry draft, and was drafted by the Hartford Whalers eighteenth overall. Laurie Boschman scored 66 goals and 149 points in 65 games, as he would be drafted ninth overall by the Toronto Maple Leafs in the 1979 NHL entry draft. Defenseman Brad McCrimmon was another future first round draft pick in the 1979 NHL entry draft, as he scored 24 goals and 98 points in 66 games. McCrimmon was selected fifteenth overall by the Boston Bruins. Goaltender Rick Knickle was named WHL Goaltender of the Year after posting a record of 26-3-8 with a 3.16 GAA in 38 games. Scott Olson split time with Knickle, as in 35 games, he earned a 32-2-1 record with a 3.23 GAA.

The 1979 Memorial Cup was the Wheat Kings second appearance. The club lost the 1949 Memorial Cup to the Montreal Royals.

=== Peterborough Petes ===
The Peterborough Petes represented the Ontario Major Junior Hockey League at the 1979 Memorial Cup. This was the Petes second consecutive appearance at the tournament. Peterborough was the top team in the OMJHL during the 1978-79 season, earning a record of 46-19-3 for 95 points, winning the Hamilton Spectator Trophy. The Petes 345 goals ranked fourth in the league, while their defense allowed 245 goals, ranking them second in the OMJHL. In the Leyden Division semi-finals, the Petes defeated the Kingston Canadians four games to two, with one game ending in a tie. In the Leyden Division finals, Peterborough defeated the Sudbury Wolves four games to one, advancing to the OMJHL finals. In the J. Ross Robertson Cup finals, the Petes faced the Niagara Falls Flyers. The Flyers pushed Peterborough to seven games, however, the Petes won the championship and would represent the OMJHL at the 1979 Memorial Cup.

The Petes offense was led by Tim Trimper, who scored a team high 62 goals and 108 points in 66 games. Bill Gardner scored 32 goals and 103 points in 68 games to finish second in team scoring, while Chris Halyk also broke the 100-point plateau as he scored 41 goals and 100 points in 67 games. Defenseman Greg Theberge scored 20 goals and 80 points in 63 games. Theberge won the Max Kaminsky Trophy, awarded to the Top Defenseman in the OMJHL. In goal, Ken Ellacott posted a 3.53 GAA in 48 games as the Petes starting goaltender. Head coach Gary Green was named the winner of the Matt Leyden Trophy, awarded to the Top Head Coach in the league.

The 1979 Memorial Cup was the Petes fourth appearance in club history. In their previous three appearances in 1959, 1972, and in 1978, the Petes lost in the finals.

=== Trois-Rivières Draveurs ===
The Trois-Rivières Draveurs represented the Quebec Major Junior Hockey League at the 1979 Memorial Cup. This was the Draveurs second consecutive appearance at the tournament. The Draveurs were the top team in the league during the 1978-79 season, finishing with a record of 58-8-6, earning 122 points and winning the Jean Rougeau Trophy. Trois-Rivières scored a league high 527 goals, which was more than 100 goals higher than the second place team. The Draveurs were also the top defensive team in the league, allowing a league low 233 goals and winning the Robert Lebel Trophy. In the post-season, the Draveurs swept the Shawinigan Cataractes in four games in the QMJHL quarter-finals. In the league semi-finals, the Draveurs stayed hot, and defeated the Montreal Juniors four games to one. In the President's Cup finals, Trois-Rivières swept the Sherbrooke Castors in four games, winning the QMJHL championship for the second consecutive season, and earning a berth into the 1979 Memorial Cup.

The Draveurs offense was led by J.F. Sauve, who led the league with 176 points as he scored 65 goals and 111 assists. Sauve won the Jean Beliveau Trophy as the Top Scorer in the QMJHL. In the post-season, Sauve scored 19 goals and 38 points in 13 games to win the Guy Lafleur Trophy as Playoff MVP. Bob Mongrain scored a team high 66 goals, while earning 142 points to rank fourth in league scoring. Pierre Lacroix scored 37 goals and 137 points in 72 games, ranking him sixth in league scoring, and was named the winner of the Michel Briere Memorial Trophy winner as MVP of the league. Jean-Gaston Douville scored 61 goals and 116 points in 71 games, good for fourth in team scoring. Defenseman Michel Leblanc scored 26 goals and 110 points in 72 games, as the Draveurs had five players with 110 or more points. Goaltender Jacques Cloutier won the Jacques Plante Memorial Trophy as the Top Goaltender in the QMJHL. In 72 games, Cloutier had a record of 58-8-6 with a 3.14 GAA and a .877 save percentage. Cloutier posted a 12-1 record with a 2.77 GAA and a .901 save percentage in the post-season.

The 1979 Memorial Cup was the second appearance in Draveurs team history. At the 1978 Memorial Cup, the club finished in third place.

== Round-robin standings ==
Pos	Team	Pld	W	L	GF	GA	
1	Brandon Wheat Kings (WHL)	4	2	2	16	14	Advanced to final
2	Peterborough Petes (OMJHL)	4	2	2	15	15	Advanced to final
3	Trois-Rivières Draveurs (QMJHL)	4	2	2	11	13	

== Scores ==
Round-robin

- May 6 Trois-Rivières 4-3 Peterborough
- May 7 Trois-Rivières 4-1 Brandon
- May 8 Peterborough 7-6 Brandon (OT)
- May 9 Peterborough 3-2 Trois-Rivières
- May 10 Brandon 6-1 Trois-Rivières
- May 11 Brandon 3-2 Peterborough

Final

- May 13 Peterborough 2-1 Brandon (OT)

== Winning roster ==
Bob Attwell, Dave Beckon, Terry Bovair, Carmine Cirella, Keith Crowder, Ken Ellacott, Dave Fenyves, Larry Floyd, Bill Gardner, Chris Halyk, Anssi Melametsa, Larry Murphy, Mark Reeds, Brad Ryder, Stuart Smith, Greg Theberge, Tim Trimper, Jim Wiemer. Coach: Gary Green

== Award winners ==
- Stafford Smythe Memorial Trophy (MVP): Bart Hunter, Brandon
- George Parsons Trophy (Sportsmanship): Chris Halyk, Peterborough
- Hap Emms Memorial Trophy (Goaltender): Bart Hunter, Brandon

All-star team

- Goal: Bart Hunter, Brandon
- Defence: Normand Rochefort, Trois-Rivières; Brad McCrimmon, Brandon
- Centre: Laurie Boschman, Brandon
- Left wing: Ray Allison, Brandon
- Right wing: Tim Trimper, Peterborough
