= 1978–79 WHL season =

Junior ice hockey season

- League: Western Hockey League
- Sport: Ice hockey
- Teams: 12

Regular season
- Season champion: Brandon Wheat Kings (3)
- Season MVP: Perry Turnbull (Portland Winter Hawks)
- Top scorer: Brian Propp (Brandon Wheat Kings)

Playoffs
- Finals champions: Brandon Wheat Kings (1)
- Runners-up: Portland Winter Hawks

WHL seasons
- 1977–78 1979–80

1978–79 CHL season
- League: Canadian Hockey League
- Sport: Ice hockey
- Teams: 34

OMJHL

QMJHL

WHL

Memorial Cup
- Finals champions: Peterborough Petes (OMJHL) (1st title)
- Runners-up: Brandon Wheat Kings (WHL)

The 1978–79 WHL season was the 13th season of the Western Hockey League (WHL), and the first under that shortened name after previously operating as the Western Canada Hockey League. The season featured twelve teams and a 72-game regular season. The Brandon Wheat Kings secured their third consecutive regular season title, posting the league's best record—accumulating a league record 125 points in the standings—and followed the title up with the team's first playoff championship, defeating the Portland Winter Hawks in the final series to capture the President's Cup.

The season was the first—and only—season for the second incarnation of the Edmonton Oil Kings after the Flin Flon Bombers relocated to Edmonton prior to the season.

== Team changes ==
- The Flin Flon Bombers relocated to Edmonton, Alberta, becoming the Edmonton Oil Kings.

== Regular season ==
=== Final standings ===
East Division
Pos	Team	Pld	W	L	T	GF	GA	Pts
1	x – Brandon Wheat Kings	72	58	5	9	491	230	125
2	x – Saskatoon Blades	72	26	32	14	385	398	66
3	x – Edmonton Oil Kings	72	17	43	12	288	403	46
4	Regina Pats	72	18	47	7	297	481	43

x – qualified for playoffs

Central Division
Pos	Team	Pld	W	L	T	GF	GA	Pts
1	x – Billings Bighorns	72	38	23	11	378	302	87
2	x – Lethbridge Broncos	72	37	28	7	389	326	81
3	x – Calgary Wranglers	72	28	38	6	349	392	62
4	Medicine Hat Tigers	72	15	50	7	270	479	37

x – qualified for playoffs

West Division
Pos	Team	Pld	W	L	T	GF	GA	Pts
1	x – Portland Winter Hawks	72	49	10	13	432	265	111
2	x – Victoria Cougars	72	34	27	11	318	295	79
3	x – New Westminster Bruins	72	34	32	6	310	301	74
4	Seattle Breakers	72	21	40	11	299	334	53

x – qualified for playoffs

=== Scoring leaders ===
Note: GP = Games played; G = Goals; A = Assists; Pts = Points; PIM = Penalties in minutes

Player	Team	GP	G	A	Pts	PIM
Brian Propp	Brandon Wheat Kings	71	94	100	194	127
Ray Allison	Brandon Wheat Kings	62	60	93	153	191
Laurie Boschman	Brandon Wheat Kings	65	66	83	149	215
Duane Sutter	Lethbridge Broncos	71	50	75	125	212
Doug Morrison	Lethbridge Broncos	72	56	67	123	159
Kelly Kisio	Calgary Wranglers	70	60	61	121	73
Mike Toal	Portland Winter Hawks	71	38	83	121	32
Brent Ashton	Saskatoon Blades	62	64	65	119	180
Perry Turnbull	Portland Winter Hawks	70	75	43	118	191
Gord Williams	Lethbridge Broncos	72	58	59	117	60

== 1979 WHL Playoffs ==
=== Division semi-finals ===
Round robin format

- Brandon (7–1) advanced
- Saskatoon (3–5) advanced
- Edmonton (2–6) eliminated
- Lethbridge (5–3) advanced
- Calgary (4–4) advanced
- Billings (3–5) eliminated
- Portland (7–1) advanced
- Victoria (3–5) advanced
- New Westminster (2–6) eliminated

=== Division finals ===
- Brandon defeated Saskatoon 4 games to 0
- Lethbridge defeated Calgary 4 games to 3
- Portland defeated Victoria 4 games to 3

=== League semi-finals ===
Round Robin format

- Brandon (3–1) advanced
- Portland (3–1) advanced
- Lethbridge (0–4) eliminated

=== WHL Championship ===
- Brandon defeated Portland 4 games to 2

== WHL awards ==
Most Valuable Player: Perry Turnbull, Portland Winter Hawks
Top Scorer: Brian Propp, Brandon Wheat Kings
Most Sportsmanlike Player: Errol Rausse, Seattle Breakers
Top Defenseman: Keith Brown, Portland Winter Hawks
Rookie of the Year: Kelly Kisio, Calgary Wranglers
Top Goaltender: Rick Knickle, Brandon Wheat Kings
Coach of the Year: Dunc McCallum, Brandon Wheat Kings
Regular season champions: Brandon Wheat Kings

== All-Star teams ==
	First Team		Second Team	
Goal	Rick Knickle	Brandon Wheat Kings	Warren Skorodenski	Calgary Wranglers
Defense	Keith Brown	Portland Winter Hawks	Craig Levie	Edmonton Oil Kings
Defense	Brad McCrimmon	Brandon Wheat Kings	Blake Wesley	Portland Winter Hawks
Center	Laurie Boschman	Brandon Wheat Kings	Mike Toal	Portland Winter Hawks
Left Wing	Brian Propp	Brandon Wheat Kings	Perry Turnbull	Portland Winter Hawks
Right Wing	Ray Allison	Brandon Wheat Kings	Dirk Graham	Regina Pats

== See also ==
- 1979 Memorial Cup
- 1979 NHL entry draft
- 1978 in sports
- 1979 in sports

Preceded by 1977–78 WCHL season	WHL seasons	Succeeded by 1979–80 WHL season
