= Scott Garland =

Scott Garland may refer to:

- Scott Garland (attorney), Assistant US Attorney
- Scott Garland (ice hockey), Canadian ice hockey player
- Scott Garland (wrestler), American pro wrestler known as Scotty 2 Hotty
