= Stuart Smith (ice hockey) =

Canadian ice hockey player

- Born: March 17, 1960 (age 65); Toronto, Ontario, Canada
- Height: 6 ft 1 in (185 cm)
- Weight: 201 lb (91 kg; 14 st 5 lb)
- Position: Defence
- Shot: Right
- Played for: Hartford Whalers
- NHL draft: 39th overall, 1979; Hartford Whalers
- Playing career: 1979–1985

Stuart Gordon "Stu" Smith (born March 17, 1960) is a Canadian former professional ice hockey player who played 77 games in the National Hockey League for the Hartford Whalers between 1979 and 1983. The rest of his career, which lasted from 1979 to 1985, was spent in the minor American Hockey League. Internationally Smith played for the Canadian national junior team at the 1980 World Junior Championships

Smith was born in Toronto, Ontario.

== Career statistics ==
=== Regular season and playoffs ===
			Regular season					Playoffs
Season	Team	League	GP	G	A	Pts	PIM	GP	G	A	Pts	PIM
1976–77	Seneca Nationals	OPJHL	66	10	42	52	230	—	—	—	—	—
1977–78	Peterborough Petes	OMJHL	67	1	18	19	112	21	0	3	3	40
1977–78	Peterborough Petes	M-Cup	—	—	—	—	—	5	1	1	2	8
1978–79	Peterborough Petes	OMJHL	64	5	35	40	172	19	2	7	9	56
1978–79	Peterborough Petes	M-Cup	—	—	—	—	—	5	1	2	3	2
1979–80	Peterborough Petes	OMJHL	62	12	40	52	119	14	1	13	14	16
1979–80	Peterborough Petes	M-Cup	—	—	—	—	—	5	0	2	2	23
1979–80	Hartford Whalers	NHL	4	0	0	0	0	—	—	—	—	—
1980–81	Hartford Whalers	NHL	38	1	7	8	55	—	—	—	—	—
1980–81	Binghamton Whalers	AHL	42	3	9	12	63	—	—	—	—	—
1981–82	Hartford Whalers	NHL	17	0	3	3	15	—	—	—	—	—
1981–82	Binghamton Whalers	AHL	61	4	21	25	121	15	2	7	9	22
1982–83	Hartford Whalers	NHL	18	1	0	1	25	—	—	—	—	—
1982–83	Binghamton Whalers	AHL	50	3	8	11	97	5	0	1	1	12
1983–84	Binghamton Whalers	AHL	54	3	22	25	95	—	—	—	—	—
1984–85	New Haven Nighthawks	AHL	79	4	17	21	87	—	—	—	—	—
AHL totals			286	17	77	94	463	20	2	8	10	34
NHL totals			77	2	10	12	95	—	—	—	—	—

=== International ===
Year	Team	Event	GP	G	A	Pts	PIM
1980	Canada	WJC	5	1	1	2	10
Junior totals			5	1	1	2	10
