= Carmine Cirella =

Canadian ice hockey player (born 1960)

- Born: January 16, 1960 (age 66) Hamilton, Ontario, Canada
- Height: 6 ft 4 in (193 cm)
- Weight: 215 lb (98 kg; 15 st 5 lb)
- Position: Left wing
- Shot: Left
- Played for: Adirondack Red Wings; Maine Mariners
- NHL draft: 108th overall, 1979; Detroit Red Wings
- Playing career: 1980–1984

Carmine Cirella (born January 16, 1960) is a Canadian former professional ice hockey player.

== Junior career ==
Playing for the Peterborough Petes, he won the 1979 Memorial Cup.

== Professional career ==
He was drafted 108th overall by the Detroit Red Wings in the 1979 NHL entry draft. He never played in the National Hockey League, but played 283 games in the American Hockey League. His career was split between playing for the Adirondack Red Wings and the Maine Mariners. He also won the Calder Cup twice.

== International career ==
He competed at the 1980 World Junior Ice Hockey Championships.
