= Dave McDonald (ice hockey) =

Canadian ice hockey player

- Born: April 6, 1960 (age 66) Winnipeg, Manitoba, Canada
- Height: 6 ft 2 in (188 cm)
- Weight: 190 lb (86 kg; 13 st 8 lb)
- Position: Left wing
- Shot: Left
- Played for: Binghamton Whalers; Saginaw Gears
- NHL draft: 123rd overall, 1979; Hartford Whalers
- Playing career: 1980–1983

Dave McDonald (born April 6, 1960) is a Canadian former professional ice hockey player.

== Amateur career ==
He played junior A hockey for the Portage Terriers and St. James Canadians, Major Junior hockey for the Brandon Wheat Kings, and college hockey for the University of Minnesota-Duluth. He competed in the 1979 Memorial Cup.

== Professional career ==
He played 187 games, including playoffs, for the Binghamton Whalers of the American Hockey League. He also played 13 games for the Saginaw Gears of the International Hockey League. He also played in one game for the Mohawk Valley Stars of the Atlantic Coast Hockey League.
