= Rob Wilson (ice hockey) =

Ice hockey player (born 1968)

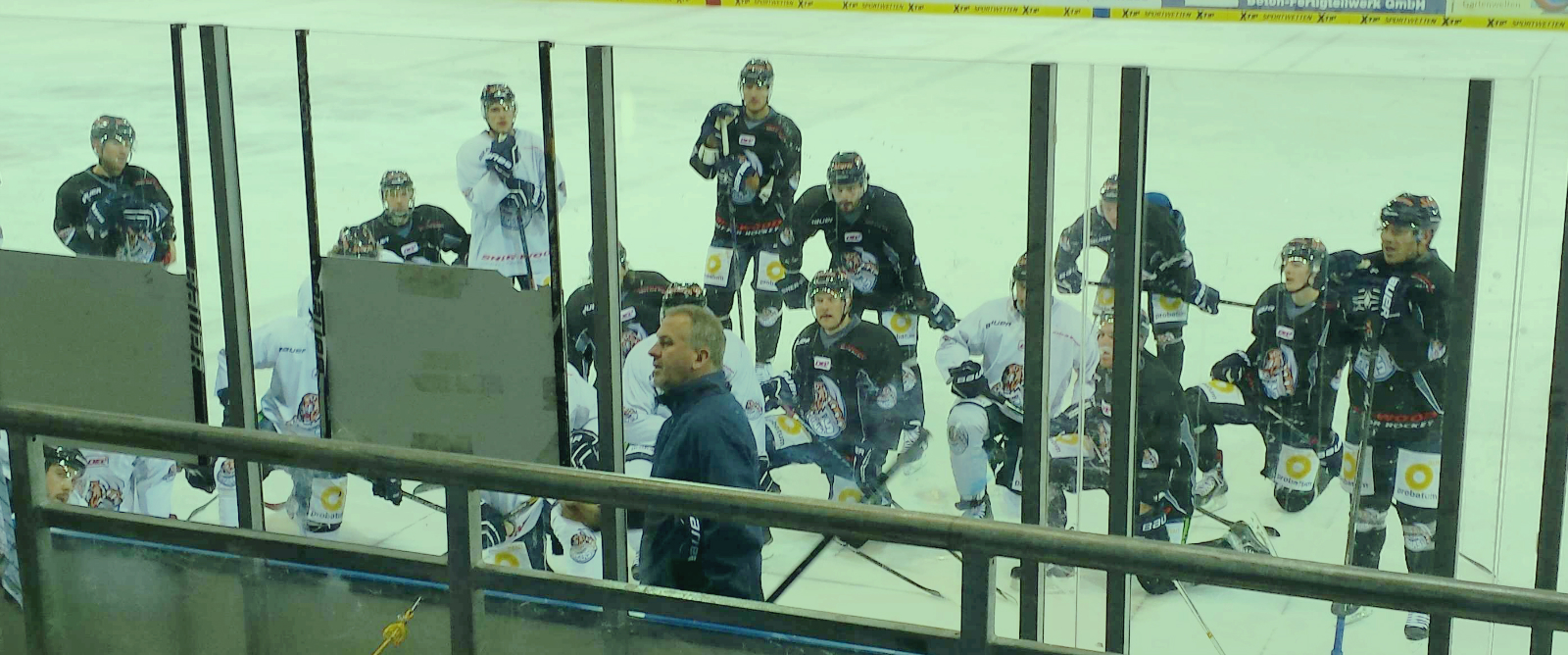
- Rob Wilson coaching in 2014
- Born: July 18, 1968 (age 57) Toronto, Ontario, Canada
- Height: 6 ft 3 in (191 cm)
- Weight: 212 lb (96 kg; 15 st 2 lb)
- Position: Defence
- Shot: Left
- Played for: Sheffield Steelers; Newcastle Jesters; Newcastle Vipers
- National team: Great Britain
- NHL draft: 235th overall, 1986; Pittsburgh Penguins
- Playing career: 1989–2009

Robert "Rob" Wilson (born July 18, 1968) is a Canadian-British professional ice hockey coach and a former professional ice hockey defenceman. He is head coach of the Peterborough Petes of the Ontario Hockey League. He is a member of the British ice hockey hall of fame.

== Playing career ==
Born in Toronto, Ontario, the beginning part of Wilson's playing career included a three-year stint with the Sudbury Wolves in the OHL and one year with the Peterborough Petes, before landing his first job in Great Britain. In 1989-90, Wilson played for the Swindon Wildcats, but it would then take until 1994 before he returned to England. In the meantime, he honed his skills in the ECHL, CoHL, SuHL and AHL.

In 1994-95, Wilson signed with the Sheffield Steelers of the British Hockey League, the following season saw him turn out for the Telford Tigers, then skate in the CHL and return to the Steelers.

He split the 1996-97 season between playing in the CHL and in the British Ice Hockey Superleague (BISL), again for the Sheffield Steelers. He stayed with the club until 2000 and then transferred to fellow BISL team Newcastle Jesters. Except a short spell in Italy, Wilson would play in England for the remainder of his career, including six years as a player-coach with the Newcastle Vipers. He retired in 2009 and was inducted into the British ice hockey Hall of Fame in 2011.

In the course of his playing career, Wilson represented the British National Team on the international stage on several occasions, including World Championships (Division I, Group B), winning a silver medal in 2001. He won a total of 34 caps for the British National Team and served as a team captain.

== Coaching career ==
Wilson served as player-coach of the Newcastle Vipers from 2003 to 2009 and then focussed on the job behind the bench. In 2005-06, he received EIHL Coach of the Year honors. He also joined the coaching staff of the British National Team as an assistant.

He left Newcastle after the 2009–10 campaign and embarked on a two-year stint as head coach of Italian second-division side AHC Neumarkt Egna Riwega. In 2012, he was hired by Rittner Buam of the Italian Serie A and remained at the helm until 2014. He led the team to winning the 2014 Italian championship and the 2014 Coppa Italia.

He took over head coaching duties at German top-tier club EHC Straubing for the 2014-15 season, but was fired in November 2014 after winning only three games at the start of the season. A couple of weeks later, he was hired as assistant coach of fellow Deutsche Eishockey Liga (DEL) side Nürnberg Ice Tigers. Wilson earned promotion to head coach for the 2015-16 season and guided the team to a playoff-semifinal appearance in his first year in the job. On December 8, 2016, his contract was extended until 2019. He received DEL Regular Season Coach of the Year honors in 2016-17. Like the year before, his team came up short in the 2017 semis, losing to Wolfsburg. For third time in a row, Wilson guided the Ice Tigers to the playoff-semis in the 2017–18 season. In early May 2018, he asked the club to terminate his contract for personal reasons.

On May 3, 2018, he joined the Peterborough Petes of the Ontario Hockey League as head coach. In 2023, Wilson led the Petes to their first OHL championship victory since 2006.
