= Rick Knickle =

Canadian ice hockey player

- Born: February 26, 1960 (age 66) Chatham, New Brunswick, Canada
- Height: 5 ft 10 in (178 cm)
- Weight: 175 lb (79 kg; 12 st 7 lb)
- Position: Goaltender
- Caught: Left
- Played for: Los Angeles Kings
- NHL draft: 116th overall, 1979; Buffalo Sabres
- Playing career: 1979–1997

Richard S. Knickle (born February 26, 1960) is a Canadian former professional ice hockey goaltender. He played 14 games in the National Hockey League with the Los Angeles Kings during the 1992–93 and 1993–94 seasons. The rest of his career, which lasted from 1979 to 1997, was spent in the minor leagues.

== Biography ==
As a youth, Knickle played in the 1971, 1972 and 1973 Quebec International Pee-Wee Hockey Tournaments with a minor ice hockey team from Greenwood, Nova Scotia. Knickle won the Ed Chynoweth Cup in 1979 with the Brandon Wheat Kings

He was drafted in the sixth round, 116th overall, by the Buffalo Sabres in the 1979 NHL entry draft. Knickle played for eleven different International Hockey League teams in his career. He won the Turner Cup in 1984 with the Flint Generals (1969–1985)

He later played fourteen games with the Los Angeles Kings in the National Hockey League. Knickle joined the Phoenix Coyotes as their Director of Amateur Scouting on July 28, 2011.

== Career statistics ==
=== Regular season and playoffs ===
			Regular season									Playoffs
Season	Team	League	GP	W	L	T	MIN	GA	SO	GAA	SV%	GP	W	L	MIN	GA	SO	GAA	SV%
1976–77	Yarmouth Mariners	MJRHL	13	—	—	—	780	40	1	3.08	—	—	—	—	—	—	—	—	—
1977–78	Brandon Travellers	MJHL	7	—	—	—	427	26	0	3.65	—	—	—	—	—	—	—	—	—
1977–78	Brandon Wheat Kings	WCHL	49	34	5	7	2806	182	0	3.89	.898	8	4	4	450	36	0	4.82	—
1978–79	Brandon Wheat Kings	WHL	38	26	3	8	2240	118	1	3.16	.909	16	12	3	886	41	1	2.78	—
1978–79	Brandon Wheat Kings	M-Cup	—	—	—	—	—	—	—	—	—	2	0	2	123	11	0	3.57	.863
1979–80	Brandon Wheat Kings	WHL	33	11	14	1	1604	125	0	4.68	.885	—	—	—	—	—	—	—	—
1979–80	Muskegon Mohawks	IHL	16	—	—	—	829	52	0	3.76	—	3	—	—	156	17	0	6.54	—
1980–81	Erie Blades	EHL	43	—	—	—	2347	125	1	3.20	—	8	—	—	446	14	0	1.88	—
1981–82	Rochester Americans	AHL	31	10	12	5	1753	108	1	3.70	—	3	0	2	125	7	0	3.37	—
1982–83	Flint Generals	IHL	27	—	—	—	1638	92	2	3.37	—	3	—	—	193	10	0	3.11	—
1982–83	Rochester Americans	AHL	4	0	3	0	143	11	0	4.64	—	—	—	—	—	—	—	—	—
1983–84	Flint Generals	IHL	60	32	21	5	3518	203	3	3.46	—	8	8	0	480	24	0	3.00	—
1984–85	Flint Generals	IHL	36	18	11	3	2018	115	2	3.42	—	7	3	4	401	27	0	4.04	—
1984–85	Sherbrooke Canadiens	AHL	14	7	6	0	780	53	0	4.08	—	—	—	—	—	—	—	—	—
1985–86	Saginaw Generals	IHL	39	16	15	0	2235	135	2	3.62	—	3	2	1	193	12	0	3.73	—
1986–87	Saginaw Generals	IHL	26	9	13	0	1413	113	0	4.80	—	5	1	4	329	21	0	3.83	—
1987–88	Flint Spirits	IHL	1	0	1	0	60	4	0	4.00	—	—	—	—	—	—	—	—	—
1987–88	Peoria Rivermen	IHL	13	2	8	1	705	58	0	4.94	—	6	3	3	294	20	0	4.08	—
1988–89	Fort Wayne Komets	IHL	47	22	16	0	2716	141	1	3.11	—	4	1	2	173	15	0	5.20	—
1989–90	Flint Spirits	IHL	55	25	24	1	2998	210	1	4.20	—	2	0	2	101	13	0	7.72	—
1990–91	Albany Choppers	IHL	14	4	6	2	679	52	0	4.59	—	—	—	—	—	—	—	—	—
1990–91	Springfield Indians	AHL	9	6	0	2	509	28	0	3.30	—	—	—	—	—	—	—	—	—
1991–92	San Diego Gulls	IHL	46	28	13	4	2686	155	0	3.46	—	2	0	1	78	3	0	2.31	—
1992–93	Los Angeles Kings	NHL	10	6	4	0	533	35	0	3.95	.880	—	—	—	—	—	—	—	—
1992–93	San Diego Gulls	IHL	41	33	4	4	2437	88	4	2.17	.909	—	—	—	—	—	—	—	—
1993–94	Los Angeles Kings	NHL	4	1	2	0	174	9	0	3.11	.873	—	—	—	—	—	—	—	—
1993–94	Phoenix Roadrunners	IHL	25	8	9	3	1292	89	1	4.13	.876	—	—	—	—	—	—	—	—
1994–95	Detroit Vipers	IHL	49	24	15	5	2725	134	3	2.95	>899	—	—	—	—	—	—	—	—
1995–96	Detroit Vipers	IHL	18	9	5	1	872	50	0	3.44	>874	—	—	—	—	—	—	—	—
1995–96	Las Vegas Thunder	IHL	7	6	1	0	420	27	0	3.86	.885	4	1	0	126	7	0	3.33	.889
1996–97	Milwaukee Admirals	IHL	19	5	9	1	940	60	0	3.83	.877	—	—	—	—	—	—	—	—
IHL totals			539	—	—	—	30,181	1778	19	3.53	—	47	—	—	2524	169	0	4.02	—
NHL totals			14	7	6	0	707	44	0	3.74	.879	—	—	—	—	—	—	—	—

== Awards ==
- WHL First All-Star Team – 1979
