= Greg Theberge =

Canadian ice hockey player and broadcaster

- Born: September 3, 1959 (age 66) Peterborough, Ontario, Canada
- Height: 5 ft 11 in (180 cm)
- Weight: 190 lb (86 kg; 13 st 8 lb)
- Position: Defence
- Shot: Left
- Played for: Washington Capitals
- NHL draft: 109th overall, 1979; Washington Capitals
- Playing career: 1979–1984

Greg Ray Theberge (born September 3, 1959) is a Canadian broadcaster and former professional ice hockey defenceman. He played 153 games in the National Hockey League with the Washington Capitals from 1979 to 1983. He was selected 109th overall by the Capitals in the 1979 NHL entry draft.

== Biography ==
Theberge was born in Peterborough, Ontario.

As a youth, he played in the 1972 Quebec International Pee-Wee Hockey Tournament with a minor ice hockey team from Peterborough. Theberge spent his OHL career with his hometown Peterborough Petes. He won the Calder Cup with the Hersey Bears in 1980.

His son, Brett, was member of the Petes. Theberge is the grandson of former NHL player and Hall of Famer Dit Clapper.

Theberge is currently the colour commentator for TVCogeco covering the North Bay Battalion, alongside play-by-play man Ranjan Rupal.

== Career statistics ==
=== Regular season and playoffs ===
			Regular season					Playoffs
Season	Team	League	GP	G	A	Pts	PIM	GP	G	A	Pts	PIM
1975–76	Wexford Warriors	MetJBHL	36	15	19	34	40	—	—	—	—	—
1976–77	Peterborough Petes	OMJHL	65	10	22	32	47	4	1	1	2	0
1977–78	Peterborough Petes	OMJHL	66	13	54	67	88	19	3	12	15	18
1977–78	Peterborough Petes	M-Cup	—	—	—	—	—	5	3	0	3	4
1978–79	Peterborough Petes	OMJHL	63	20	60	80	90	19	8	9	17	40
1978–79	Peterborough Petes	M-Cup	—	—	—	—	—	5	0	0	0	2
1979–80	Washington Capitals	NHL	12	0	1	1	0	—	—	—	—	—
1979–80	Hershey Bears	AHL	58	7	22	29	31	16	5	6	11	18
1980–81	Washington Capitals	NHL	1	1	0	1	0	—	—	—	—	—
1980–81	Hershey Bears	AHL	78	12	53	65	117	10	0	4	4	12
1981–82	Washington Capitals	NHL	57	5	32	37	49	—	—	—	—	—
1982–83	Washington Capitals	NHL	70	8	28	36	20	4	0	1	1	0
1982–83	Hershey Bears	AHL	6	1	5	6	2	—	—	—	—	—
1983–84	Washington Capitals	NHL	13	1	2	3	4	—	—	—	—	—
1983–84	Hershey Bears	AHL	41	3	27	30	25	—	—	—	—	—
1984–85	EHC Olten	NLB	40	20	22	42	—	—	—	—	—	—
1985–86	EV Zug	NLB	26	5	19	24	26	—	—	—	—	—
1986–87	Augsburger EV	GER-2	16	8	23	31	18	—	—	—	—	—
AHL totals			183	23	107	130	175	26	5	10	15	30
NHL totals			153	15	63	78	73	4	0	1	1	0
