= Gord Williams =

Canadian ice hockey player

- Born: April 10, 1960 (age 64); Saskatoon, Saskatchewan, Canada
- Height: 5 ft 11 in (180 cm)
- Weight: 168 lb (76 kg; 12 st 0 lb)
- Position: Right wing
- Shot: Right
- Played for: Philadelphia Flyers
- NHL draft: 119th overall, 1979; Philadelphia Flyers
- Playing career: 1980–1983

Gordon James Williams (born April 10, 1960) is a Canadian former professional ice hockey winger. He played two games in the National Hockey League with the Philadelphia Flyers, one each in the 1981–82 and 1982–83 seasons. The rest of his career, which lasted from 1980 to 1983, was spent in the minor leagues. His older brother, Fred Williams, also played in the NHL.

== Career statistics ==
			Regular season					Playoffs
Season	Team	League	GP	G	A	Pts	PIM	GP	G	A	Pts	PIM
1976–77	Taber Golden Suns	AJHL	60	35	28	63	53	—	—	—	—	—
1977–78	Lethbridge Broncos	WCHL	71	12	26	38	80	4	2	1	3	4
1978–79	Lethbridge Broncos	WHL	72	58	59	117	60	19	14	16	30	8
1979–80	Lethbridge Broncos	WHL	72	57	65	122	92	4	3	2	5	4
1980–81	Maine Mariners	AHL	65	14	12	26	62	12	3	5	8	4
1981–82	Philadelphia Flyers	NHL	1	0	0	0	2	—	—	—	—	—
1981–82	Maine Mariners	AHL	73	31	25	56	35	4	1	1	2	0
1982–83	Philadelphia Flyers	NHL	1	0	0	0	0	—	—	—	—	—
1982–83	Maine Mariners	AHL	56	26	37	63	34	8	2	4	6	4
AHL totals			194	71	74	145	131	24	6	10	16	8
NHL totals			2	0	0	0	2	—	—	—	—	—
