= Doug Morrison =

Canadian ice hockey player

- Born: February 2, 1960 (age 65); Vancouver, British Columbia, Canada
- Height: 5 ft 10 in (178 cm)
- Weight: 185 lb (84 kg; 13 st 3 lb)
- Position: Right wing
- Shot: Right
- Played for: Boston Bruins; HC Merano
- NHL draft: 36th overall, 1979; Boston Bruins
- Playing career: 1980–1992

Doug Morrison (born February 1, 1960) is a Canadian former professional ice hockey player who played 23 games in the National Hockey League with the Boston Bruins between 1980 and 1985. The rest of his career, which lasted from 1980 to 1992, was mainly spent in the minor American Hockey League, and later in Europe. Doug is the brother of Mark Morrison, who also played in the NHL. Their sister married fellow Canadian hockey player Garth Butcher.

Morrison scored seven NHL goals--all during the 1980-81 season. His first NHL goal occurred on November 27, 1980, in his team's 3-3 tie with Pittsburgh at Boston Garden. Morrison recorded a hattrick versus the Los Angeles Kings on December 14, 1980, with all three goals consecutively in the third period.

== Career statistics ==
=== Regular season and playoffs ===
			Regular season					Playoffs
Season	Team	League	GP	G	A	Pts	PIM	GP	G	A	Pts	PIM
1975–76	Richmond Sockeyes	PCJHL	40	37	47	84	82	—	—	—	—	—
1976–77	Lethbridge Broncos	WCHL	70	24	35	59	80	15	3	3	6	0
1977–78	Lethbridge Broncos	WCHL	66	25	45	70	116	8	2	3	5	4
1978–79	Lethbridge Broncos	WHL	64	56	67	123	159	19	20	15	35	7
1979–80	Lethbridge Broncos	WHL	68	58	59	117	188	4	5	3	8	15
1979–80	Boston Bruins	NHL	1	0	0	0	0	—	—	—	—	—
1980–81	Boston Bruins	NHL	18	7	3	10	13	—	—	—	—	—
1980–81	Springfield Indians	AHL	42	19	30	49	28	7	4	5	9	2
1981–82	Boston Bruins	NHL	3	0	0	0	0	—	—	—	—	—
1981–82	Erie Blades	AHL	75	23	35	58	31	—	—	—	—	—
1982–83	Maine Mariners	AHL	61	38	29	67	44	14	5	1	6	4
1983–84	Hershey Bears	AHL	72	38	40	78	42	—	—	—	—	—
1984–85	Boston Bruins	NHL	1	0	0	0	2	—	—	—	—	—
1984–85	Hershey Bears	AHL	65	28	25	53	25	—	—	—	—	—
1985–86	Salt Lake Golden Eagles	IHL	80	27	34	61	30	5	7	3	10	14
1986–87	Salt Lake Golden Eagles	IHL	73	48	39	87	24	17	9	8	17	26
1987–88	EC Hedos München	GER-2	28	64	55	119	71	18	20	16	36	25
1988–89	EC Hedos München	GER-2	28	50	42	92	88	18	23	21	44	55
1989–90	HC Merano	ITA	25	25	23	48	18	—	—	—	—	—
1989–90	EHC Uzwil	NLB	10	7	10	17	12	—	—	—	—	—
1990–91	EC Bad Tölz	GER-2	1	0	1	1	2	—	—	—	—	—
1991–92	EC Peiting	GER-3	14	11	17	28	10	12	13	18	31	11
AHL totals			315	146	159	305	170	21	9	6	15	6
NHL totals			23	7	3	10	15	—	—	—	—	—
