= Mike Toal =

Canadian ice hockey player

- Born: March 23, 1959 (age 67) Red Deer, Alberta, Canada
- Height: 6 ft 0 in (183 cm)
- Weight: 178 lb (81 kg; 12 st 10 lb)
- Position: Centre
- Shot: Right
- Played for: Edmonton Oilers
- NHL draft: 105th overall, 1979; Edmonton Oilers
- Playing career: 1979–1982

Michael James Toal (born March 23, 1959) is a Canadian former professional ice hockey centre. Selected in the fifth round (105th overall) in the 1979 NHL entry draft by the Edmonton Oilers, he played three games for the Oilers in the 1979–80 season. As a junior player, he was named to the WHL Second All-Star Team in 1979 after a productive season with the Portland Winter Hawks. After spending most of three seasons in the minor leagues, Toal retired in 1982.

== Career statistics ==
=== Regular season and playoffs ===
			Regular season					Playoffs
Season	Team	League	GP	G	A	Pts	PIM	GP	G	A	Pts	PIM
1975–76	Red Deer Royals	AAHA	—	—	—	—	—	—	—	—	—	—
1976–77	Red Deer Rustlers	AJHL	1	0	2	2	0	—	—	—	—	—
1976–77	Victoria Cougars	WCHL	29	6	12	18	25	—	—	—	—	—
1976–77	Calgary Centennials	WCHL	34	10	11	21	11	4	0	1	1	0
1977–78	Billings Bighorns	WCHL	69	30	34	64	48	19	5	13	18	4
1978–79	Portland Winter Hawks	WHL	71	38	83	121	32	25	13	20	33	13
1979–80	Edmonton Oilers	NHL	3	0	0	0	0	—	—	—	—	—
1979–80	Houston Apollos	CHL	76	31	45	76	47	6	1	0	1	2
1980–81	Rochester Americans	AHL	14	0	0	0	84	—	—	—	—	—
1980–81	Wichita Wind	CHL	70	16	18	34	63	—	—	—	—	—
1981–82	Wichita Wind	CHL	55	15	15	30	14	1	0	0	0	0
CHL totals			201	62	78	140	124	7	1	0	1	2
NHL totals			3	0	0	0	0	—	—	—	—	—

== Awards ==
- WHL Second All-Star Team – 1979
