= Perry Turnbull =

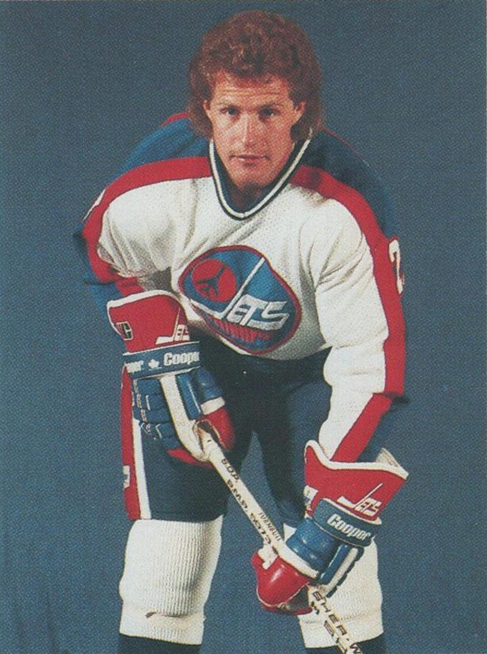
- Born: March 9, 1959 (age 67) Bentley, Alberta, Canada
- Height: 6 ft 2 in (188 cm)
- Weight: 200 lb (91 kg; 14 st 4 lb)
- Position: Left wing
- Shot: Left
- Played for: St. Louis Blues; Montreal Canadiens; Winnipeg Jets
- NHL draft: 2nd overall, 1979; St. Louis Blues
- Playing career: 1979–1988

Perry John Turnbull (born March 9, 1959) is a Canadian former professional ice hockey player who played 608 career games for the St. Louis Blues, Montreal Canadiens and Winnipeg Jets.

Turnbull's son is Travis Turnbull, also a professional ice hockey player.

== Career statistics ==
			Regular season					Playoffs
Season	Team	League	GP	G	A	Pts	PIM	GP	G	A	Pts	PIM
1974–75	The Pass Red Devils	AJHL	69	6	4	10	134	—	—	—	—	—
1975–76	The Pass Red Devils	AJHL	45	27	23	50	140	—	—	—	—	—
1975–76	Calgary Centennials	WCHL	19	6	7	13	14	—	—	—	—	—
1976–77	Calgary Centennials	WCHL	10	8	5	13	33	—	—	—	—	—
1976–77	Portland Winter Hawks	WCHL	58	23	30	53	249	10	2	1	3	36
1977–78	Portland Winter Hawks	WCHL	57	36	27	63	318	8	2	3	5	44
1978–79	Portland Winter Hawks	WHL	70	75	43	118	191	20	10	8	18	33
1979–80	St. Louis Blues	NHL	80	16	19	35	124	3	1	1	2	2
1980–81	St. Louis Blues	NHL	75	34	22	56	209	—	—	—	—	—
1981–82	St. Louis Blues	NHL	79	33	26	59	161	5	3	2	5	11
1982–83	St. Louis Blues	NHL	79	32	15	47	172	4	1	0	1	14
1983–84	St. Louis Blues	NHL	32	14	8	22	81	—	—	—	—	—
1983–84	Montreal Canadiens	NHL	40	6	7	13	59	9	1	2	3	10
1984–85	Winnipeg Jets	NHL	66	22	21	43	130	8	0	1	1	26
1985–86	Winnipeg Jets	NHL	80	20	31	51	183	3	0	1	1	11
1986–87	Winnipeg Jets	NHL	25	1	5	6	44	1	0	0	0	10
1987–88	St. Louis Blues	NHL	51	10	9	19	82	1	0	0	0	2
1986–87	Peoria Rivermen	IHL	3	5	0	5	4	—	—	—	—	—
1988–89	HC Asiago	ITA	32	31	27	58	131	—	—	—	—	—
1989–90	HC Asiago	ITA	34	24	29	53	68	1	1	1	2	5
1990–91	HC Asiago	ITA	18	14	8	22	29	10	8	3	11	41
1991–92	EC Dorsten	DEU III	42	55	50	105	187	—	—	—	—	—
NHL totals			608	188	163	351	1245	34	6	7	13	86
ITA totals			84	69	64	133	228	11	9	4	13	46

== Coaching statistics ==
Season  Team             Lge Type       GP  W L T OTL   Pct
1994-95 St. Louis Vipers RHI Head Coach 22 13 7 2   0 0.636 

== Awards ==
- WHL Second All-Star Team – 1979

Awards and achievements
Preceded by Wayne Babych	St. Louis Blues first-round draft pick 1979	Succeeded by Rik Wilson
