= Tim Trimper =

Canadian ice hockey player

- Born: September 28, 1958 (age 67) Windsor, Ontario, Canada
- Height: 5 ft 9 in (175 cm)
- Weight: 184 lb (83 kg; 13 st 2 lb)
- Position: Left wing
- Shot: Left
- Played for: Chicago Black Hawks; Winnipeg Jets; Minnesota North Stars
- NHL draft: 28th overall, 1979; Chicago Black Hawks
- Playing career: 1979–1985

Timothy Edward Trimper (born September 28, 1958) is a Canadian former professional ice hockey forward who played 190 games in the National Hockey League for the Minnesota North Stars, Winnipeg Jets, and Chicago Black Hawks. As a youth, he played in the 1971 and 1972 Quebec International Pee-Wee Hockey Tournaments with a minor ice hockey team from Brampton.

== Career statistics ==
=== Regular season and playoffs ===
			Regular season					Playoffs
Season	Team	League	GP	G	A	Pts	PIM	GP	G	A	Pts	PIM
1975–76	Royal York Royals	OPJAHL	37	2	16	18	47	—	—	—	—	—
1976–77	Peterborough Petes	OMJHL	62	14	11	25	95	4	0	1	1	2
1977–78	Peterborough Petes	OMJHL	59	26	34	60	73	21	8	8	16	25
1977–78	Peterborough Petes	M-Cup	—	—	—	—	—	5	2	5	7	8
1978–79	Peterborough Petes	OMJHL	66	62	46	108	97	17	7	24	31	25
1978–79	Peterborough Petes	M-Cup	—	—	—	—	—	5	3	3	6	8
1979–80	Chicago Black Hawks	NHL	30	6	13	19	10	1	0	0	0	2
1979–80	New Brunswick Hawks	AHL	43	26	31	57	18	—	—	—	—	—
1980–81	New Brunswick Hawks	AHL	19	7	8	15	21	—	—	—	—	—
1980–81	Winnipeg Jets	NHL	56	15	14	29	28	—	—	—	—	—
1981–82	Winnipeg Jets	NHL	74	8	8	16	100	1	0	0	0	0
1982–83	Winnipeg Jets	NHL	5	0	0	0	0	—	—	—	—	—
1982–83	Sherbrooke Jets	AHL	68	28	38	66	53	—	—	—	—	—
1983–84	Winnipeg Jets	NHL	5	0	0	0	0	—	—	—	—	—
1983–84	Sherbrooke Jets	AHL	31	10	24	34	26	—	—	—	—	—
1983–84	Salt Lake Golden Eagles	CHL	35	18	27	45	26	5	4	3	7	9
1984–85	Minnesota North Stars	NHL	20	1	4	5	15	—	—	—	—	—
1984–85	Springfield Indians	AHL	60	27	34	61	84	4	1	3	4	9
AHL totals			221	98	135	233	202	4	1	3	4	9
NHL totals			190	30	39	69	153	2	0	0	0	2
