= 1979 NHL entry draft =

1979 North American ice hockey draft

General information
- Date: August 9, 1979
- Location: Queen Elizabeth Hotel; Montreal, Quebec, Canada

Overview
- 126 total selections in 6 rounds
- First selection: (Canada) Rob Ramage (Colorado Rockies)
- Hall of Famers: 7: RW Mike Gartner; D Ray Bourque; LW Michel Goulet; D Kevin Lowe; C Guy Carbonneau; C Mark Messier; RW Glenn Anderson

The 1979 NHL entry draft was the 17th draft for the National Hockey League. It took place on August 9, 1979, at the Queen Elizabeth Hotel in Montreal. The NHL teams selected 126 players eligible for entry into professional ranks, in the reverse order of the 1978–79 NHL season and playoff standings. The draft was the first to be conducted after the NHL–WHA merger, which had included its own 1979 NHL expansion draft, held on June 13, 1979. As part of the terms of the merger, the four former WHA teams had joined the NHL on the condition that they be placed at the bottom of the entry draft order, as opposed to the top of the order as is usually the case for expansion teams.

In addition, the minimum draft age was lowered from 20 to 19 with the addition of any underage players who had already played in the WHA. The NHL had been considering lowering the draft age for some time, and timed the decision to lower the draft age at least in part to coincide with the merger. The lowering of the draft age caused two years' worth of draft picks to go in the same draft, contributing to what is generally considered one of the best draft classes in NHL entry draft history, which included seven future Hall of Famers: Ray Bourque, Mike Gartner, Michel Goulet and Kevin Lowe were selected in the first round alone, while Mark Messier, Glenn Anderson, and Guy Carbonneau would be drafted in later rounds. 12 of the 21 players selected in the first round would play in at least one All-Star game, 19 of the 21 would play at least 450 career NHL games, and all 21 had NHL careers of at least 235 games. Under the old rules, Wayne Gretzky and Messier would not have been eligible to enter the NHL until the 1981 draft.

On the other hand, the NHL shortened the draft to only six rounds, whereas some previous drafts ran for more than twenty rounds. As a result, in spite of the larger number of teams participating the 1979 draft had 108 fewer selections than the previous draft and was the shortest draft since 1971. It is the last entry draft to have fewer than 200 selections. Due to the strength of the class and fewer selections, there are many undrafted players who were eligible to be drafted who went on to have notable NHL careers, including Hall of Famer Dino Ciccarelli, five-time Stanley Cup champion Charlie Huddy and four-time 50-goal scorer Tim Kerr. Gretzky, protected by the Oilers in the 1979 NHL expansion draft, also entered the Hall of Fame.

As consolation for lowering the minimum age for the draft, the NHL provided junior teams with CA$40,000 (equivalent to $164,000 in 2025) in compensation for each under-age player selected and signed. Under-aged players were also offered back to junior clubs before being able to play in the minor leagues.

The last active player in the NHL from this draft class was Mark Messier, who played his last NHL game in the 2003–04 season.

== Absence of Wayne Gretzky ==
Rising superstar Wayne Gretzky had played for the Edmonton Oilers in the WHA's final season. As per the terms of the NHL-WHA merger, Gretzky was to have become eligible for the 1979 draft due to having already played professionally in the WHA. However, Gretzky had a personal services contract with Oilers owner Peter Pocklington.

The NHL had originally expected the contract would be voided. Gretzky, faced with the likelihood of having to play for the struggling Colorado Rockies if he were to enter the draft, refused to void his contract with Pocklington. It was determined that the Oilers were allowed to keep Gretzky in exchange for being placed at the bottom of the draft order in the entry draft.

== Selections by round ==
Below are listed the selections in the 1979 NHL entry draft. Club teams are located in North America unless otherwise noted.

= NHL All-Star team ·	= NHL All-Star (Note: Players are identified as an All-Star if they were selected for the All-Star game at any time in their career.) ·	= NHL All-Star and NHL All-Star team ·	= Hall of Famers

=== Round one ===
#	Player	Nationality	NHL team	College/junior/club team
1	Rob Ramage (D)	Canada	Colorado Rockies	Birmingham Bulls (WHA)
2	Perry Turnbull (LW)	Canada	St. Louis Blues	Portland Winter Hawks (WHL)
3	Mike Foligno (RW)	Canada	Detroit Red Wings	Sudbury Wolves (OHL)
4	Mike Gartner (RW)	Canada	Washington Capitals	Cincinnati Stingers (WHA)
5	Rick Vaive (RW)	Canada	Vancouver Canucks	Birmingham Bulls (WHA)
6	Craig Hartsburg (D)	Canada	Minnesota North Stars	Birmingham Bulls (WHA)
7	Keith Brown (D)	Canada	Chicago Black Hawks	Portland Winter Hawks (WHL)
8	Ray Bourque (D)	Canada	Boston Bruins (from Los Angeles)	Verdun Eperviers (QMJHL)
9	Laurie Boschman (C)	Canada	Toronto Maple Leafs	Brandon Wheat Kings (WHL)
10	Tom McCarthy (LW)	Canada	Minnesota North Stars (from Pittsburgh via Washington)	Oshawa Generals (OHL)
11	Mike Ramsey (D)	United States	Buffalo Sabres	University of Minnesota (WCHA)
12	Paul Reinhart (D)	Canada	Atlanta Flames	Kitchener Rangers (OHL)
13	Doug Sulliman (LW)	Canada	New York Rangers	Kitchener Rangers (OHL)
14	Brian Propp (LW)	Canada	Philadelphia Flyers	Brandon Wheat Kings (WHL)
15	Brad McCrimmon (D)	Canada	Boston Bruins	Brandon Wheat Kings (WHL)
16	Jay Wells (D)	Canada	Los Angeles Kings (from Montreal)	Kingston Canadians (OHL)
17	Duane Sutter (RW)	Canada	New York Islanders	Lethbridge Broncos (WHL)
18	Ray Allison (RW)	Canada	Hartford Whalers	Brandon Wheat Kings (WHL)
19	Jimmy Mann (RW)	Canada	Winnipeg Jets	Sherbrooke Castors (QMJHL)
20	Michel Goulet (LW)	Canada	Quebec Nordiques	Birmingham Bulls (WHA)
21	Kevin Lowe (D)	Canada	Edmonton Oilers	Quebec Remparts (QMJHL)
^{Reference: "1979 NHL Entry Draft hockeydraftcentral.com". Archived from the original on January 22, 2009.}

Notes

1. The Los Angeles Kings' first round pick went to the Boston Bruins as the result of a trade on October 9, 1978 that sent Ron Grahame to the Los Angeles Kings in exchange for this pick.
2. The Pittsburgh Penguins' first round pick went to the Minnesota North Stars as the result of a trade on October 18, 1978, that sent Dennis Maruk to Washington in exchange for this pick.
  Washington previously acquired this pick as the result of a trade on October 17, 1977 that sent Hartland Monahan to the Pittsburgh Penguins in exchange for this pick.
3. The Montreal Canadiens' first round pick went to the Los Angeles Kings as the result of a trade on October 5, 1978, that sent the first round pick in 1981 to the Montreal Canadiens in exchange for Murray Wilson and this pick.

=== Round two ===
#	Player	Nationality	NHL team	College/junior/club team
22	Blake Wesley (D)	Canada	Philadelphia Flyers (from Colorado)	Portland Winter Hawks (WHL)
23	Mike Perovich (D)	Canada	Atlanta Flames (from St. Louis)	Brandon Wheat Kings (WHL)
24	Errol Rausse (LW)	Canada	Washington Capitals (from Detroit)	Seattle Breakers (WHL)
25	Tomas Jonsson (D)	Sweden	New York Islanders (from Washington)	Modo Hockey (Sweden)
26	Brent Ashton (LW)	Canada	Vancouver Canucks	Saskatoon Blades (WHL)
27	Gaston Gingras (D)	Canada	Montreal Canadiens (from Minnesota)	Birmingham Bulls (WHA)
28	Tim Trimper (LW)	Canada	Chicago Blackhawks	Peterborough Petes (OMJHL)
29	Dean Hopkins (RW)	Canada	Los Angeles Kings	London Knights (OMJHL)
30	Mark Hardy (D)	Canada	Los Angeles Kings (from Toronto)	Montreal Juniors (QMJHL)
31	Paul Marshall (LW)	Canada	Pittsburgh Penguins	Brantford Alexanders (OMJHL)
32	Lindy Ruff (D)	Canada	Buffalo Sabres	Lethbridge Broncos (WHL)
33	Pat Riggin (G)	Canada	Atlanta Flames	Birmingham Bulls (WHA)
34	Ed Hospodar (D)	United States/ Canada	New York Rangers	Ottawa 67's (OMJHL)
35	Pelle Lindbergh (G)	Sweden	Philadelphia Flyers	AIK IF (Sweden)
36	Doug Morrison (RW)	Canada	Boston Bruins	Lethbridge Broncos (WHL)
37	Mats Naslund (LW)	Sweden	Montreal Canadiens	Brynas IF (Sweden)
38	Billy Carroll (C)	Canada	New York Islanders	London Knights (OMJHL)
39	Stuart Smith (D)	Canada	Hartford Whalers	Peterborough Petes (OMJHL)
40	Dave Christian (C)	United States	Winnipeg Jets	University of North Dakota (WCHA)
41	Dale Hunter (C)	Canada	Quebec Nordiques	Sudbury Wolves (OMJHL)
42	Neal Broten (C)	United States	Minnesota North Stars (from Edmonton)	University of Minnesota (WCHA)
^{Reference: "1979 NHL Entry Draft hockeydraftcentral.com". Archived from the original on February 20, 2009.}

Notes

1. The Colorado Rockies' second round pick went to the Philadelphia Flyers as the result of a trade on June 15, 1978, that sent the second round pick in 1978 to the Colorado Rockies in exchange for this pick.
2. The St. Louis Blues' second round pick went to the Atlanta Flames as the result of a trade on December 12, 1977, that sent Curt Bennett, Phil Myre, and Barry Gibbs to the St. Louis Blues in exchange for Yves Belanger, Dick Redmond, Bob MacMillan and this pick.
3. The Detroit Red Wings' second round pick went to the Washington Capitals as the result of a trade on August 17, 1977, that sent the rights to Ron Low, the 46th overall pick to the Detroit Red Wings in exchange for Walt McKechnie, the third round pick in 1978 and this pick.
4. The Washington Capitals' second round pick went to the New York Islanders as the result of a trade on October 19, 1978, that sent Michel Bergeron to the Washington Capitals in exchange for this pick.
5. The Minnesota North Stars' second round pick went to the Montreal Canadiens as the result of a trade on August 9, 1979 that sent Bill Nyrop to the Minnesota North Stars in exchange for the second round pick in 1980 (changed to the second round pick in 1982 on June 11, 1980) and this pick.
6. The Toronto Maple Leafs' second round pick went to the Los Angeles Kings as the result of a trade on June 14, 1978, that sent Dave Hutchison and Lorne Stamler to the Toronto Maple Leafs in exchange for Brian Glennie, Kurt Walker, Scott Garland and this pick.
7. The Edmonton Oilers' second round pick went to the Minnesota North Stars as the result of a trade on August 9, 1979, that sent Dave Semenko and the 48th overall pick to the Edmonton Oilers in exchange for the 63rd overall pick and this pick.

=== Round three ===
#	Player	Nationality	NHL team	College/junior/club team
43	Craig Levie (D)	Canada	Montreal Canadiens (from Colorado)	Edmonton Oil Kings (WHL)
44	Guy Carbonneau (C)	Canada	Montreal Canadiens (from St. Louis)	Chicoutimi Sagueneens (QMJHL)
45	Jody Gage (RW)	Canada	Detroit Red Wings	Kitchener Rangers (OMJHL)
46	Boris Fistric (D)	Canada	Detroit Red Wings (from Washington)	New Westminster Bruins (WHL)
47	Ken Ellacott (G)	Canada	Vancouver Canucks	Peterborough Petes (OMJHL)
48	Mark Messier (LW)	Canada	Edmonton Oilers (from Minnesota)	Cincinnati Stingers (WHA)
49	Bill Gardner (C)	Canada	Chicago Blackhawks	Peterborough Petes (OMJHL)
50	John-Paul Kelly (LW)	Canada	Los Angeles Kings	New Westminster Bruins (WHL)
51	Normand Aubin (C)	Canada	Toronto Maple Leafs	Verdun Eperviers (QMJHL)
52	Bennett Wolf (D)	Canada	Pittsburgh Penguins	Kitchener Rangers (OMJHL)
53	Mark Robinson (D)	Canada	Buffalo Sabres	Victoria Cougars (WHL)
54	Tim Hunter (D)	Canada	Atlanta Flames	Seattle Breakers (WHL)
55	Jacques Cloutier (G)	Canada	Buffalo Sabres (from New York Rangers)	Trois-Rivieres Draveurs (QMJHL)
56	Lindsay Carson (LW)	Canada	Philadelphia Flyers	Billings Bighorns (WHL)
57	Keith Crowder (RW)	Canada	Boston Bruins	Peterborough Petes (OMJHL)
58	Rick Wamsley (G)	Canada	Montreal Canadiens	Brantford Alexanders (OMJHL)
59	Roland Melanson (G)	Canada	New York Islanders	Windsor Spitfires (OMJHL)
60	Don Nachbaur (C)	Canada	Hartford Whalers	Billings Bighorns (WHL)
61	Bill Whelton (D)	United States	Winnipeg Jets	Boston University (ECAC)
62	Lee Norwood (D)	United States	Quebec Nordiques	Oshawa Generals (OMJHL)
63	Kevin Maxwell (C)	Canada	Minnesota North Stars (from Edmonton)	University of North Dakota (WCHA)
^{Reference: "1979 NHL Entry Draft hockeydraftcentral.com". Archived from the original on February 20, 2009.}

Notes

1. The Colorado Rockies' third round pick went to the Montreal Canadiens as the result of a trade on November 24, 1976, that sent John Van Boxmeer to the Colorado Rockies in exchange for this pick.
2. The St. Louis Blues' third round pick went to the Montreal Canadiens as the result of a trade on August 18, 1977, that sent Jim Roberts to the St. Louis Blues in exchange for this pick.
3. The Washington Capitals' third round pick went to the Detroit Red Wings as the result of a trade on August 17, 1977, that sent Walt McKechnie, the third round pick in 1978 and the 24th overall pick to the Washington Capitals in exchange for the rights to Ron Low and this pick.
4. The Minnesota North Stars' third round pick went to the Edmonton Oilers as the result of a trade on August 9, 1979, that sent the 42nd overall pick and the 63rd overall pick to the Edmonton Oilers in exchange for Dave Semenko and this pick.
5. The New York Rangers' third round pick went to the Buffalo Sabres as the result of a trade on March 12, 1979, that sent Jocelyn Guevremont to the New York Rangers in exchange for the third round pick in 1980 and this pick.
6. The Edmonton Oilers' third round pick went to the Minnesota North Stars as the result of a trade on August 9, 1979, that sent Dave Semenko and the 48th overall pick to the Edmonton Oilers in exchange for the 42nd overall pick and this pick.

=== Round four ===
#	Player	Nationality	NHL team	College/junior/club team
64	Steve Peters (C)	Canada	Colorado Rockies	Oshawa Generals (OMJHL)
65	Bob Crawford (RW)	Canada	St. Louis Blues	Cornwall Royals (QMJHL)
66	John Ogrodnick (RW)	Canada	Detroit Red Wings	New Westminster Bruins (WHL)
67	Harvie Pocza (LW)	Canada	Washington Capitals	Billings Bighorns (WHL)
68	Arthur Rutland (C)	Canada	Vancouver Canucks	Sault Ste. Marie Greyhounds (OMJHL)
69	Glenn Anderson (RW)	Canada	Edmonton Oilers (from Minnesota)	University of Denver (WCHA)
70	Louis Begin (LW)	Canada	Chicago Blackhawks	Sherbrooke Castors (QMJHL)
71	John Gibson (D)	Canada	Los Angeles Kings	Niagara Falls Flyers (OMJHL)
72	Vincent Tremblay (G)	Canada	Toronto Maple Leafs	Quebec Remparts (QMJHL)
73	Brian Cross (D)	Canada	Pittsburgh Penguins	Brantford Alexanders (OMJHL)
74	Gilles Hamel (LW)	Canada	Buffalo Sabres	Laval National (QMJHL)
75	Jim Peplinski (RW)	Canada	Atlanta Flames	Toronto Marlboros (OMJHL)
76	Pat Conacher (C)	Canada	New York Rangers	Saskatoon Blades (WHL)
77	Don Gillen (RW)	Canada	Philadelphia Flyers	Brandon Wheat Kings (WHL)
78	Larry Melnyk (D)	Canada	Boston Bruins	New Westminster Bruins (WHL)
79	Dave Orleski (LW)	Canada	Montreal Canadiens	New Westminster Bruins (WHL)
80	Tim Lockridge (D)	Canada	New York Islanders	Brandon Wheat Kings (WHL)
81	Ray Neufeld (RW)	Canada	Hartford Whalers	Edmonton Oil Kings (WHL)
82	Pat Daley (LW)	Canada	Winnipeg Jets	Montreal Juniors (QMJHL)
83	Anton Stastny (LW)	Czechoslovakia	Quebec Nordiques	Slovan Bratislava (Czechoslovakia)
84	Maxwell Kostovich (LW)	Canada	Edmonton Oilers	Portland Winter Hawks (WHL)
^{Reference: "1979 NHL Entry Draft hockeydraftcentral.com". Archived from the original on February 20, 2009.}

Notes

1. The Minnesota North Stars' fourth round pick went to the Edmonton Oilers as the result of a trade on June 9, 1979, that the Edmonton Oilers promised to not make Paul Shmyr one of its priority selections in the 1979 NHL expansion draft in exchange for this pick.

=== Round five ===
#	Player	Nationality	NHL team	College/junior/club team
85	Gary Dillon (C)	Canada	Colorado Rockies	Toronto Marlboros (OMJHL)
86	Mark Reeds (RW)	Canada	St. Louis Blues	Peterborough Petes (OMJHL)
87	Joe Paterson (LW)	Canada	Detroit Red Wings	London Knights (OMJHL)
88	Tim Tookey (C)	Canada	Washington Capitals	Portland Winter Hawks (WHL)
89	Dirk Graham (RW)	Canada	Vancouver Canucks	Regina Pats (WHL)
90	Jim Dobson (RW)	Canada	Minnesota North Stars	Portland Winter Hawks (WHL)
91	Lowell Loveday (D)	Canada	Chicago Blackhawks	Kingston Canadians (OMJHL)
92	Jim Brown (D)	United States	Los Angeles Kings	University of Notre Dame (WCHA)
93	Frank Nigro (C)	Canada	Toronto Maple Leafs	London Knights (OMJHL)
94	Nick Ricci (G)	Canada	Pittsburgh Penguins	Niagara Falls Flyers (OMJHL)
95	Alan Haworth (C)	Canada	Buffalo Sabres	Sherbrooke Castors (QMJHL)
96	Brad Kempthorne (C)	Canada	Atlanta Flames	Brandon Wheat Kings (WHL)
97	Dan Makuch (RW)	Canada	New York Rangers	Clarkson University (ECAC)
98	Thomas Eriksson (D)	Sweden	Philadelphia Flyers	Djurgardens IF (Sweden)
99	Marco Baron (G)	Canada	Boston Bruins	Montreal Juniors (QMJHL)
100	Yvan Joly (RW)	Canada	Montreal Canadiens	Ottawa 67's (OMJHL)
101	Glen Duncan (LW)	Canada	New York Islanders	Toronto Marlboros (OMJHL)
102	Mark Renaud (D)	Canada	Hartford Whalers	Niagara Falls Flyers (OMJHL)
103	Thomas Steen (C)	Sweden	Winnipeg Jets	Leksands IF (Sweden)
104	Pierre Lacroix (D)	Canada	Quebec Nordiques	Trois-Rivieres Draveurs (QMJHL)
105	Mike Toal (C)	Canada	Edmonton Oilers	Portland Winter Hawks (WHL)
^{Reference: "1979 NHL Entry Draft hockeydraftcentral.com". Archived from the original on February 20, 2009.}

=== Round six ===
#	Player	Nationality	NHL team	College/junior/club team
106	Bob Attwell (RW)	Canada	Colorado Rockies	Peterborough Petes (OMJHL)
107	Gilles Leduc (LW)	Canada	St. Louis Blues	Verdun Eperviers (QMJHL)
108	Carmine Cirella (LW)	Canada	Detroit Red Wings	Peterborough Petes (OMJHL)
109	Greg Theberge (D)	Canada	Washington Capitals	Peterborough Petes (OMJHL)
110	Shane Swan (D)	Canada	Vancouver Canucks	Sudbury Wolves (OMJHL)
111	Brian Gualazzi (RW)	Canada	Minnesota North Stars	Sault Ste. Marie Greyhounds (OMJHL)
112	Doug Crossman (D)	Canada	Chicago Blackhawks	Ottawa 67's (OMJHL)
113	Jay McFarlane (D)	Canada	Los Angeles Kings	University of Wisconsin (WCHA)
114	Bill McCreary (RW)	United States	Toronto Maple Leafs	Colgate University (ECAC)
115	Marc Chorney (D)	Canada	Pittsburgh Penguins	University of North Dakota (WCHA)
116	Rick Knickle (G)	Canada	Buffalo Sabres	Brandon Wheat Kings (WHL)
117	Glenn Johnson (C)	Canada	Atlanta Flames	University of Denver (WCHA)
118	Stan Adams (C)	Canada	New York Rangers	Niagara Falls Flyers (OMJHL)
119	Gord Williams (RW)	Canada	Philadelphia Flyers	Lethbridge Broncos (WHL)
120	Mike Krushelnyski (C)	Canada	Boston Bruins	Montreal Juniors (QMJHL)
121	Greg Moffett (G)	United States	Montreal Canadiens	University of New Hampshire (ECAC)
122	John Gibb (D)	Canada	New York Islanders	Bowling Green University (CCHA)
123	Dave McDonald (LW)	Canada	Hartford Whalers	Brandon Wheat Kings (WHL)
124	Tim Watters (D)	Canada	Winnipeg Jets	Michigan Technological University (WCHA)
125	Scott McGeown (D)	Canada	Quebec Nordiques	Toronto Marlboros (OMJHL)
126	Blair Barnes (RW)	Canada	Edmonton Oilers	Windsor Spitfires (OMJHL)
^{Reference: "1979 NHL Entry Draft hockeydraftcentral.com". Archived from the original on February 20, 2009.}

= NHL All-Star team ·	= NHL All-Star ·	= NHL All-Star and NHL All-Star team ·	= Hall of Famers

== Draftees based on nationality ==
Rank	Country	Amount
	North America	120
1	Canada	111
2	United States	9
	Europe	6
3	Sweden	5
4	Czechoslovakia	1

== See also ==
- 1978–79 NHL season
- 1979 NHL expansion draft
- List of NHL players
