= Anssi Melametsä =

Finnish ice hockey player

- Born: June 21, 1961 (age 64); Jyväskylä, Finland
- Height: 6 ft 0 in (183 cm)
- Weight: 194 lb (88 kg; 13 st 12 lb)
- Position: Center
- Shot: Left
- Played for: Winnipeg Jets; Jokerit; HIFK
- National team: Finland
- NHL draft: 249th overall, 1985; Winnipeg Jets
- Playing career: 1979–1994

Anssi Ilari Melametsä (born June 21, 1961) is a Finnish former professional ice hockey player who played in the National Hockey League and SM-liiga. He played for Jokerit, where he was captain, as well as HIFK, and the Winnipeg Jets. Internationally he represented Finland at several World Championships and at the 1984 Winter Olympics.

== Career statistics ==
=== Regular season and playoffs ===
			Regular season					Playoffs
Season	Team	League	GP	G	A	Pts	PIM	GP	G	A	Pts	PIM
1977–78	Jokerit	FIN U20	20	14	2	16	8	—	—	—	—	—
1978–79	Peterborough Petes	OMJHL	64	9	21	30	27	—	—	—	—	—
1979–80	Jokerit	SM-l	36	6	13	19	55	—	—	—	—	—
1980–81	Jokerit	SM-l	36	14	22	36	46	—	—	—	—	—
1981–82	HIFK	SM-l	28	17	12	29	30	8	2	6	8	8
1982–83	HIFK	FIN	36	13	20	33	49	9	2	6	8	6
1983–84	HIFK	SM-l	37	16	17	33	44	2	0	0	0	0
1984–85	HIFK	SM-l	36	16	15	31	18	—	—	—	—	—
1985–86	Sherbrooke Canadiens	AHL	14	7	5	12	6	—	—	—	—	—
1985–86	Winnipeg Jets	NHL	27	0	3	3	2	—	—	—	—	—
1986–87	HIFK	SM-l	35	13	12	25	44	4	0	0	0	6
1987–88	HIFK	SM-l	41	8	8	16	40	6	2	0	2	12
1988–89	Jokerit	FIN-2	42	26	40	66	44	—	—	—	—	—
1989–90	Jokerit	SM-l	44	24	27	51	28	—	—	—	—	—
1990–91	Jokerit	SM-l	44	10	21	31	20	—	—	—	—	—
1991–92	Team Boro	SWE-2	31	5	23	28	16	—	—	—	—	—
1992–93	KooKoo	FIN-2	43	20	31	51	44	—	—	—	—	—
1993–94	KooKoo	FIN-2	43	16	24	40	18	—	—	—	—	—
SM-l totals			373	137	167	304	374	29	6	12	18	32
NHL totals			27	0	3	3	2	—	—	—	—	—

=== International ===
Year	Team	Event	GP	G	A	Pts	PIM
1980	Finland	WJC	5	0	4	4	4
1981	Finland	WJC	5	1	3	4	2
1983	Finland	WC	10	6	3	9	20
1984	Finland	OG	6	4	3	7	10
1985	Finland	WC	10	2	2	4	10
Junior totals			10	1	7	8	6
Senior totals			26	12	8	20	40
