= Jacques Cloutier =

Canadian ice hockey player (born 1960)

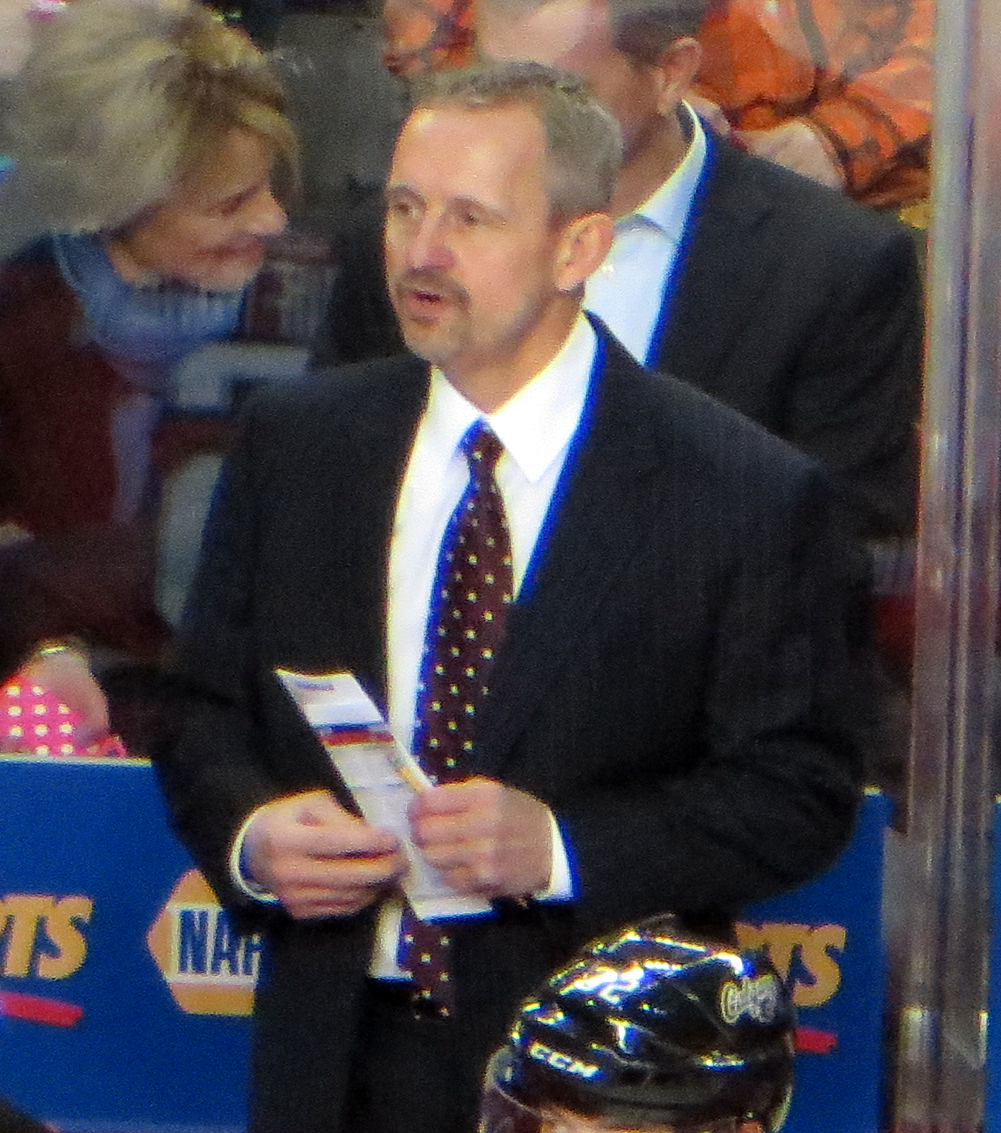
- Cloutier in 2014
- Born: January 3, 1960 (age 66) Noranda, Quebec, Canada
- Height: 5 ft 7 in (170 cm)
- Weight: 155 lb (70 kg; 11 st 1 lb)
- Position: Goaltender
- Caught: Left
- Played for: Buffalo Sabres; Chicago Blackhawks; Quebec Nordiques
- National team: Canada
- NHL draft: 55th overall, 1979; Buffalo Sabres
- Playing career: 1980–1994

Jacques Cloutier (born January 3, 1960) is a Canadian former professional ice hockey goaltender who competed in the NHL from 1981 to 1994, playing for the Buffalo Sabres, Chicago Blackhawks, and Quebec Nordiques. He previously served as an assistant coach under Bob Hartley with the Colorado Avalanche, Calgary Flames and Avangard Omsk in the Kontinental Hockey League (KHL). On the international stage, Cloutier represented Canada at the 1986 World Championships, where he helped the team earn a bronze medal.

== Playing and coaching career ==
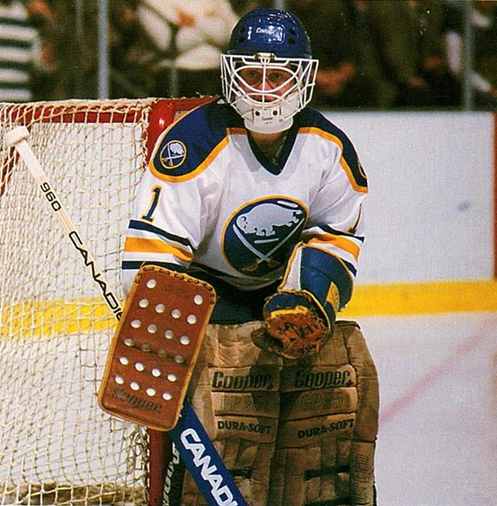
Cloutier behind the net in 1986 photo for Buffalo Sabres

Medal record

Representing Canada

World Championships
Bronze medal – third place	1986 Soviet Union	

Cloutier, drafted by the Buffalo Sabres in the 1979 NHL entry draft, went on to play for the Chicago Blackhawks and the Quebec Nordiques. After retiring as a player in 1994, he transitioned into coaching, taking on the role of goaltending coach for the Nordiques, a position he continued to hold when the team relocated to Denver and became the Colorado Avalanche. In 1996, he was promoted to assistant coach with Colorado, helping the team capture Stanley Cup titles in both 1996 and 2001. Cloutier's tenure with the Avalanche ended on June 3, 2009. He later joined the Calgary Flames as an assistant coach, a role he held until being dismissed on May 3, 2016.

He took on the role of starting goaltender for the Rochester Americans throughout the 1982–83 season, playing a crucial part in leading the team to victory as they secured the Calder Cup championship. The Rochester Americans were the American Hockey League (AHL) affiliate of the Buffalo Sabres at that time. Recognizing his outstanding contributions and impact on the league, he was later honoured with induction into the American Hockey League Hall of Fame in 2000.

== Career statistics ==
=== Regular season and playoffs ===
			Regular season									Playoffs
Season	Team	League	GP	W	L	T	MIN	GA	SO	GAA	SV%	GP	W	L	MIN	GA	SO	GAA	SV%
1976–77	Trois-Rivieres Draveurs	QMJHL	24	11	7	2	1109	93	0	5.03	.862	—	—	—	—	—	—	—	—
1977–78	Trois-Rivieres Draveurs	QMJHL	71	46	17	7	4134	240	4	3.48	.879	13	12	1	779	40	1	3.08	.878
1977–78	Trois-Rivieres Draveurs	M-Cup	—	—	—	—	—	—	—	—	—	4	1	3	240	18	0	4.50	.874
1978–79	Trois-Rivieres Draveurs	QMJHL	72	58	8	6	4168	218	4	3.14	.877	13	12	1	780	36	0	2.77	.9901
1978–79	Trois-Rivieres Draveurs	M-Cup	—	—	—	—	—	—	—	—	—	4	2	2	240	13	0	3.25	.914
1979–80	Trois-Rivieres Draveurs	QMJHL	55	27	20	7	3222	231	2	4.30	.869	7	3	4	420	33	0	4.71	.850
1980–81	Rochester Americans	AHL	61	27	27	6	3478	209	1	3.61	.883	—	—	—	—	—	—	—	—
1981–82	Buffalo Sabres	NHL	7	5	1	0	310	13	0	2.52	.916	—	—	—	—	—	—	—	—
1981–82	Rochester Americans	AHL	23	14	7	2	1366	64	0	2.81	—	—	—	—	—	—	—	—	—
1982–83	Buffalo Sabres	NHL	25	10	7	6	1388	81	0	3.50	.858	—	—	—	—	—	—	—	—
1982–83	Rochester Americans	AHL	13	7	3	1	634	42	0	3.97	.870	16	12	4	992	47	0	2.84	—
1983–84	Rochester Americans	AHL	51	26	22	1	2841	172	1	3.63	—	18	9	9	1145	68	0	3.56	—
1984–85	Buffalo Sabres	NHL	1	0	0	1	65	4	0	3.69	.892	—	—	—	—	—	—	—	—
1984–85	Rochester Americans	AHL	14	10	2	1	803	36	0	2.69	.910	—	—	—	—	—	—	—	—
1985–86	Buffalo Sabres	NHL	15	5	9	1	868	48	1	3.32	.887	—	—	—	—	—	—	—	—
1985–86	Rochester Americans	AHL	14	10	2	2	835	38	1	2.73	.918	—	—	—	—	—	—	—	—
1986–87	Buffalo Sabres	NHL	40	11	19	5	2157	136	0	3.78	.869	—	—	—	—	—	—	—	—
1987–88	Buffalo Sabres	NHL	20	4	8	2	848	67	0	4.75	.850	—	—	—	—	—	—	—	—
1988–89	Buffalo Sabres	NHL	36	15	14	0	1786	108	0	3.63	.874	4	1	3	239	10	1	2.52	.907
1988–89	Rochester Americans	AHL	11	2	7	0	527	41	0	4.67	.847	—	—	—	—	—	—	—	—
1989–90	Chicago Blackhawks	NHL	43	18	15	2	2179	112	2	3.09	.879	4	0	2	176	8	0	2.74	.893
1990–91	Chicago Blackhawks	NHL	10	2	3	0	403	24	0	3.58	.863	—	—	—	—	—	—	—	—
1990–91	Quebec Nordiques	NHL	15	3	8	2	830	61	0	4.41	.884	—	—	—	—	—	—	—	—
1991–92	Quebec Nordiques	NHL	26	6	14	3	1345	88	0	3.93	.876	—	—	—	—	—	—	—	—
1992–93	Quebec Nordiques	NHL	3	0	2	1	155	10	0	3.89	.846	—	—	—	—	—	—	—	—
1993–94	Quebec Nordiques	NHL	14	3	2	1	476	24	0	3.03	.897	—	—	—	—	—	—	—	—
NHL totals			255	82	102	24	12,804	776	3	3.64	.874	8	1	5	414	18	1	2.61	.901

=== International ===
Year	Team	Event	GP	W	L	T	MIN	GA	SO	GAA	SV%
1986	Canada	WC	5	—	—	—	298	15	0	3.02	—
Senior totals			5	—	—	—	298	15	0	3.02	—
