= Blake Wesley (ice hockey) =

Canadian ice hockey player (born 1959)

- Born: July 10, 1959 (age 66) Red Deer, Alberta, Canada
- Height: 6 ft 1 in (185 cm)
- Weight: 200 lb (91 kg; 14 st 4 lb)
- Position: Defence
- Shot: Left
- Played for: Philadelphia Flyers; Hartford Whalers; Quebec Nordiques; Toronto Maple Leafs
- NHL draft: 22nd overall, 1979; Philadelphia Flyers
- Playing career: 1979–1988

Trevor "Blake" Wesley (born July 10, 1959) is a Canadian former professional ice hockey defenceman who played parts of seven seasons in the National Hockey League (NHL) for the Philadelphia Flyers, Hartford Whalers, Quebec Nordiques and Toronto Maple Leafs.

== Career ==
Wesley was born in Red Deer, Alberta. His younger brother Glen also played in the NHL. Wesley's nephew, Josh Wesley, was drafted by the Carolina Hurricanes in the 2014 NHL entry draft.

== Career statistics ==
=== Regular season and playoffs ===
			Regular season					Playoffs
Season	Team	League	GP	G	A	Pts	PIM	GP	G	A	Pts	PIM
1974–75	Red Deer Rustlers	AJHL	3	1	0	1	4	—	—	—	—	—
1975–76	Red Deer Rustlers	AJHL	55	19	41	60	199	—	—	—	—	—
1976–77	Portland Winterhawks	WCHL	63	8	25	33	111	10	0	5	5	32
1977–78	Portland Winterhawks	WCHL	67	7	37	44	190	8	1	3	4	20
1978–79	Portland Winterhawks	WHL	69	10	42	52	292	25	3	8	11	70
1979–80	Maine Mariners	AHL	65	12	22	34	76	12	2	5	7	62
1979–80	Philadelphia Flyers	NHL	2	0	1	1	2	—	—	—	—	—
1980–81	Philadelphia Flyers	NHL	50	3	7	10	107	—	—	—	—	—
1980–81	Maine Mariners	AHL	24	6	10	16	20	9	1	8	9	53
1981–82	Hartford Whalers	NHL	78	9	18	27	123	—	—	—	—	—
1982–83	Hartford Whalers	NHL	22	0	1	1	46	—	—	—	—	—
1982–83	Quebec Nordiques	NHL	52	4	8	12	84	4	0	0	0	2
1983–84	Quebec Nordiques	NHL	46	2	8	10	75	9	1	2	3	20
1984–85	Quebec Nordiques	NHL	21	0	2	2	28	6	1	0	1	8
1984–85	Fredericton Express	AHL	25	3	4	7	80	2	1	0	1	2
1985–86	St. Catharines Saints	AHL	37	3	4	7	56	13	0	3	3	41
1985–86	Toronto Maple Leafs	NHL	27	0	1	1	21	—	—	—	—	—
1986–87	Newmarket Saints	AHL	79	1	12	13	170	—	—	—	—	—
1987–88	Maine Mariners	AHL	34	0	3	3	124	1	0	0	0	2
AHL totals			264	25	55	80	526	37	4	16	20	160
NHL totals			298	18	46	64	486	19	2	2	4	30

== Awards ==
- WHL Second All-Star Team – 1979
