= Keith Crowder =

Canadian ice hockey player

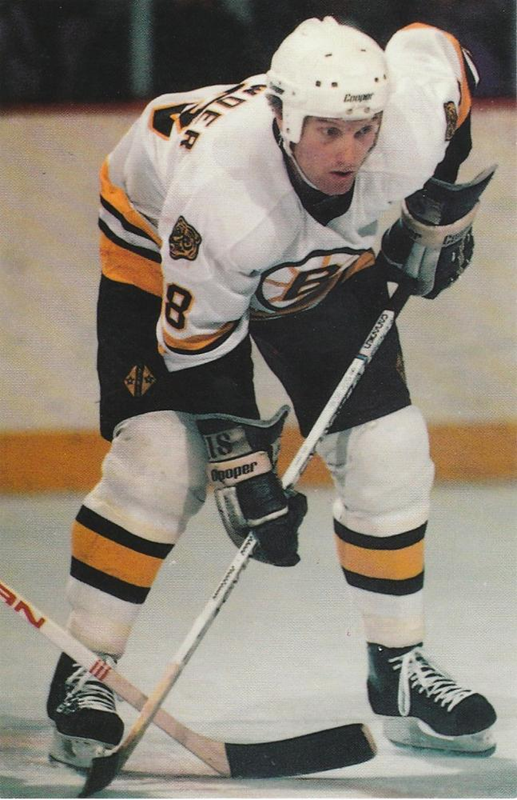
- Born: January 6, 1959 (age 67) Windsor, Ontario, Canada
- Height: 6 ft 0 in (183 cm)
- Weight: 195 lb (88 kg; 13 st 13 lb)
- Position: Right wing
- Shot: Right
- Played for: Birmingham Bulls; Boston Bruins; Los Angeles Kings
- NHL draft: 57th overall, 1979; Boston Bruins
- Playing career: 1978–1990

Keith Scott Crowder (born January 6, 1959) is a Canadian former professional ice hockey right winger who played ten seasons in professional hockey. He played seven games in the World Hockey Association before playing in National Hockey League from 1980 to 1990 for the Boston Bruins and the Los Angeles Kings.

== Playing career ==
Crowder was drafted 57th overall by the Boston Bruins in the 1979 NHL entry draft. He played 662 career NHL games, scoring 223 goals and 271 assists for 494 points while adding 1354 penalty minutes. His best offensive season was the 1985–86 season, when he set career highs with 38 goals, 46 assists, 84 points, 177 penalty minutes, and 20 power-play goals.

In 2023 he would be named one of the top 100 Bruins players of all time.

== Personal life ==
Keith has a large family including his younger brother Craig, who played at Sault College from 1986 to 1988 and an older brother Bruce Crowder who also played in the NHL.

== Career statistics ==
			Regular season					Playoffs
Season	Team	League	GP	G	A	Pts	PIM	GP	G	A	Pts	PIM
1976–77	Peterborough Petes	OMJHL	58	13	19	32	99	—	—	—	—	—
1977–78	Peterborough Petes	OMJHL	58	30	30	60	139	—	—	—	—	—
1978–79	Peterborough Petes	OMJHL	43	25	41	66	76	—	—	—	—	—
1978–79	Birmingham Bulls	WHA	5	1	0	1	17	—	—	—	—	—
1979–80	Grand Rapids Owls	IHL	20	10	13	23	22	—	—	—	—	—
1979–80	Binghamton Dusters	AHL	13	4	0	4	15	—	—	—	—	—
1980–81	Springfield Indians	AHL	26	12	18	30	34	—	—	—	—	—
1980–81	Boston Bruins	NHL	47	13	12	25	172	3	2	0	2	9
1981–82	Boston Bruins	NHL	71	23	21	44	101	11	2	2	4	14
1982–83	Boston Bruins	NHL	74	35	39	74	105	17	1	6	7	52
1983–84	Boston Bruins	NHL	63	24	28	52	128	3	0	0	0	2
1984–85	Boston Bruins	NHL	79	32	38	70	142	4	3	2	5	19
1985–86	Boston Bruins	NHL	78	38	46	84	177	3	2	0	2	21
1986–87	Boston Bruins	NHL	58	22	30	52	106	4	0	1	1	4
1987–88	Boston Bruins	NHL	68	17	26	43	173	23	3	9	12	44
1988–89	Boston Bruins	NHL	69	15	18	33	147	10	0	2	2	37
1989–90	Los Angeles Kings	NHL	55	4	13	17	93	7	1	0	1	9
WHA totals			5	1	0	1	17	—	—	—	—	—
NHL totals			662	223	271	494	1,344	85	14	22	36	211
