= Michel Bergeron (ice hockey, born 1954) =

Canadian ice hockey player

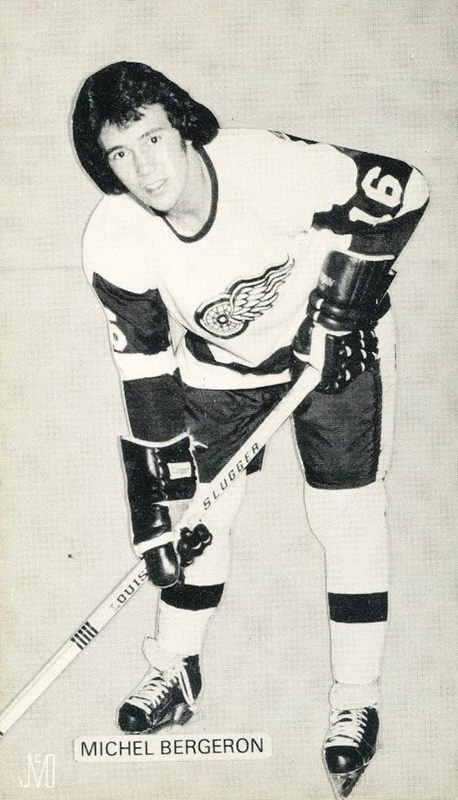
- Born: November 11, 1954 (age 71) Chicoutimi, Quebec, Canada
- Height: 5 ft 10 in (178 cm)
- Weight: 170 lb (77 kg; 12 st 2 lb)
- Position: Right wing
- Shot: Right
- Played for: Detroit Red Wings; New York Islanders; Washington Capitals
- NHL draft: 63rd overall, 1974; Detroit Red Wings
- WHA draft: 83rd overall, 1974; Quebec Nordiques
- Playing career: 1974–1982

Michel Bergeron (born November 11, 1954) is a Canadian retired ice hockey right winger. He played in the National Hockey League with the Detroit Red Wings, New York Islanders, and Washington Capitals between 1975 and 1979.

== Early life ==
As a youth, he played in the 1966 Quebec International Pee-Wee Hockey Tournament with a minor ice hockey team from Chicoutimi.

== Career ==
Drafted in 1974 by both the Detroit Red Wings of the National Hockey League and the Quebec Nordiques of the World Hockey Association, Bergeron also played for the New York Islanders and Washington Capitals.

== Career statistics ==
=== Regular season and playoffs ===
			Regular season					Playoffs
Season	Team	League	GP	G	A	Pts	PIM	GP	G	A	Pts	PIM
1971–72	Sorel Eperviers	QMJHL	24	23	21	44	11	4	0	1	1	29
1972–73	Sorel Eperviers	QMJHL	63	40	62	102	54	9	5	12	17	22
1973–74	Sorel Eperviers	QMJHL	70	62	81	143	120	14	12	14	26	32
1974–75	Detroit Red Wings	NHL	25	10	7	17	10	—	—	—	—	—
1974–75	Virginia Wings	AHL	49	9	13	22	14	—	—	—	—	—
1975–76	Detroit Red Wings	NHL	72	32	27	59	48	—	—	—	—	—
1976–77	Detroit Red Wings	NHL	74	21	12	33	98	—	—	—	—	—
1976–77	Kansas City Blues	CHL	4	3	5	8	4	—	—	—	—	—
1977–78	Detroit Red Wings	NHL	3	1	0	1	0	—	—	—	—	—
1977–78	New York Islanders	NHL	25	9	6	15	2	—	—	—	—	—
1977–78	Fort Worth Texans	CHL	9	2	1	3	4	—	—	—	—	—
1978–79	Washington Capitals	NHL	30	7	6	13	7	—	—	—	—	—
1978–79	Milwaukee Admirals	IHL	15	3	5	8	2	8	7	4	11	2
1979–80	Nova Scotia Voyageurs	AHL	33	11	20	31	30	—	—	—	—	—
1979–80	Milwaukee Admirals	IHL	34	25	37	62	34	2	0	1	1	20
1980–81	Milwaukee Admirals	IHL	71	30	49	79	22	7	2	4	6	11
1981–82	Milwaukee Admirals	IHL	22	8	15	23	4	—	—	—	—	—
1981–82	Kalamazoo Wings	IHL	22	5	9	14	13	—	—	—	—	—
NHL totals			229	80	58	138	165	—	—	—	—	—
