= Scott Garland (ice hockey) =

Canadian ice hockey player

- Born: May 16, 1952; Regina, Saskatchewan, Canada
- Died: June 9, 1979 (aged 27); Montreal, Quebec, Canada
- Height: 6 ft 1 in (185 cm)
- Weight: 185 lb (84 kg; 13 st 3 lb)
- Position: Centre
- Shot: Right
- Played for: Toronto Maple Leafs; Los Angeles Kings
- NHL draft: Undrafted
- Playing career: 1972–1979

Scott Stephen Garland (May 16, 1952 – June 9, 1979) was a Canadian ice hockey centre who played three seasons in the National Hockey League for the Toronto Maple Leafs and Los Angeles Kings between 1976 and 1978.

Garland played 91 career NHL games, scoring 13 goals and 24 assists for 37 points. Garland died of injuries suffered in an automobile accident on June 9, 1979, after blowing a tire driving in Montreal, Quebec, and hitting a wall.

== Career statistics ==
=== Regular season and playoffs ===
			Regular season					Playoffs
Season	Team	League	GP	G	A	Pts	PIM	GP	G	A	Pts	PIM
1970–71	Montreal Junior Canadiens	OHA	29	4	8	12	94	—	—	—	—	—
1971–72	Sarnia Bees	SOJHL	34	9	14	23	159	—	—	—	—	—
1971–72	Peterborough Petes	OHA	5	1	0	1	7	—	—	—	—	—
1972–73	Tulsa Oilers	CHL	62	15	20	35	192	—	—	—	—	—
1973–74	Oklahoma City Blazers	CHL	51	11	10	21	106	9	0	1	1	14
1974–75	Oklahoma City Blazers	CHL	61	18	27	45	132	5	0	2	2	42
1975–76	Toronto Maple Leafs	NHL	16	4	3	7	8	7	1	2	3	35
1975–76	Oklahoma City Blazers	CHL	58	19	40	59	53	—	—	—	—	—
1976–77	Toronto Maple Leafs	NHL	69	9	20	29	83	—	—	—	—	—
1977–78	Tulsa Oilers	CHL	20	6	7	13	19	7	2	0	2	31
1978–79	Los Angeles Kings	NHL	6	0	1	1	24	—	—	—	—	—
1978–79	Springfield Indians	AHL	45	11	20	31	114	—	—	—	—	—
CHL totals			252	69	104	173	502	21	2	3	5	87
NHL totals			91	13	24	37	115	7	1	2	3	35

== See also ==
- List of ice hockey players who died during their playing career
