= Peterborough Petes =

Ontario Hockey League team in Peterborough

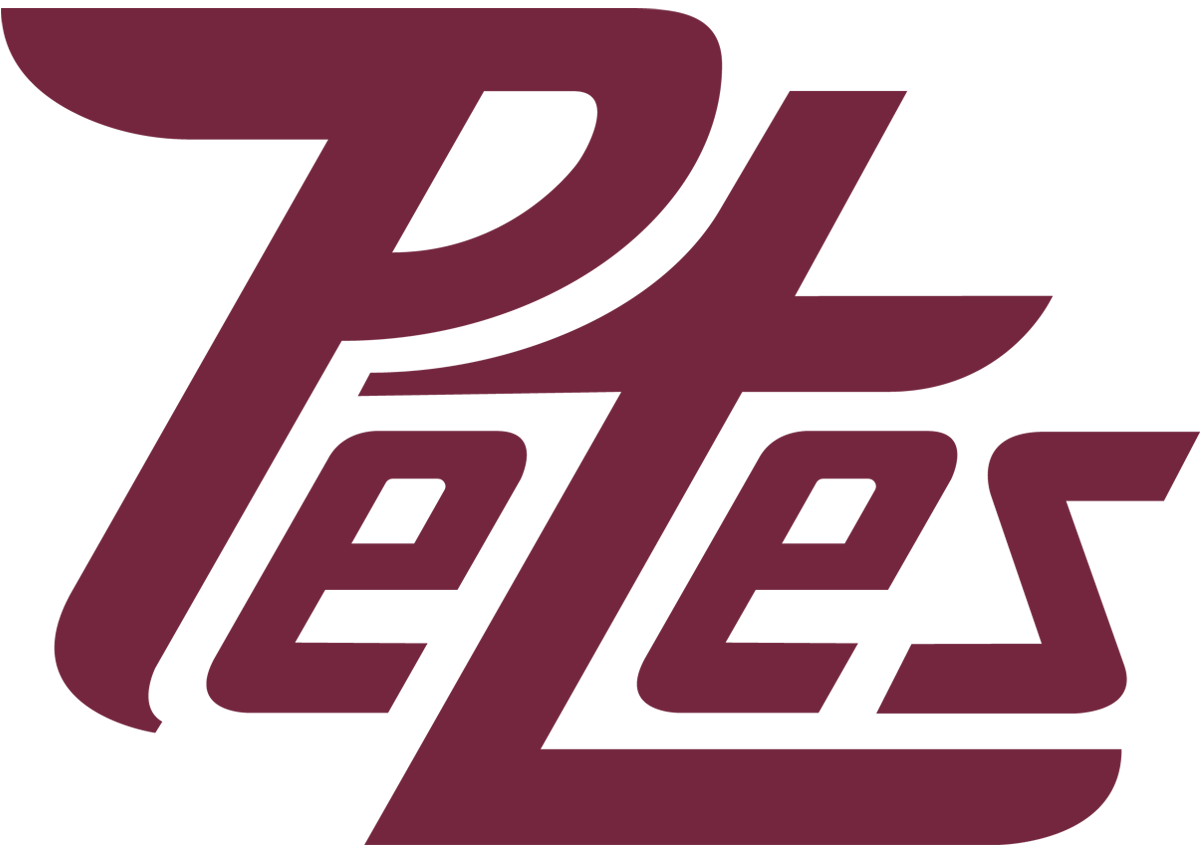
- City: Peterborough, Ontario
- League: Ontario Hockey League
- Conference: Eastern
- Division: East
- Founded: 1956–57
- Home arena: Peterborough Memorial Centre
- Colours: Maroon, black, white
- General manager: Mike Oke
- Head coach: Rob Wilson
- Affiliates: Lindsay Muskies
- Website: www.gopetesgo.com

Franchise history
- 1951–1954: Kitchener Greenshirts
- 1954–1956: Kitchener Canucks
- 1956–present: Peterborough Petes

Championships
- Playoff championships: OHL champions (1959, 1972, 1978, 1979, 1980, 1989, 1993, 1996, 2006, 2023); Memorial Cup champions (1979)

Current uniform

The Peterborough Petes are a junior ice hockey team in the Ontario Hockey League. The team has played at the Peterborough Memorial Centre in Peterborough, Ontario, Canada, since 1956, and is the oldest continuously operating team in the league.

== History ==
The Petes were formed on October 1, 1956, when the Kitchener Canucks relocated to Peterborough after the 1955–56 season. They also became a sponsored junior team for the Montreal Canadiens of the NHL. The Petes played their first game on November 4, 1956, and won their first game on November 8, 1956.

The Petes have won the OHL Championship ten times, which is the second-most in OHL history behind the Oshawa Generals who have 13 and the most in the postwar era. The franchise’s most recent OHL Championship was in 2023 with a six game victory over the London Knights. They won the Memorial Cup once, in 1979.

=== TPT Petes ===
The team was sponsored by Toronto-Peterborough Transport (TPT) from 1956 to 1966. Scotty Bowman was brought in to coach by the Montreal Canadiens organization from the Ottawa-Hull Canadiens junior team, and led the team to a second-place finish in 1959. Peterborough defeated the Barrie Flyers, Guelph Biltmores and Toronto St. Michael's Majors in the playoffs to win their first OHA championship. Bowman and the TPT Petes went on to reach the Memorial Cup for the first time that year but fell to the Winnipeg Braves. The TPT Petes claimed their first Hamilton Spectator Trophy during the 1965-66 season, but were eliminated from the playoffs.

=== Roger Neilson era (1966–1976) ===
The team became known as the Peterborough Petes Hockey Club in 1966–67, which was also the beginning of Roger Neilson's tenure as coach. The Petes wore the TPT logo on their sweaters until 1974–75, when their colours were changed to maroon and white and a new "Petes" logo was adopted.

Neilson led his team to seven consecutive winning seasons from 1968 to 1975, also finishing first overall in 1970–71, winning the J. Ross Robertson Cup in 1972, and were runners-up in 1973 and 1974. In the 1972 Memorial Cup, the Petes lost a close 2–1 game in the finals to the Cornwall Royals.

Neilson left behind a winning legacy in Peterborough and set the standard for coaches to come. Neilson was the first coach to use videotape analysis as a teaching method, leading to the nickname "Captain Video," and also the first to use microphone headsets to communicate with his assistant coaches.

Neilson also pushed the envelope causing several rules to be rewritten. During one Petes game, his team was up one goal, but was down two men in a five on three situation for the last minute of the game. Realizing that more penalties could not be called under the existing rules, Neilson put too many men on the ice every ten seconds. The referees stopped the play and a faceoff was held relieving pressure on the defence. After this display the rule was changed so that a call for too many men on the ice in a 5 on 3 situation now leads to a penalty shot.

Neilson also discovered that if he put a defenceman in net instead of a goalie during a penalty shot, the defenceman could rush the attacker and greatly reduce the chances of a goal. Today the rule states that a team must use a goalie in net for a penalty shot, and that the goalie may not leave the crease until the attacking player touches the puck.

Neilson was promoted for the 1976–77 season, coaching the Dallas Black Hawks in the former Central Hockey League.

=== Three seasons, three titles ===
The Peterborough Petes won three consecutive OHL championships in 1978, 1979 and 1980. Gary Green coached the first two championships followed up by Mike Keenan in 1980. The Petes won the Hamilton Spectator Trophy two consecutive times in 1979 and 1980. Peterborough's success also continued into the Memorial Cup, reaching the championship game all three years, and winning the national junior title in 1979.

Many future NHL stars played for Petes in these three years. Those of note are: Keith Acton, Bob Atwell, Keith Crowder, Ken Ellacott, Doug Evans, Dave Fenyves, Tom Fergus, Larry Floyd, Mark Kirton, Rick LaFerriere, Steve Larmer, Larry Murphy, Mark Reeds, Stuart Smith, Steve Smith, Bill Gardner, Tim Trimper and Jim Wiemer.

=== Dick Todd era (1982–1993) ===
Dick Todd started with the Petes as a trainer in the 1970s and was with the team through their three Memorial Cups. As a coach he led the team to two more Memorial Cup tournaments—in 1989 in Saskatoon, and in 1993 in Sault Ste. Marie. During Todd's time as coach, the Petes won six division titles and had the best overall winning percentage in the OHL. Todd was awarded the Matt Leyden Trophy as OHL Coach of the Year in 1987–88.

=== Memorial Cup 1996 ===
The Peterborough Petes celebrated their 40th anniversary in 1996. The Petes won the J. Ross Robertson Cup defeating the Guelph Storm in the finals, then and also played at home while hosting the Memorial Cup tournament in 1996. The club achieved a 100% sellout each tournament game, and lost in the final that year to the Granby Prédateurs.

=== 50th anniversary ===

Todd returned as head coach of the Petes in 2004. Todd's second season back behind the Petes bench, was the 50th anniversary of the Peterborough Petes founding. They are the oldest continuously operating franchise in the Ontario Hockey League (the rival Oshawa Generals date to 1937 but were inactive from 1953 to 1962).

The Petes celebrated their 50th anniversary in grand style, winning the J. Ross Robertson Cup on May 11, 2006, in a four-game sweep of the London Knights. Peterborough travelled to Moncton, New Brunswick, to play in the 2006 Memorial Cup, losing the third place tiebreaker game to the Vancouver Giants. Todd retired for good a few weeks after the Petes returned from Moncton.

=== 60th anniversary ===
The 2015–16 season marked the 60th in franchise history.

=== Rob Wilson era (2018–present) ===
Under Rob Wilson, the franchise has made three playoff appearances. In 2023, the franchise won its tenth OHL championship and first since 2006, defeating the London Knights, earning its tenth trip to the Memorial Cup.

== Championships ==
Memorial Cup

- 1959 Finalist vs. Winnipeg Braves
- 1972 Finalist vs. Cornwall Royals
- 1978 Finalist vs. New Westminster Bruins
- 1979 Champions vs. Brandon Wheat Kings
- 1980 Finalist vs. Cornwall Royals
- 1989 3rd place in Saskatoon, SK
- 1993 Finalist vs. S.S. Marie Greyhounds
- 1996 Finalist vs. Granby Prédateurs
- 2006 4th Place in Moncton, NB
- 2023 3rd place in Kamloops, BC

George Richardson Memorial Trophy

- 1959 Champions vs. Ottawa-Hull Canadiens

Hamilton Spectator Trophy First overall in the OHL regular season standings.

- 1965–1966 58 points
- 1970–1971 90 points
- 1978–1979 95 points
- 1979–1980 95 points
- 1985–1986 92 points
- 1991–1992 89 points
- 1992–1993 97 points

Bobby Orr Trophy
Eastern Conference Champions.

- 2005 Finalist vs. Ottawa 67's
- 2006 Champions vs. Barrie Colts
- 2017 Finalist vs. Mississauga Steelheads
- 2023 Champions vs. North Bay Battalion

J. Ross Robertson Cup Ontario Hockey League Champions

- 1959 Champions vs. St. Michael's Majors
- 1972 Champions vs. Ottawa 67's
- 1973 Finalist vs. Toronto Marlboros
- 1974 Finalist vs. St. Catharines Black Hawks
- 1978 Champions vs. Hamilton Fincups
- 1979 Champions vs. Niagara Falls Flyers
- 1980 Champions vs. Windsor Spitfires
- 1985 Finalist vs. S.S. Marie Greyhounds
- 1988 Finalist vs. Windsor Compuware Spitfires
- 1989 Champions vs. Niagara Falls Thunder
- 1993 Champions vs. S.S. Marie Greyhounds
- 1996 Champions vs. Guelph Storm
- 2006 Champions vs. London Knights
- 2023 Champions vs. London Knights

Leyden Trophy First overall in the Eastern Division regular season standings.

- 1978–79, 1979–80, 1984–85, 1985–86, 1987–88, 1988–89, 1991–92, 1992–93, 2004–05, 2005–06, 2016–17

== Coaches ==
Three coaches of the Peterborough Petes are members of the Hockey Hall of Fame. Scotty Bowman won nine Stanley Cups in his career, and lead the Petes to the Memorial Cup finals in 1959. Roger Neilson coached 1,000 regular season games in the NHL, and led the Petes to the 1972 Memorial Cup finals. Ted "Teeder" Kennedy played 14 years for the Toronto Maple Leafs.

Gary Green was awarded the Matt Leyden Trophy as OHL Coach of the Year in 1978–79, leading the Petes to their only Memorial Cup championship.

Dick Todd recorded 500 career victories faster than any other coach in Major Junior A hockey history, accomplishing the milestone in just 813 games. Todd was awarded the Matt Leyden Trophy as OHL Coach of the Year in 1987–88.

List of coaches with multiple seasons in parentheses.

- 1956–57 — Calum MacKay
- 1957–58 — Ted Kennedy
- 1958–61 — Scotty Bowman (3)
- 1961–62 — Neil Burke
- 1962–65 — Frank Mario (3)
- 1965–66 — Roger Bedard (2)
- 1966–67 — R. Bedard & R. Neilson
- 1967–76 — Roger Neilson (10)
- 1976–77 — Garry Young
- 1977–79 — Gary Green (2)
- 1979–80 — Mike Keenan
- 1980–81 — Dave Dryden (2)
- 1981–82 — D. Dryden & D. Todd
- 1982–93 — Dick Todd (14)
- 1993–96 — Dave MacQueen (3)
- 1996–97 — Brian Drumm (2)
- 1997–98 — B. Drumm & Jeff Twohey
- 1998–04 — Rick Allain (6)
- 2004–05 — Dick Todd (14)
- 2005–08 — Vince Malette (2)
- 2008–10 — Ken McRae
- 2010–12 — Mike Pelino (2+)
- 2012–18 — Jody Hull (4+)
- 2018 — Andrew Verner (interim)
- 2018–present — Rob Wilson

== Players ==
The Peterborough Petes have 152 alumni who have played in the National Hockey League. Eight Hockey Hall of Fame inductees played junior hockey for the Petes: Bob Gainey, Wayne Gretzky, Larry Murphy, Chris Pronger, Steve Yzerman, and Colin Campbell; and coaches Scotty Bowman and Roger Neilson.

The Petes have not retired any numbers, but they have banners hanging from the ceiling honouring past Petes including Bob Gainey, Steve Yzerman, Mickey Redmond, Larry Murphy, Dick Todd, Roger Neilson, Scotty Bowman, Colin Campbell, and Jamie Langenbrunner.

=== Award winners ===
CHL Player of the Year

- 1989–90 – Mike Ricci

CHL Defenceman of the Year

- 1992–93 – Chris Pronger

CHL Top Draft Prospect Award

- 2005–06 – Jordan Staal

CHL Rookie of the Year

- 2009–10 – Matt Puempel

CHL Sportsman of the Year

- 2019-20 – Nick Robertson

George Parsons Trophy Most Sportsmanlike at the Memorial Cup

- 1978 – Mark Kirton
- 1979 – Chris Halyk
- 1993 – Jason Dawe
- 1994 – Jeff Smith
- 1996 – Mike Williams

Hap Emms Memorial Trophy Outstanding Goaltender at the Memorial Cup

- 1978 – Ken Ellacott
- 1980 – Rick LaFerriere

Stafford Smythe Memorial Trophy Memorial Cup MVP

- 1996 – Cameron Mann

Red Tilson Trophy Most Outstanding Player

- 1959–60 – Wayne Connelly
- 1964–65 – Andre Lacroix
- 1965–66 – Andre Lacroix
- 1966–67 – Mickey Redmond
- 1989–90 – Mike Ricci

Eddie Powers Memorial Trophy Scoring Champion

- 1965–66 – Andre Lacroix

Jim Mahon Memorial Trophy Top scoring right winger

- 1995–96 – Cameron Mann

Max Kaminsky Trophy Most Outstanding Defenceman

- 1969–70 – Ron Plumb
- 1973–74 – Jim Turkiewicz
- 1978–79 – Greg Theberge
- 1979–80 – Larry Murphy
- 1985–86 – Terry Carkner
- 1992–93 – Chris Pronger

Wayne Gretzky 99 Award OHL Playoffs MVP

- 2005–06 – Daniel Ryder
- 2022-23 - Michael Simpson

Emms Family Award Rookie of the Year

- 1989–90 – Chris Longo
- 2009–10 – Matt Puempel

Leo Lalonde Memorial Trophy Overage Player of the Year

- 1996–97 – Zac Bierk

OHL Goaltender of the Year

- 1996–97 – Zac Bierk

Dave Pinkney Trophy Lowest Team GAA

- 1958–59 – Jacques Caron
- 1962–63 – Chuck Goddard
- 1969–70 – John Garrett
- 1970–71 – John Garrett
- 1974–75 – Greg Millen
- 1979–80 – Rick LaFerriere & Terry Wright
- 1985–86 – Kay Whitmore & Ron Tugnutt
- 1987–88 – John Tanner & Todd Bojcun
- 1988–89 – John Tanner & Todd Bojcun
- 1992–93 – Chad Lang & Ryan Douglas

F. W. "Dinty" Moore Trophy Best Rookie GAA

- 1977–78 – Ken Ellacott
- 1981–82 – Shawn Kilroy
- 1984–85 – Ron Tugnutt
- 1987–88 – Todd Bojcun

Dan Snyder Memorial Trophy Humanitarian of the Year

- 1993–94 – Brent Tully
- 1996–97 – Mike Martone
- 2004–05 – Jeff MacDougald
- 2010–11 – Jack Walchessen
- 2011–12 – Andrew D'Agostini

William Hanley Trophy Most Sportsmanlike Player

- 1965–66 – Andre Lacroix
- 1966–67 – Mickey Redmond
- 1974–75 – Doug Jarvis
- 1984–85 – Scott Tottle
- 1989–90 – Mike Ricci
- 2009–10 – Ryan Spooner
- 2019-20 – Nicholas Robertson

Bobby Smith Trophy Scholastic Player of the Year

- 1983–84 – Scott Tottle

Ivan Tennant Memorial Award Top Academic High School Player

- 2010–11 – Andrew D'Agostini

=== NHL alumni ===
The Petes have graduated the most players to the NHL of all current OHL teams with a total of 252.

- Keith Acton
- Brad Aitken
- Jeff Allan
- Bob Attwell
- Scott Barney
- Owen Beck
- Bob Berry
- Zac Bierk
- Zach Bogosian
- Chris Breen
- Gerry Brisson
- Jeff Brubaker
- Randy Burridge
- Cameron Butler
- Don Caley
- Colin Campbell
- Terry Carkner
- Matt Carkner
- Jacques Caron
- Tony Cassolato
- Declan Chisholm
- Wayne Connelly
- Keith Crowder
- Jassen Cullimore
- Paul Curtis
- Jason Dawe
- Denis DeJordy
- Semyon Der-Arguchintsev
- Tie Domi
- Jamie Doornbosch
- Steve Downie
- John Druce
- Dave Duerden
- Dallas Eakins
- Ken Ellacott
- Bob Errey
- Doug Evans
- Kevin Evans
- Paul Evans
- Shawn Evans
- Tony Featherstone
- David Fenyves
- Tom Fergus
- Mark Flood
- Larry Floyd
- Corey Foster
- Kurtis Foster
- Mark Freer
- Bob Gainey
- Bill Gardner
- Scott Garland
- John Garrett
- Doug Gibson
- Dan Gloor
- Danny Grant
- Wayne Gretzky
- Doug Halward
- Chuck Hamilton
- Billy Harris
- Avery Hayes
- Shawn Heins
- Andre Hidi
- Bill Huard
- Jody Hull
- Doug Jarvis
- Matt Johnson
- Joey Johnston
- Randy Johnston
- Stan Jonathan
- Jim Jones
- Jimmy Jones
- Patrick Kaleta
- Zack Kassian
- Pat Kavanagh
- Kris King
- Geordie Kinnear
- Mark Kirton
- Slater Koekkoek
- Evgeny Korolev
- Lukas Krajicek
- Arturs Kulda
- Andre Lacroix
- Rick LaFerriere
- Ron Lalonde
- Jamie Langenbrunner
- Nick Lardis
- Steve Larmer
- Claude Larose
- Don Laurence
- Hank Lehvonen
- Steven Lorentz
- Steve Lyon
- Joey MacDonald
- Kevin MacDonald
- Calum MacKay
- Paul MacKinnon
- Rick MacLeish
- Cameron Mann
- Keith McCreary
- Paul McIntosh
- Scott McLellan
- Dale McTavish
- Mason McTavish
- Mike Meeker
- Anssi Melametsa
- Ryan Merkley
- Jim Mikol
- Greg Millen
- Garry Monahan
- Steve Montador
- Dave Morrison
- Larry Murphy
- Bob Murray
- Rob Murray
- Trevor Murphy
- Bob Neely
- Frank Nigro
- Danny O'Shea
- Brennan Othmann
- Dennis Patterson
- Jim Pavese
- Steve Peters
- Barclay Plager
- Bill Plager
- Ron Plumb
- Mike Posavad
- Chris Pronger
- Matt Puempel
- Alan Quine
- Craig Ramsay
- Jake Rathwell
- Liam Reddox
- Dick Redmond
- Mickey Redmond
- Mark Reeds
- Dave Reid
- Mike Ricci
- Ken Richardson
- Luke Richardson
- Nick Ritchie
- Bob Rivard
- Fern Rivard
- Jim Roberts
- Nicholas Robertson
- Dave Roche
- Peter Scamurra
- John Schella
- Andy Schliebener
- Glen Seabrooke
- Steve Seguin
- Jiri Sekac
- David Shand
- Bruce Shoebottom
- Derrick Smith
- Steve Smith
- Stu Smith
- Irv Spencer
- Ryan Spooner
- Eric Staal
- Jordan Staal
- Ron Stackhouse
- Greg Stewart
- Cory Stillman
- Ken Strong
- Peter Sullivan
- John Tanner
- Jamie Tardif
- Greg Theberge
- Leo Thiffault
- Akil Thomas
- Shawn Thornton
- Tom Thurlby
- Tim Trimper
- Ron Tugnutt
- Rick Vasko
- Mike Veisor
- Austin Watson
- Bryan Watson
- Steve Webb
- Dylan Wells
- Kay Whitmore
- Jim Wiemer
- Jason Williams
- Dunc Wilson
- Keith Wright
- Bryan Young
- Steve Yzerman

== Season-by-season results ==
Regular season and playoffs results:

Legend: GP = Games played, W = Wins, L = Losses, T = Ties, OTL = Overtime losses, SL = Shoot-out losses, Pts = Points, GF = Goals for, GA = Goals against

Memorial Cup champions	OHL champions	OHL finalists

Season	Regular season											Playoffs
Season	GP	W	L	T	OTL	SOL	Pts	Pct	GF	GA	Finish	Playoffs
1956–57	52	11	40	1	—	—	23	0.221	139	239	7th OHA	Did not qualify
1957–58	52	21	25	6	—	—	48	0.462	159	185	5th OHA	Lost quarterfinals (Hamilton Tiger Cubs) 7–3
1958–59	54	29	20	5	—	—	63	0.583	222	179	2nd OHA	Won quarterfinals (Barrie Flyers) 8–4; Won semifinals (Guelph Biltmores) 8–2; Won OHA finals (Toronto St. Michael's Majors) 9–7; Won Eastern Canada playoffs (Ottawa-Hull Canadiens) 4–2–1; Lost 1959 Memorial Cup finals (Winnipeg Braves) 4–1
1959–60	48	22	23	3	—	—	47	0.490	206	205	5th OHA	Won quarterfinals (Barrie Flyers) 8–4; Lost semifinals (St. Catharines Teepees) 9–3
1960–61	48	16	24	8	—	—	40	0.417	167	188	6th OHA	Lost quarterfinals (Hamilton Red Wings) 8–2
1961–62	50	9	33	8	—	—	26	0.260	114	210	6th OHA	Did not qualify
1962–63	50	21	18	11	—	—	53	0.530	144	132	3rd OHA	Lost semifinals (Montreal Junior Canadiens) 9–3
1963–64	56	24	25	7	—	—	55	0.491	176	200	5th OHA	Lost quarterfinals (Montreal Junior Canadiens) 8–2
1964–65	56	28	20	8	—	—	64	0.571	243	197	3rd OHA	Won quarterfinals (St. Catharines Black Hawks) 8–2; Lost semifinals (Toronto Marlboros) 9–7
1965–66	48	24	14	10	—	—	58	0.604	211	171	1st OHA	Lost quarterfinals (Toronto Marlboros) 8–4
1966–67	48	15	23	10	—	—	40	0.417	183	219	8th OHA	Lost quarterfinals (Hamilton Red Wings) 8–4
1967–68	54	13	30	11	—	—	37	0.343	183	243	8th OHA	Lost quarterfinals (Niagara Falls Flyers) 8–2
1968–69	54	27	18	9	—	—	63	0.583	222	193	3rd OHA	Won quarterfinals (London Knights) 8–4; Lost semifinals (Montreal Junior Canadiens) 8–0
1969–70	54	29	13	12	—	—	70	0.648	240	172	2nd OHA	Lost quarterfinals (London Knights) 8–4
1970–71	62	41	13	8	—	—	90	0.726	290	174	1st OHA	Lost quarterfinals (Toronto Marlboros) 8–0
1971–72	63	34	20	9	—	—	77	0.611	292	227	3rd OHA	Won quarterfinals (St. Catharines Black Hawks) 8–2; Won semifinals (Toronto Marlboros) 8–2; Won OHA finals (Ottawa 67's) 8–0; Lost 1972 Memorial Cup final (Cornwall Royals) 2–1
1972–73	63	42	13	8	—	—	92	0.730	330	234	2nd OHA	Won quarterfinals (Oshawa Generals) 8–0; Won semifinals (London Knights) 9–5; Lost OHA finals (Toronto Marlboros) 8–6
1973–74	70	35	21	14	—	—	84	0.600	255	230	3rd OHA	Won quarterfinals (Ottawa 67's) 9–5; Won semifinals (Kitchener Rangers) 8–4; Lost OHA finals (St. Catharines Black Hawks) 9–1
1974–75	70	37	20	13	—	—	87	0.621	311	254	2nd OHA	Won quarterfinals (Oshawa Generals) 8–2; Lost semifinals (Hamilton Fincups) 8–4
1975–76	66	18	37	11	—	—	47	0.356	204	284	6th Leyden	Did not qualify
1976–77	66	31	28	7	—	—	69	0.523	307	309	4th Leyden	Lost preliminary round Sault Ste. Marie Greyhounds 3–1
1977–78	68	37	18	13	—	—	87	0.640	327	273	2nd Leyden	Won quarterfinals (Oshawa Generals) 9–3; Won semifinals (Ottawa 67's) 9–7; Won OMJHL finals (Hamilton Fincups) 8–6; Lost 1978 Memorial Cup final (New Westminster Bruins) 7–4
1978–79	68	46	19	3	—	—	95	0.699	341	245	1st Leyden	Won quarterfinals (Kingston Canadians) 9–5; Won semifinals (Sudbury Wolves) 8–2; Won OMJHL finals (Niagara Falls Flyers) 8–6; Won 1979 Memorial Cup final (Brandon Wheat Kings) 2–1
1979–80	68	47	20	1	—	—	95	0.699	316	238	1st Leyden	Won quarterfinals (Sudbury Wolves) 4–3; Won semifinals (Ottawa 67's) 4–0; Won OMJHL finals (Windsor Spitfires) 4–0; Lost 1980 Memorial Cup final (Cornwall Royals) 3–2
1980–81	68	29	36	3	—	—	61	0.449	287	290	5th Leyden	Lost division quarterfinals (Oshawa Generals) 3–2
1981–82	68	36	29	3	—	—	75	0.551	291	266	3rd Leyden	Won division quarterfinals (Kingston Canadians) 6–2; Lost division semifinals (Oshawa Generals) 8–2
1982–83	70	46	22	2	—	—	94	0.671	367	278	2nd Leyden	Bye through division quarterfinals Lost division semifinals (Oshawa Generals) 8–0
1983–84	70	43	23	4	—	—	90	0.643	380	307	3rd Leyden	Won division quarterfinals (Cornwall Royals) 6–0; Lost division semifinals (Toronto Marlboros) 8–2
1984–85	66	42	20	4	—	—	88	0.667	354	233	1st Leyden	Won division quarterfinals (Ottawa 67's) 9–1; Bye through division semifinals Won division finals (Belleville Bulls) 9–1; Lost OHL finals (Sault Ste. Marie Greyhounds) 9–5
1985–86	66	45	19	2	—	—	92	0.697	298	190	1st Leyden	Won division quarterfinals (Toronto Marlboros) 8–0; Won division semifinal round-robin (Belleville Bulls and Kingston Canadians); Lost division finals (Belleville Bulls) 9–7
1986–87	66	35	24	7	—	—	77	0.583	267	212	2nd Leyden	Bye through division quarterfinals Won division semifinals (Ottawa 67's) 4–2; Lost division finals (Oshawa Generals) 4–2
1987–88	66	44	17	5	—	—	93	0.705	325	212	1st Leyden	Won division quarterfinals (Toronto Marlboros) 4–0; Bye through division semifinals Won division finals (Ottawa 67's) 4–0; Lost OHL finals (Windsor Compuware Spitfires) 4–0
1988–89	66	42	22	2	—	—	86	0.652	302	235	1st Leyden	Won division quarterfinals (Belleville Bulls) 4–1; Bye through division semifinals Won division finals (Cornwall Royals) 4–2; Won OHL finals (Niagara Falls Thunder) 4–2; Lost 1989 Memorial Cup semifinal (Swift Current Broncos) 6–2
1989–90	66	37	23	6	—	—	80	0.606	294	236	3rd Leyden	Won division quarterfinals (Ottawa 67's) 4–0; Won division semifinals (Belleville Bulls) 4–0; Lost division finals (Oshawa Generals) 4–0
1990–91	66	33	26	7	—	—	73	0.553	272	254	5th Leyden	Lost division quarterfinals (North Bay Centennials) 4–0
1991–92	66	41	18	7	—	—	89	0.674	319	256	1st Leyden	Bye through division quarterfinals Won division semifinals (Ottawa 67's) 4–1; Lost division finals (North Bay Centennials) 4–1
1992–93	66	46	15	5	—	—	97	0.735	352	239	1st Leyden	Lost Super Series to host 1993 Memorial Cup (Sault Ste. Marie Greyhounds) 4–0; Bye through division quarterfinals Won division semifinals (Sudbury Wolves) 4–3; Won division finals (Kingston Frontenacs) 4–1; Won OHL finals (Sault Ste. Marie Greyhounds) 4–1; Lost 1993 Memorial Cup final (Sault Ste. Marie Greyhounds) 4–2
1993–94	66	15	41	10	—	—	40	0.303	252	350	7th Leyden	Lost division quarterfinals (Ottawa 67's) 4–3
1994–95	66	26	34	6	—	—	58	0.439	255	286	5th Eastern	Won division quarterfinals (Oshawa Generals) 4–3; Lost quarterfinals (Detroit Junior Red Wings) 4–0
1995–96	66	35	22	9	—	—	79	0.598	289	235	2nd Eastern	Won division quarterfinals (Kingston Frontenacs) 4–1; Won quarterfinals (Sarnia Sting) 4–2; Won semifinals (Detroit Whalers) 4–1; Won OHL finals (Guelph Storm) 4–3; Lost 1996 Memorial Cup final (Granby Prédateurs) 4–0
1996–97	66	39	25	2	—	—	80	0.606	251	238	3rd Eastern	Won division quarterfinals (Kingston Frontenacs) 4–1; Lost quarterfinals (Oshawa Generals) 4–2
1997–98	66	20	36	10	—	—	50	0.379	212	273	5th Eastern	Lost division quarterfinals (Belleville Bulls) 4–0
1998–99	68	40	26	2	—	—	82	0.603	266	213	4th East	Lost conference quarterfinals (Oshawa Generals) 4–1
1999–2000	68	34	26	7	1	—	76	0.551	242	219	4th East	Lost conference quarterfinals (Belleville Bulls) 4–1
2000–01	68	30	28	8	2	—	70	0.500	221	213	3rd East	Lost conference quarterfinals (Toronto St. Michael's Majors) 4–3
2001–02	68	33	22	7	6	—	79	0.537	242	215	3rd East	Lost conference quarterfinals (Ottawa 67's) 4–2
2002–03	68	32	22	11	3	—	78	0.551	222	215	2nd East	Lost conference quarterfinals (Oshawa Generals) 4–3
2003–04	68	22	40	3	3	—	50	0.346	191	244	4th East	Did not qualify
2004–05	68	34	21	9	4	—	81	0.566	238	215	1st East	Won conference quarterfinals (Belleville Bulls) 4–1; Won conference semifinals (Toronto St. Michael's Majors) 4–1; Lost conference finals (Ottawa 67's) 4–0
2005–06	68	47	16	—	2	3	99	0.728	269	199	1st East	Won conference quarterfinals (Ottawa 67's 4–2); Won conference semifinals (Sudbury Wolves) 4–0; Won conference finals (Barrie Colts) 4–1; Won OHL finals (London Knights) 4–0; Lost 2006 Memorial Cup tie-breaker (Vancouver Giants) 6–0
2006–07	68	24	39	—	1	4	53	0.390	198	274	5th East	Did not qualify
2007–08	68	28	36	—	1	3	60	0.441	199	250	4th East	Lost conference quarterfinals (Belleville Bulls) 4–1
2008–09	68	28	37	—	1	2	59	0.434	210	266	3rd East	Lost conference quarterfinals (Brampton Battalion) 4–0
2009–10	68	29	35	—	1	3	62	0.456	231	277	3rd East	Lost conference quarterfinals (Mississauga St. Michael's Majors) 4–0
2010–11	68	20	45	—	1	2	43	0.316	195	298	5th East	Did not qualify
2011–12	68	27	34	—	3	4	61	0.449	219	281	4th East	Did not qualify
2012–13	68	26	35	—	3	4	59	0.434	202	254	4th East	Did not qualify
2013–14	68	32	30	—	0	6	70	0.515	233	269	3rd East	Won conference quarterfinals (Kingston Frontenacs) 4–3; Lost conference semifinals (Oshawa Generals) 4–0
2014–15	68	26	36	—	1	5	58	0.426	203	268	5th East	Lost conference quarterfinals (Oshawa Generals) 4–1
2015–16	68	33	28	—	2	5	73	0.537	240	259	3rd East	Lost conference quarterfinals (North Bay Battalion) 4–3
2016–17	68	42	21	—	2	3	89	0.654	239	221	1st East	Won conference quarterfinals (Niagara IceDogs) 4–0; Won conference semifinals (Kingston Frontenacs) 4–0; Lost conference finals (Mississauga Steelheads) 4–0
2017–18	68	23	39	—	3	3	52	0.382	222	283	5th East	Did not qualify
2018–19	68	33	31	—	2	2	70	0.515	234	256	3rd East	Lost conference quarterfinals (Oshawa Generals) 4–1
2019–20	62	37	21	—	2	2	78	0.629	250	198	2nd East	Playoffs cancelled due to the COVID-19 pandemic
2020–21	Season cancelled due to the COVID-19 pandemic											
2021–22	68	29	33	—	5	1	64	0.471	240	281	5th East	Lost conference quarterfinals (Hamilton Bulldogs) 4–0
2022–23	68	35	29	—	2	2	74	0.544	247	207	2nd East	Won conference quarterfinals (Sudbury Wolves) 4–0; Won conference semifinals (Ottawa 67's) 4–2; Won conference finals (North Bay Battalion) 4–3; Won OHL finals (London Knights) 4–2; Lost 2023 Memorial Cup semifinal (Seattle Thunderbirds) 4–1
2023–24	68	20	40	—	7	1	48	0.353	183	296	5th East	Did not qualify
2024–25	68	18	41	—	4	5	45	0.331	172	277	5th East	Did not qualify
2025–26	68	40	24	—	1	3	84	0.618	235	231	3rd East	Lost conference quarterfinals (North Bay Battalion) 4–2

== Uniforms and logos ==
From 1956 to 1974, the Petes wore the red, white & blue colours of the Montreal Canadiens. In 1974–75, the club changed to the maroon & white colours they wear today. In January 2000, a new '3rd' jersey was introduced, that used the maroon background, with white, black & gold trim.

For the 2005–06 season, the Petes unveiled a 50th anniversary jersey that has a black background with maroon and gold trim. During January in the 2006–07 season, the Petes wore throwback jerseys for the TPT Petes.

== Arena ==
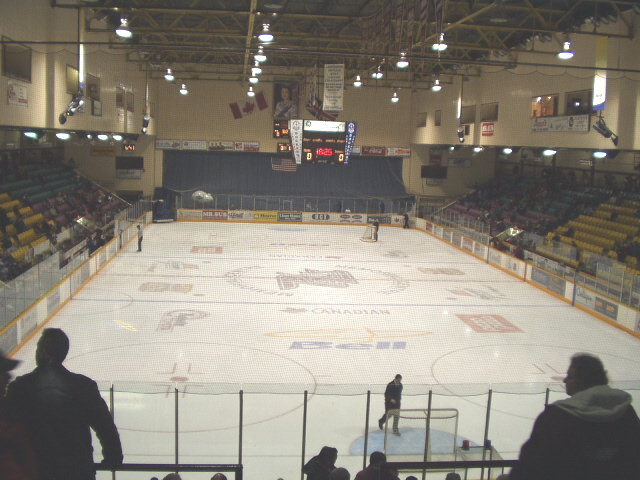
Interior of Peterborough Memorial Centre before renovation

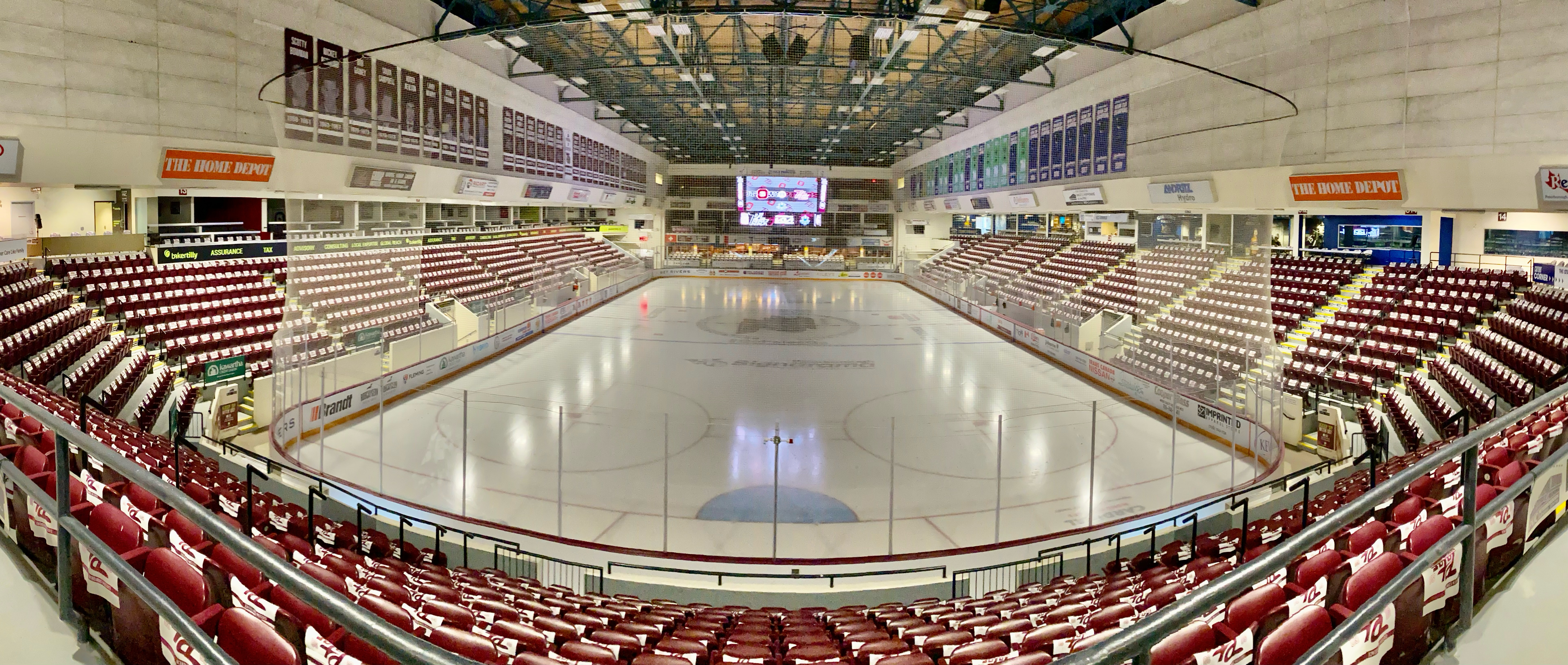
Interior of Peterborough Memorial Centre, April 2023

The Peterborough Memorial Centre was constructed in 1956, and named in honour of the many war veterans who came from the region. It was built at the east of the fairground and horse track at the corner of Landsdowne and George streets.

The original design included a large stage at the south end of the arena, with an oversized portrait of Queen Elizabeth II above. The seats were all wooden and painted yellow, green and mauve. The Memorial Centre hosted the Memorial Cup tournament in 1996. The arena has a capacity of 4,329 for hockey, and an additional 1,000 for concerts.

In 2003, the Memorial Centre was renovated adding 24 luxury box suites, improved concessions, a licensed restaurant, new seats, boards, scoreboard and the addition of air conditioning. The renovated arena hosted the 2004 OHL All-Star Classic.

Canadian Football Hall of Fame inductee John Badham briefly served as the public address announcer for Peterborough Petes home games.

== See also ==
- List of ice hockey teams in Ontario
