= 2018 Memorial Cup =

Canadian junior men's ice hockey championship

Tournament details
- Venue(s): Brandt Centre; Regina, Saskatchewan
- Dates: May 18–27, 2018
- Teams: 4
- Host team: Regina Pats (WHL)
- TV partner(s): Sportsnet, TVA Sports

Final positions
- Champions: Acadie–Bathurst Titan (QMJHL) (1st title)
- Runners-up: Regina Pats (WHL)

Tournament statistics
- Attendance: 49,091
- Scoring leader: Sam Steel (Pats) (13 points)

Awards
- MVP: Sam Steel (Pats)

The 2018 Memorial Cup (branded as the 2018 Mastercard Memorial Cup for sponsorship reasons) was a four-team, round-robin format tournament that was held at Brandt Centre in Regina, Saskatchewan from May 18–27, 2018. It was the 100th Memorial Cup championship of junior ice hockey, and determined the champion of the Canadian Hockey League (CHL). The CHL chose to allow all three of its constituent leagues to bid for hosting the 100th Memorial Cup, instead of the usual rotation between its leagues. The Regina Pats won the right to host the tournament, over bids from the Hamilton Bulldogs and the Oshawa Generals.

The Memorial Cup honours all Canadian military personnel killed in combat, and was founded in the wake of World War I in 1919. The Cup embarked on a tour across Canada for its centennial celebrations, which also included the release of a commemorative coin, and a special postage stamp. The CHL also held a "team of the century" contest for previous Memorial Cup champions, which was won by the 2005 London Knights.

The tournament featured the three champion teams of the CHL's constituent leagues, along with the host team Regina Pats. The Hamilton Bulldogs represented the Ontario Hockey League, and the Swift Current Broncos represented the Western Hockey League. The Acadie–Bathurst Titan from the Quebec Major Junior Hockey League won their first Memorial Cup, defeating the host Regina Pats 3–0 in the championship game. Sam Steel from the Regina Pats was the tournament's top scorer, and named its most valuable player. The 2018 event was the final Memorial Cup sponsored by Mastercard, since Kia Motors became the new title sponsor at the 2019 Memorial Cup.

== Background ==
The Memorial Cup trophy

The Memorial Cup was established by Captain James T. Sutherland in 1919 after he returned from serving in World War I. The deaths of Scotty Davidson, and George Richardson served as inspiration for the trophy. The Cup was donated to the Canadian Amateur Hockey Association by the Ontario Hockey Association (OHA) in March 1919, then known as the "OHA Memorial Cup". It was dedicated in remembrance of Canadian soldiers who died during World War I. The Memorial Cup later became the championship trophy of the Canadian Hockey League (CHL), and in 2010 it was rededicated to honour "all Canadian military personnel killed in combat".

== Host bidding process ==
The CHL chose to allow all three of its constituent leagues to bid for hosting the 100th Memorial Cup. Since 1983 the three leagues had rotated hosting of the event. It would have been the Quebec Major Junior Hockey League's (QMJHL) turn to host in 2018, but an exception was made where the Ontario Hockey League (OHL), and the Western Hockey League (WHL) were also allowed to bid. The regular rotation continued as of the 2019 Memorial Cup, with hosting duties assigned to a team from the QMJHL.

Each league was given a deadline of November 16, 2017, to submit a short list of up to two bids per league for the 2018 event. On January 23, 2018, the CHL announced who would sit on the committee to select the host team. Committee members included Michael Akpata (Canadian Armed Forces retiree), Paul Beeston (former president of the Toronto Blue Jays), Colin Campbell (National Hockey League), Scott Smith (Hockey Canada), Al Coates (Hockey Canada), Serge Fortin (TVA Sports), and Scott Moore (Sportsnet). The three league commissioners, David Branch (OHL), Gilles Courteau (QMJHL), and Ron Robison (WHL), observed on the committee which was chaired by CHL legal counsel Gord Kirke.

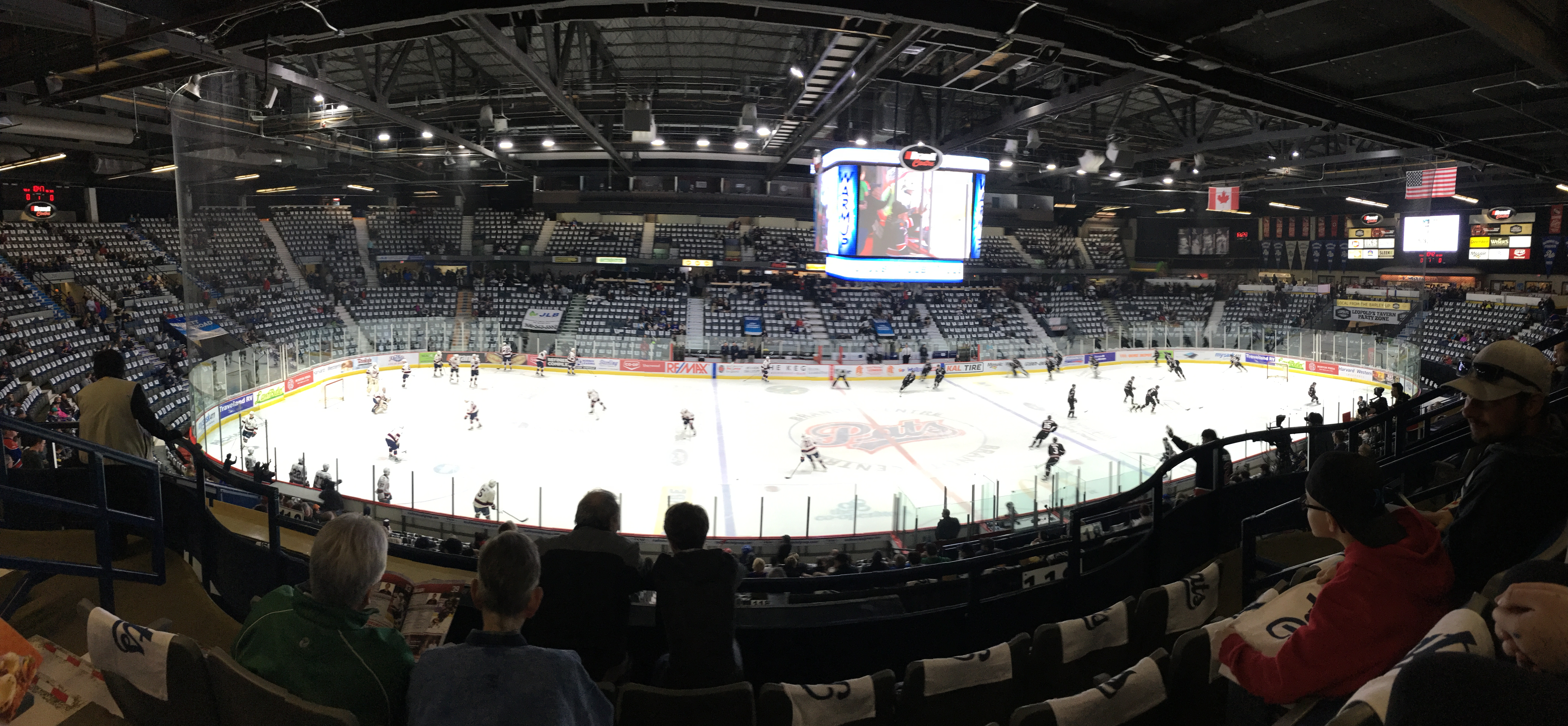
The Brandt Centre, host arena of the 100th Memorial Cup tournament

Formal bids to host event were put forth by the Hamilton Bulldogs, Oshawa Generals, and the Regina Pats. Each team made a bid presentation to the committee on January 25, 2017. Previously, the Kelowna Rockets and the Ottawa 67's had shown interest in bidding for hosting duties, but withdrew before the presentation process.

Hamilton's home arena was FirstOntario Centre with a capacity of 17,383 people, and the host site of the 1990 Memorial Cup. The largest attendance for a Memorial Cup game was the sold out 1990 final at the same arena in Hamilton. The host team in 1990 was the Dukes of Hamilton, but they withdrew from playing in the Cup due to a poor regular season. Oshawa's home arena was General Motors Centre with a capacity of 6,125 people. The Generals previously hosted the 1987 Memorial Cup, and had recently won the 2015 Memorial Cup. Oshawa had won the most Memorial Cup championships for any active CHL team as of 2017, with five titles to their name.

Regina's home arena was Brandt Centre with a capacity of 6,200 people, and host site of the 2001 Memorial Cup. Regina had also co-hosted the 1980 Memorial Cup along with Brandon, Manitoba. The Pats were also the oldest franchise in the CHL, having first played in 1917. The Pats had competed in the most championship games in the Cup's history at 12 times, with victories in 1925, 1930 and 1974. The Pats also played in the very first final, in the 1919 Memorial Cup. On February 18, 2017, the CHL announced the Regina Pats as the host team for the 100th Memorial Cup.

== 100th anniversary celebrations ==
2018 Memorial Cup commemorative coin

The CHL unveiled a 100th anniversary logo for the Memorial Cup on October 12, 2017. It included wheat sheaves symbolic of the Canadian Prairies where Regina is located, and the poppy to honour the fallen soldiers to whom the Memorial Cup is dedicated. The CHL and Canada Post produced a 100th anniversary postage stamp, released on May 18, 2018, which featured two Regina players from the inaugural 1919 Memorial Cup. The CHL also distributed a commemorative coin for the event, in cooperation with the Canadian Imperial Bank of Commerce. The 100th anniversary logo was also worn as a patch by all players and on-ice officials, for the duration of the 2017–18 season commencing on Remembrance Day.

Don Cherry was named an honorary chairman of the 100th anniversary celebrations, and the CHL announced that the Memorial Cup would tour across Canada during the 2017–18 season, beginning on November 18, 2017. The cities included in the tour were, Barrie, Bathurst, Brandon, Calgary, Chicoutimi, Edmonton, Halifax, Kingston, Moncton, Ottawa, Owen Sound, Quebec City, Regina, Sarnia, St. Catharines, Swift Current, and Vancouver. CHL games were broadcast Saturday afternoons on Sportsnet during the season, and the home team of that televised game was allowed promotional use of the Memorial Cup trophy for one week as part of the tour. The Cup's tour began at CFB Borden and the Santa Claus parade in Barrie, and later visited Niagara Falls and Fort George.

The CHL held an online vote to select a "team of the century" from the previous 99 Memorial Cup champions, and posted historical photos, rosters, and tournament summaries for each season. The four top teams were the 1995 Kamloops Blazers, the 2000 Rimouski Océanic, the 2005 London Knights, and the 2013 Halifax Mooseheads. The 2005 London Knights were announced as the "team of the century" during the second period of the final game in the 2018 Memorial Cup.

The 2018 Memorial Cup tournament began on May 17, 2018, with the opening ceremonies hosted by Brent Butt and Adam Growe at Mosaic Stadium. The Snowbirds performed a fly-by of the stadium before the opening concert. Musical acts included a tribute to the Humboldt Broncos bus crash by the Regina Symphony Orchestra, and other performances by Jess Moskaluke, Chad Brownlee, and the Eagles.

== Road to the Cup ==
The Regina Pats were given a berth in the 2018 Memorial Cup in their role as the host team. The remaining three berths were given to the playoffs champions of each constituent league of the CHL.

=== OHL playoffs ===
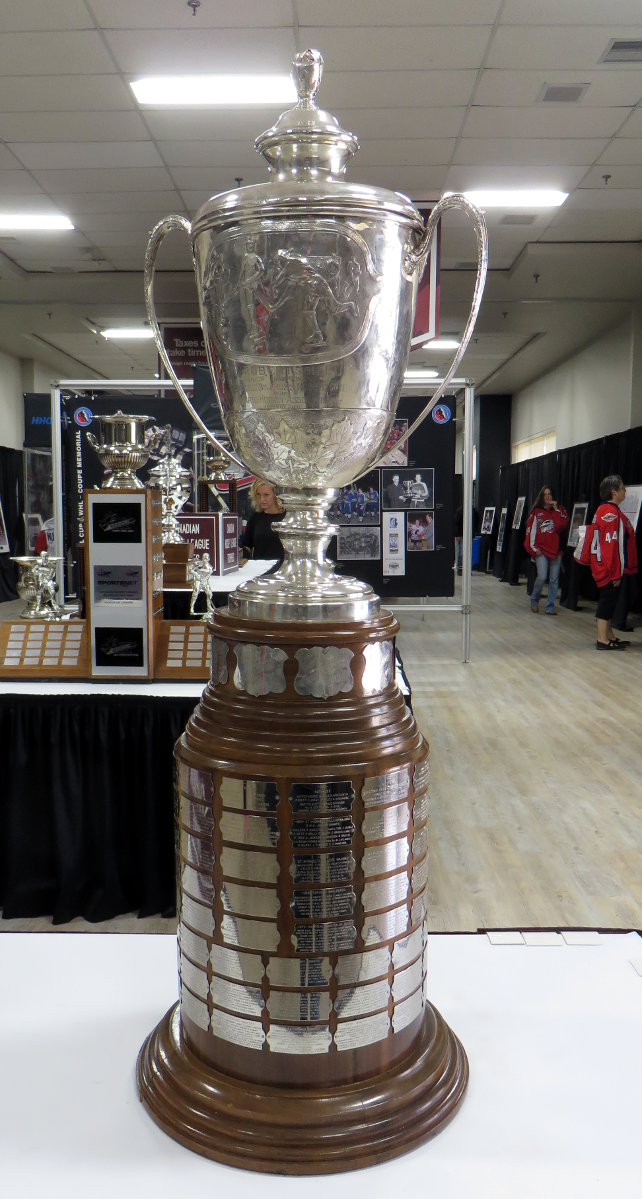
The J. Ross Robertson Cup, championship trophy of the OHL

The Hamilton Bulldogs finished first place in the Eastern conference with 93 points, and the third overall in the league. The team was led in scoring by Matthew Strome with 37 goals, and Brandon Saigeon with 70 points. In the playoffs, the Bulldogs defeated the Ottawa 67's in five games in round one, then the Niagara IceDogs in five games in round two, and the Kingston Frontenacs in five games in round three to reach the finals. Hamilton defeated the top-ranked Sault Ste. Marie Greyhounds in six games to win the J. Ross Robertson Cup, and earn a berth in the 2018 Memorial Cup.

Playoffs bracket

Conference quarterfinals	Conference semifinals
1	Hamilton	4
8	Ottawa	1
1	Hamilton	4
4	Niagara	1
4	Niagara	4
5	Oshawa	1
Eastern Conference
2	Barrie	4
7	Mississauga	2
2	Barrie	2
3	Kingston	4
3	Kingston	4
6	North Bay	1
1	Sault Ste. Marie	4
8	Saginaw	0
1	Sault Ste. Marie	4
4	Owen Sound	3
4	Owen Sound	4
5	London	0
Western Conference
2	Kitchener	4
7	Guelph	2
2	Kitchener	4
3	Sarnia	2
3	Sarnia	4
6	Windsor	2

Conference finals
1	Hamilton	4
3	Kingston	1
1	Sault Ste. Marie	4
2	Kitchener	3

Finals
E1	Hamilton	4
W1	Sault Ste. Marie	2

=== QMJHL playoffs ===
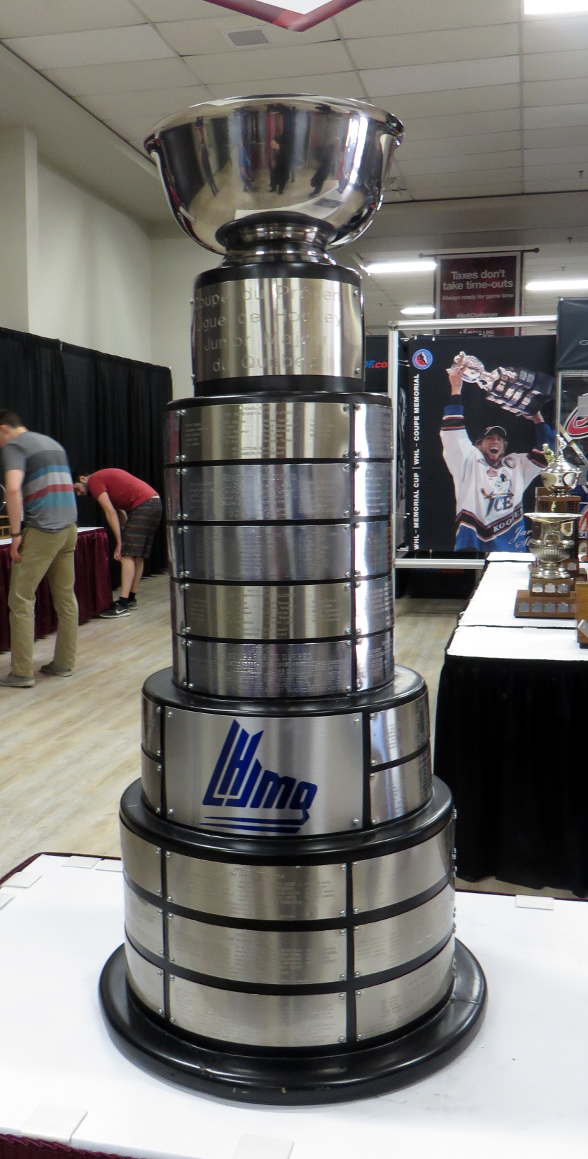
The President's Cup, championship trophy of the QMJHL

The Acadie–Bathurst Titan finished first place in the Maritimes division with 96 points, and second overall in the league. The team was led in scoring by Jeffrey Truchon-Viel with 39 goals, and Antoine Morand with 76 points. In the playoffs, the Titan defeated the Chicoutimi Saguenéens in six games in the first round, then swept both the Sherbrooke Phoenix, and the Victoriaville Tigres in rounds two and three to reach the finals. Acadie–Bathurst defeated the top-ranked Blainville-Boisbriand Armada in six games to win the President's Cup, and earn a berth in the 2018 Memorial Cup.

Playoffs bracket

First round
1	Blainville-Boisbriand	4
16	Val-d'Or	0
2	Acadie–Bathurst	4
15	Chicoutimi	2
3	Rimouski	3
14	Moncton	4
4	Halifax	4
13	Baie-Comeau	1
Note: Pairings are re-seeded after the first and second rounds.
5	Drummondville	4
12	Cape Breton	1
6	Victoriaville	4
11	Gatineau	1
7	Rouyn-Noranda	3
10	Sherbrooke	4
8	Quebec	3
9	Charlottetown	4

Quarterfinals
1	Blainville-Boisbriand	4
14	Moncton	1
2	Acadie–Bathurst	4
10	Sherbrooke	0
4	Halifax	0
9	Charlottetown	4
5	Drummondville	1
6	Victoriaville	4

Semifinals
1	Blainville-Boisbriand	4
9	Charlottetown	3
2	Acadie–Bathurst	4
6	Victoriaville	0

Finals
1	Blainville-Boisbriand	2
2	Acadie–Bathurst	4

=== WHL playoffs ===
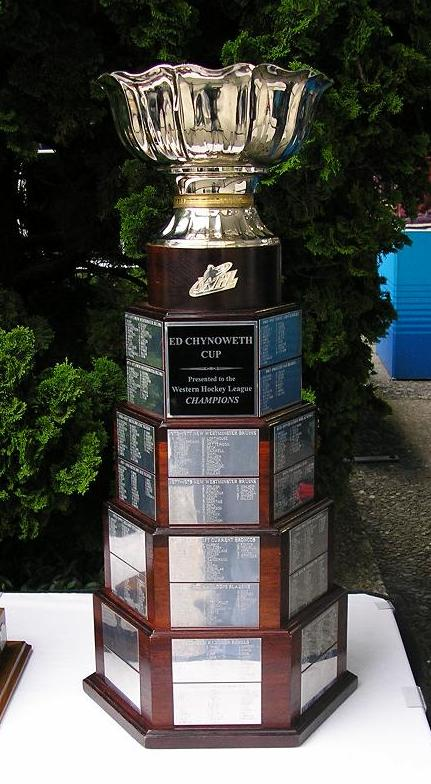
The Ed Chynoweth Cup, championship trophy of the WHL

The Swift Current Broncos finished second place in the Eastern division with 103 points, the second highest point total in the league. The team featured three 100-point-scorers, including Glenn Gawdin (56 goals and 125 points), Aleksi Heponiemi (90 assists and 118 points), and Tyler Steenbergen (47 goals and 102 points). In the playoffs, the Broncos defeated the Regina Pats in seven games in the first round, the top-ranked Moose Jaw Warriors in seven games in the second round, and the Lethbridge Hurricanes in six games in the third round to reach the finals. Swift Current defeated the Everett Silvertips in six games to win the Ed Chynoweth Cup, and earn a berth in the 2018 Memorial Cup.

Playoffs bracket

Conference quarterfinals	Conference semifinals
E1	Moose Jaw	4
W2	Prince Albert	3
E1	Moose Jaw	3
E2	Swift Current	4
E2	Swift Current	4
E3	Regina	3
Eastern
C2	Lethbridge	4
C3	Red Deer	1
C2	Lethbridge	4
W1	Brandon	1
C1	Medicine Hat	2
W1	Brandon	4
U1	Everett	4
W2	Seattle	1
U1	Everett	4
U2	Portland	1
U2	Portland	4
U3	Spokane	3
Western
B2	Victoria	4
B3	Vancouver	3
B2	Victoria	0
W1	Tri-City	4
B1	Kelowna	0
W1	Tri-City	4

Conference finals
E2	Swift Current	4
C2	Lethbridge	2
U1	Everett	4
W1	Tri-City	2

Finals
E2	Swift Current	4
U1	Everett	2

== Team rosters ==
Rosters as listed on the Memorial Cup web site for Regina, Acadie–Bathurst, Hamilton, and Swift Current.

=== Regina Pats ===
- Head coach: John Paddock

Position	#	Player
G	30	Ryan Kubic
G	33	Max Paddock
D	2	Aaron Hyman
D	3	Libor Hájek
D	4	Cale Fleury
D	5	Josh Mahura
D	28	Brady Pouteau
D	40	Parker Gavlas
D	55	Liam Schioler
F	10	Austin Pratt
F	11	Tanner Sidaway
F	13	Jared Legien
F	19	Jake Leschyshyn
F	20	Emil Oksanen
F	21	Nick Henry
F	23	Sam Steel
F	24	Koby Morrisseau
F	25	Scott Mahovlich
F	26	Bryce Platt
F	29	Logan Nijhoff
F	32	Robbie Holmes
F	41	Cameron Hebig
F	77	Matt Bradley

=== Acadie–Bathurst Titan ===
- Head coach: Mario Pouliot

Position	#	Player
G	31	Evan Fitzpatrick
G	35	Joseph Murdaca
D	8	Zachery Bennett
D	13	Adam Holwell
D	14	Keenan MacIsaac
D	26	Olivier Galipeau
D	29	Michal Ivan
D	45	Elijah Francis
D	53	Noah Dobson
F	9	Samuel L'Italien
F	11	Mitchell Balmas
F	12	Domenic Malatesta
F	16	Jordan Maher
F	18	Cole Rafuse
F	25	Jeffrey Viel
F	27	Ethan Crossman
F	28	Samuel Asselin
F	42	Marc-André LeCouffe
F	61	Liam Murphy
F	71	Justin Ducharme
F	88	Antoine Morand
F	98	German Rubtsov

=== Hamilton Bulldogs ===
- Head coach: John Gruden

Position	#	Player
G	29	Nick Donofrio
G	33	Kaden Fulcher
D	5	Justin Lemcke
D	22	Jack Hanley
D	24	Connor Walters
D	42	Ben Gleason
D	52	Nicolas Mattinen
D	61	Riley Stillman
F	10	Nick Caamano
F	11	Isaac Nurse
F	14	William Bitten
F	16	Owen Burnell
F	17	Brandon Saigeon
F	18	Matthew Strome
F	19	Ben Garagan
F	27	Robert Thomas
F	28	Marián Studenič
F	34	Arthur Kaliyev
F	40	Ryan Moore
F	44	MacKenzie Entwistle

=== Swift Current Broncos ===
- Head coach: Emanuel Viveiros

Position	#	Player
G	30	Joel Hofer
G	74	Stuart Skinner
D	2	Colby Sissons
D	3	Josh Anderson
D	4	Jacson Alexander
D	5	Artyom Minulin
D	6	Sahvan Khaira
D	7	Noah King
D	36	Connor Horning
F	10	Kaden Elder
F	13	MacKenzie Wight
F	15	Glenn Gawdin
F	16	Kole Gable
F	17	Tyler Steenbergen
F	19	Beck Malenstyn
F	20	Aleksi Heponiemi
F	23	Max Patterson
F	25	Tanner Nagel
F	26	Andrew Fyten
F	29	Giorgio Estephan
F	34	Matteo Gennaro

== Tournament games ==
The 2018 Memorial Cup tournament was played from May 18 to 27, 2018. (All game times are UTC −4.)

=== Round-robin ===
The first round-robin game featured the host team Regina Pats, versus the OHL champion Hamilton Bulldogs. Robert Thomas scored to give Hamilton a first-period lead, before Sam Steel tied the game for Regina on a power play goal in the first minute of the second period. Each team scored once more in the second period, and were tied 2–2 until the final minute of the third period. Nick Henry scored with 33 seconds remaining to give Regina the game one victory.

May 18	Regina Pats	3–2	Hamilton Bulldogs	Brandt Centre	Recap
No scoring		First period	7:49 – Robert Thomas (1)
Sam Steel (1) – pp – 0:19; Josh Mahura (1) – 15:30		Second period	13:14 – Marián Studenič (1)
Nick Henry (1) – 19:27		Third period	No scoring
Max Paddock (31 saves / 33 shots)		Goalie stats	Kaden Fulcher (27 saves / 30 shots)

The second round-robin game featured the QMJHL champion Acadie–Bathurst Titan, versus the WHL champion Swift Current Broncos. The Titan scored two short-handed goals during regulation to force the game into overtime with a 3–3 tie. Liam Murphy scored for Acadie–Bathurst at 2:58 into overtime to give the Titan a game two victory.

May 19	Acadie–Bathurst Titan	4–3	OT	Swift Current Broncos	Brandt Centre	Recap
Samuel Asselin (1) – 8:02		First period		12:18 – pp – Tyler Steenbergen (1); 18:59 – Giorgio Estephan (1)
Samuel Asselin (2) – sh – 18:07		Second period		19:11 – Giorgio Estephan (2)
Adam Holwell (1) – sh – 5:51		Third period		No scoring
Liam Murphy (1) – 2:58		First overtime period		No scoring
Evan Fitzpatrick (24 saves / 27 shots)		Goalie stats		Stuart Skinner (35 saves / 39 shots)

The third round-robin game featured the two undefeated teams, Regina and Acadie–Bathurst. The teams combined to score 14 goals, the highest scoring match in the 2018 Memorial Cup. The Titan had built up a 7–2 lead by the 1:39 mark of the third period, before Regina scored four consecutive goals to make the score 7–6 with two minutes to play. The Titan then scored an empty net goal with one second remaining to secure a game three victory, and remain undefeated.

May 20	Acadie–Bathurst Titan	8–6	Regina Pats	Brandt Centre	Recap
Noah Dobson (1) – 4:31; Ethan Crossman (1) – 5:35; Liam Murphy (2) – 5:52		First period	0:13 – Cameron Hebig (1)
Samuel Asselin (3) – 3:10; Jeffrey Viel (1) – pp – 8:49; Jeffrey Viel (2) – sh – 13:11		Second period	10:45 – Jared Legien (1)
Ethan Crossman (2) – 1:39; Noah Dobson (2) – en – 19:59		Third period	4:40 – Cameron Hebig (2); 7:39 – pp – Nick Henry (2); 14:10 – Josh Mahura (2); 18:03 – Matt Bradley (1)
Evan Fitzpatrick (32 saves / 38 shots)		Goalie stats	Max Paddock (26 saves / 32 shots); Ryan Kubic (3 saves / 4 shots)

In the fourth round-robin game, the Broncos and Bulldogs faced each other with both teams looking for their first win of the tournament. It was the lowest-scoring game of the round-robin, and Hamilton prevailed with a 2–1 victory on a goal by Marian Studenič with two minutes and one second remaining in the game. Hamilton had 56 shots on net, compared to only 22 for Swift Current. Broncos goaltender Stuart Skinner made 54 saves in the loss, and was named the game's first star.

May 21	Hamilton Bulldogs	2–1	Swift Current Broncos	Brandt Centre	Recap
Mackenzie Entwistle (1) – pp – 5:49		First period	No scoring
No scoring		Second period	9:26 – pp – Colby Sissons (1)
Marian Studenič (2) – 17:59		Third period	No scoring
Kaden Fulcher (21 saves / 22 shots)		Goalie stats	Stuart Skinner (54 saves / 56 shots)

Acadie–Bathurst faced Hamilton in the fifth round-robin game. A win by the Titan would guarantee them a berth in the championship game, or a win by Hamilton would earn at least a semifinal game appearance. The Bulldogs scored twice in the first period for a 2–0 lead, and held on for a 3–2 victory on a game-winning goal by Robert Thomas on a third period power play. Late in the third period the Titan had a power play, but Pouliot made a coaching decision to not pull out the goaltender for an extra attacker. Pouliot's reasoning was strategical, in that if Hamilton scored into an empty net for a two-goal victory, then Hamilton could advance to the final based on the tie-breaking procedure. He chose to defend a one-goal deficit instead to preserve the tie-breaking advantage.

May 22	Hamilton Bulldogs	3–2	Acadie–Bathurst Titan	Brandt Centre	Recap
Benjamin Gleason (1) – pp – 14:33; Nick Caamano (1) – 17:27		First period	No scoring
No scoring		Second period	14:11 – Jeffrey Viel (3)
Robert Thomas (2) – pp – 1:04		Third period	3:44 – Samuel Asselin (4)
Kaden Fulcher (33 saves / 35 shots)		Goalie stats	Evan Fitzpatrick (31 saves / 34 shots)

In the sixth and final round-robin game, the winless Broncos needed a win to force a tie-breaking game, and the Pats needed a win to secure at least a semifinal game appearance. Regina led 4–2 after the second period, and scored a fifth goal at 10:23 into the third period for a 5–2 advantage. Swift Current replied with two goals to pull within one with 2:49 remaining in the game. Libor Hajek scored on a power play for Regina with 1:37 remaining in the game for a two-goal lead. The Broncos scored a power play goal of their own with 50 seconds remaining in the game, but the comeback fell short in a 6–5 victory for Regina.

May 23	Swift Current Broncos	5–6	Regina Pats	Brandt Centre	Recap
No scoring		First period	7:36 – pp – Nick Henry (3); 10:29 – pp – Cameron Hebig (3)
Glenn Gawdin (1) – 11:46; Beck Malenstyn (1) – pp – 16:32		Second period	16:09 – sh – Nick Henry (4); 17:35 – Nick Henry (5)
Aleksi Heponiemi (1) – 14:22; Giorgio Estephan (3) – 17:11; Glenn Gawdin (2) – pp – 19:10		Third period	10:43 – Bryce Platt (1); 18:23 – pp – Libor Hájek (1)
Stuart Skinner (22 saves / 28 shots)		Goalie stats	Max Paddock (26 saves / 31 shots)

Round-robin standings

The Acadie–Bathurst Titan advanced directly to the championship game, based on the tie-breaking procedure for a three-way tie. The Regina Pats and the Hamilton Bulldogs qualified for the semifinal game, based on the same tie-breaking procedure. The Swift Current Broncos finished in fourth place and were eliminated.

Pos	Team	Pld	W	L	GF	GA	
1	Acadie–Bathurst Titan (QMJHL)	3	2	1	14	12	Advanced directly to the championship game
2	Regina Pats (WHL/host)	3	2	1	15	15	Advanced to the semifinal game
2	Hamilton Bulldogs (OHL)	3	2	1	7	6	Advanced to the semifinal game
4	Swift Current Broncos (WHL)	3	0	3	9	12	

=== Semifinal game ===
The semifinal game featured the Regina Pats and Hamilton Bulldogs. Austin Pratt scored the first goal of the game at 5:22 in the first period for Regina, however Nicolas Mattinen of the Bulldogs scored in the second to tie the game. The tie was short-lived as minutes later, the Pats took the lead again. In the third period, Sam Steel, who led the tournament with 13 points, scored the game-winning goal despite Will Bitten of the Bulldogs scoring his first goal of the tournament. In the end, the Pats scored an empty net goal to seal the game 4–2.

May 25	Regina Pats	4–2	Hamilton Bulldogs	Brandt Centre	Recap
Austin Pratt (1) – 5:22		First period	No scoring
Cameron Hebig (4) – 11:00		Second period	7:35 – Nicolas Mattinen (1)
Sam Steel (2) – 14:05; Jake Leschyshyn (1) – en – 19:55		Third period	15:18 – William Bitten (1)
Max Paddock (44 saves / 46 shots)		Goalie stats	Kaden Fulcher (20 saves / 23 shots)

=== Championship game ===
The final game featured Acadie–Bathurst Titan and Regina Pats. Defenceman Adam Holwell scored the first goal of the game in the first period with 3:50 left off an assist from Mitchell Balmas. After a scoreless second period, Samuel Asselin scored his fifth goal of the tournament followed by Ethan Crossman scoring the empty net goal. With an ending of 3–0, the Titan won their first Memorial Cup in franchise history, and became the first QMJHL team since 2013 to do so. Goaltender Evan Fitzpatrick posted a 28-save shutout for the Titan, which last happened in the championship game during the 2005 Memorial Cup.

May 27	Acadie–Bathurst Titan	3–0	Regina Pats	Brandt Centre	Recap
Adam Holwell (2) – 16:10		First period	No scoring
No scoring		Second period	No scoring
Samuel Asselin (5) – 13:02; Ethan Crossman (3) – en – 19:30		Third period	No scoring
Evan Fitzpatrick (28 saves / 28 shots)		Goalie stats	Max Paddock (41 saves / 43 shots)

== Statistical leaders ==
=== Skaters ===
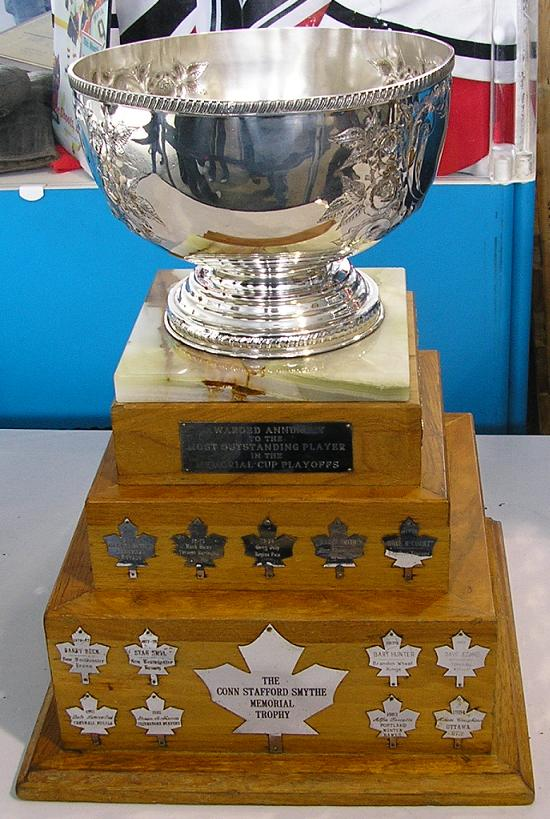
The Stafford Smythe Memorial Trophy, awarded to Sam Steel as the most outstanding player in the Memorial Cup playoffs

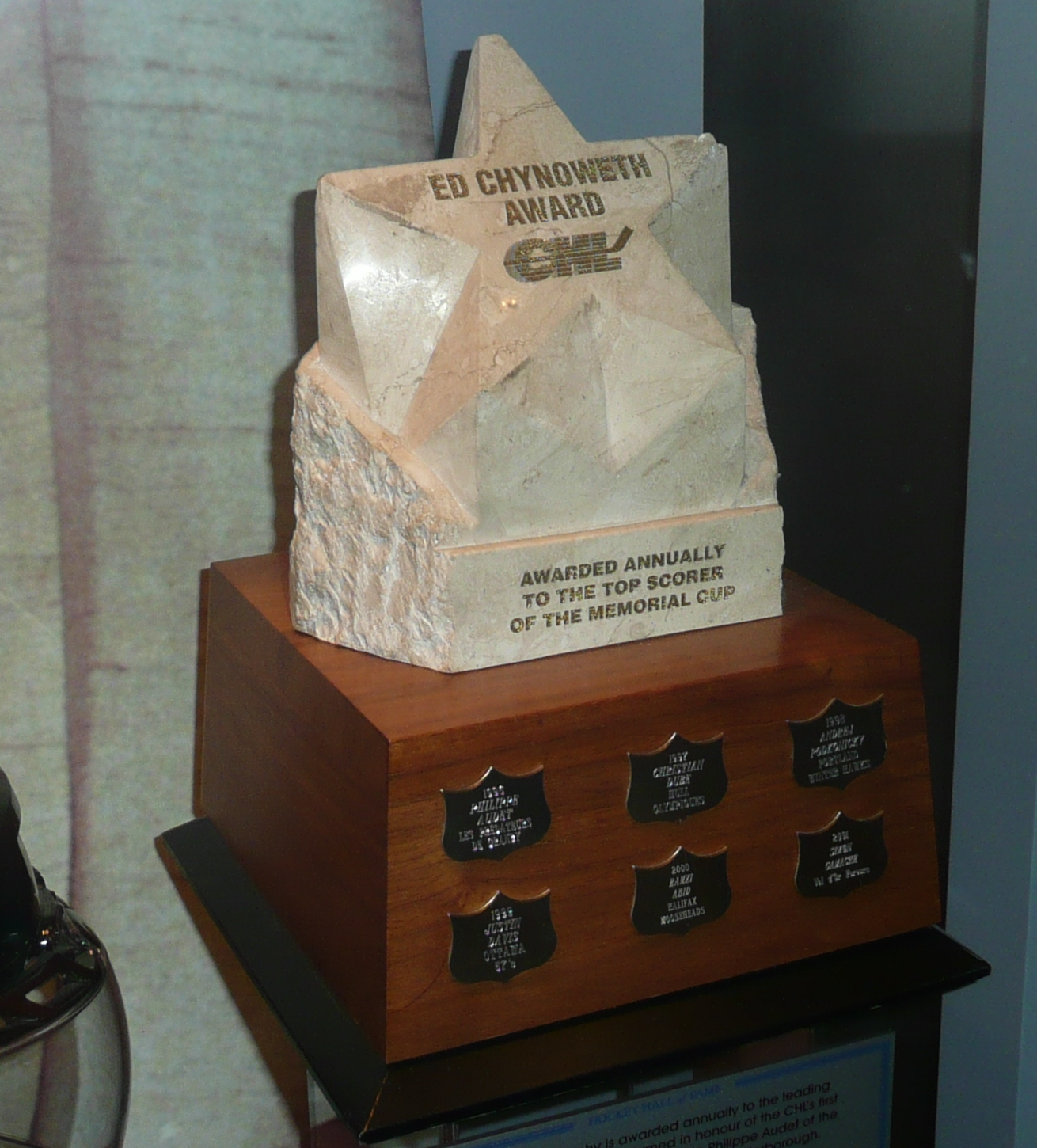
The Ed Chynoweth Trophy, awarded to Sam Steel as the top scorer in the Memorial Cup tournament

Sam Steel led all skaters with 13 points in the 2018 Memorial Cup.

- GP = Games played; G = Goals; A = Assists; Pts = Points; PIM = Penalty minutes

Player	Team	GP	G	A	Pts	PIM
Sam Steel	Regina Pats	5	2	11	13	4
Jeffrey Viel	Acadie–Bathurst Titan	4	3	7	10	4
Nick Henry	Regina Pats	5	5	2	7	4
Noah Dobson	Acadie–Bathurst Titan	4	2	5	7	4
Josh Mahura	Regina Pats	5	2	5	7	2
Samuel Asselin	Acadie–Bathurst Titan	4	5	1	6	2
Cameron Hebig	Regina Pats	5	4	2	6	6
Giorgio Estephan	Swift Current Broncos	3	3	3	6	0
Ben Gleason	Hamilton Bulldogs	4	1	4	5	2
Liam Murphy	Acadie–Bathurst Titan	4	2	2	4	2

=== Goaltenders ===
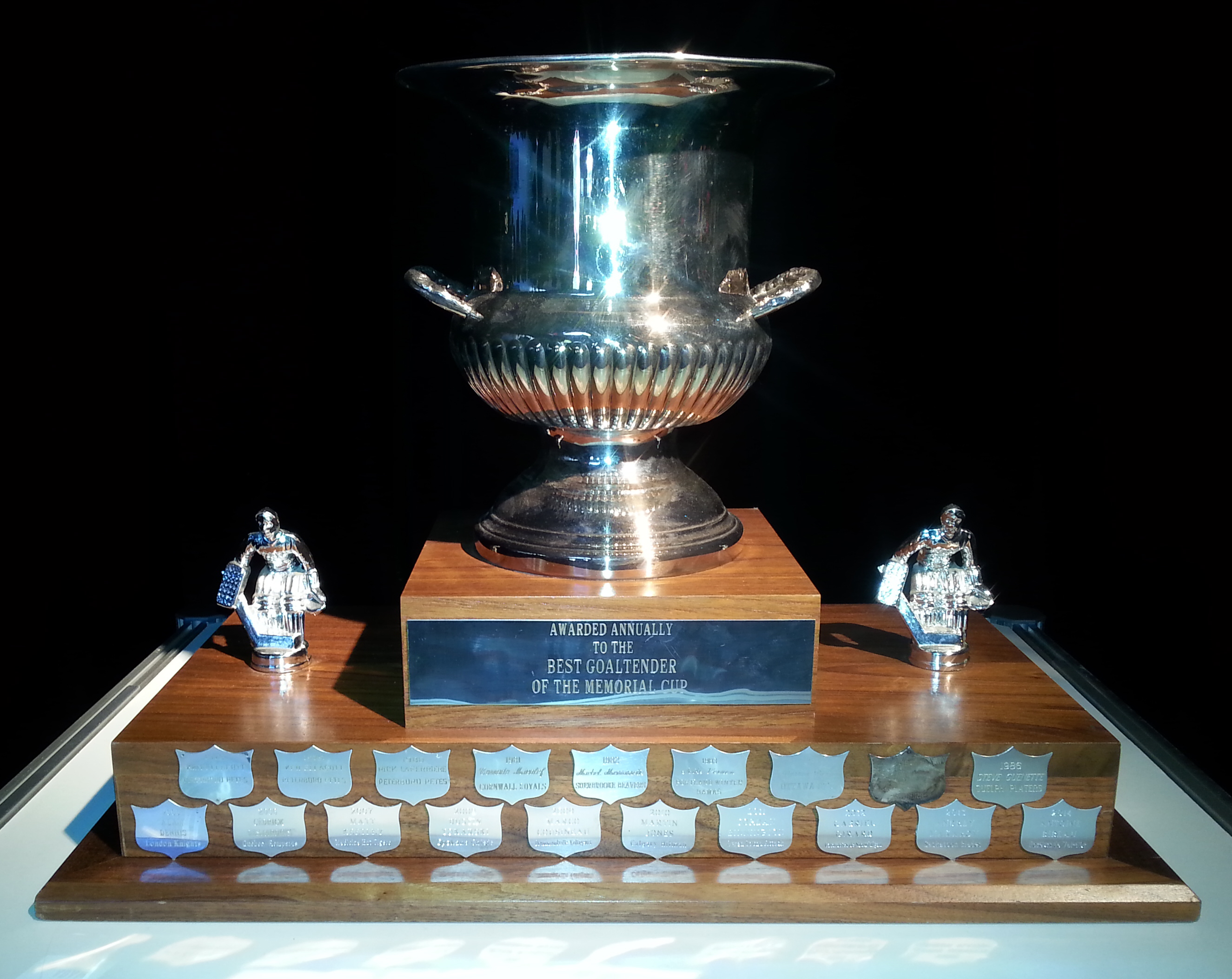
Hap Emms Memorial Trophy, awarded to Kaden Fulcher as the best goaltender in the Memorial Cup tournament

Kaden Fulcher led all goaltenders with a goals against average of 2.27, and save percentage with 0.918.

- GP = Games played; W = Wins; L = Losses; SA = Shots against; GA = Goals against; GAA = Goals against average; SV% = Save percentage; SO = Shutouts; TOI = Time on ice (minutes)

Player	Team	GP	W	L	OTL	SA	GA	GAA	SV%	SO	TOI
Kaden Fulcher	Hamilton Bulldogs	4	2	2	0	110	9	2.27	.918	0	238
Evan Fitzpatrick	Acadie–Bathurst Titan	4	3	1	0	127	12	2.96	.906	1	243
Max Paddock	Regina Pats	5	3	1	0	185	17	3.65	.908	0	280
Stuart Skinner	Swift Current Broncos	3	0	2	1	123	12	4.02	.902	0	179

== Awards ==
The CHL handed out the following awards at the conclusion of the 2018 Memorial Cup:

- Stafford Smythe Memorial Trophy (Most outstanding player): Sam Steel, Regina Pats
- Ed Chynoweth Trophy (Top scorer): Sam Steel, Regina Pats
- George Parsons Trophy (Most sportsmanlike player): Adam Holwell, Acadie–Bathurst Titan
- Hap Emms Memorial Trophy (Best goaltender): Kaden Fulcher, Hamilton Bulldogs
- Memorial Cup All-Star Team:

Goaltender: Max Paddock, Regina Pats
Defence: Noah Dobson, Acadie–Bathurst Titan; Josh Mahura, Regina Pats
Forwards: Sam Steel, Regina Pats; Jeffrey Truchon-Viel, Acadie–Bathurst Titan; Samuel Asselin, Acadie–Bathurst Titan
