= Josh Mahura =

Canadian ice hockey player (born 1998)

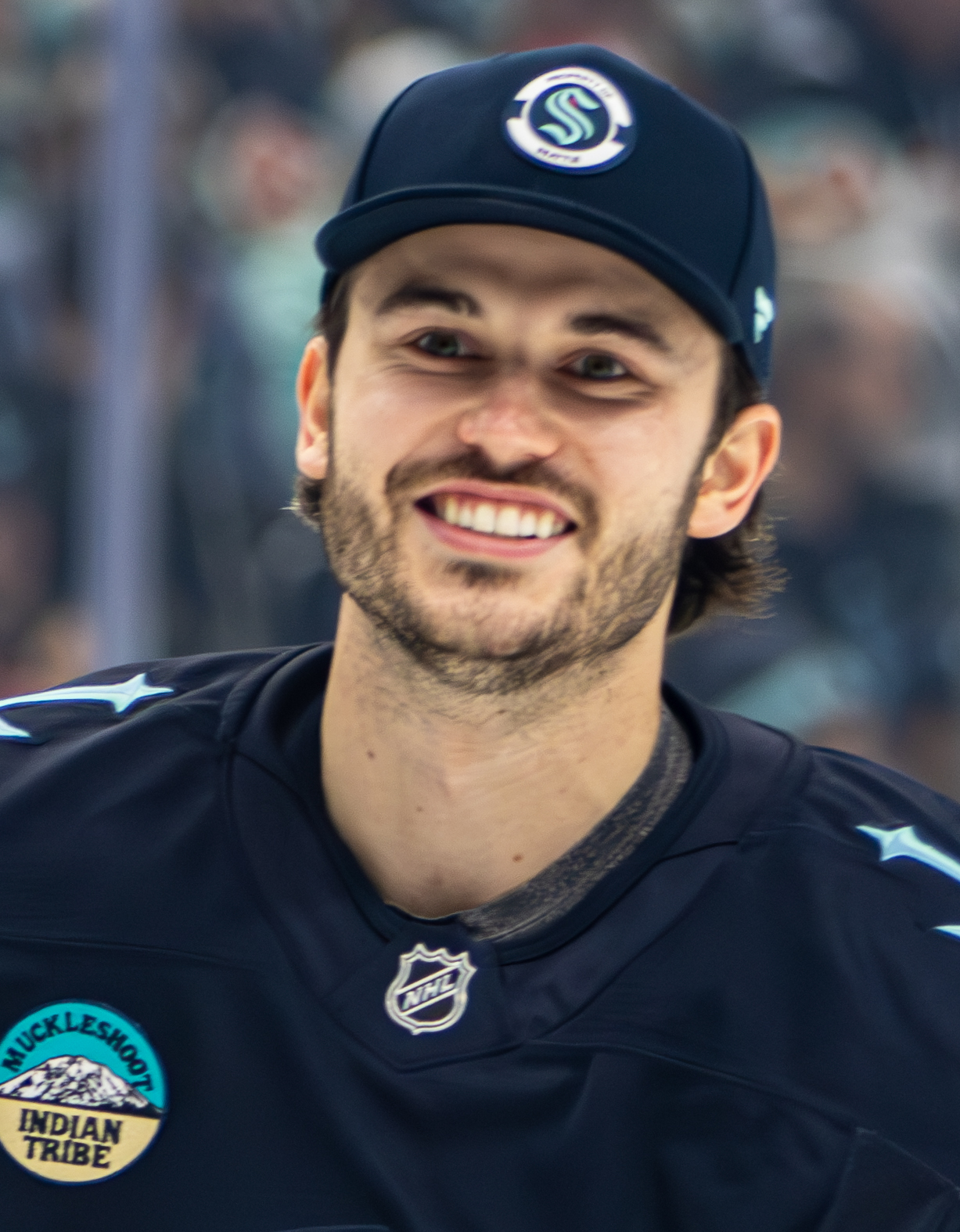
- Mahura in 2024
- Born: May 5, 1998 (age 28) St. Albert, Alberta, Canada
- Height: 6 ft 0 in (183 cm)
- Weight: 192 lb (87 kg; 13 st 10 lb)
- Position: Defence
- Shoots: Left
- NHL team Former teams: Seattle Kraken; Anaheim Ducks; Florida Panthers
- NHL draft: 85th overall, 2016; Anaheim Ducks
- Playing career: 2018–present

Joshua Mahura (born May 5, 1998) is a Canadian professional ice hockey player who is a defenceman for the Seattle Kraken of the National Hockey League (NHL).

== Playing career ==
=== Junior ===
Mahura began his major junior hockey career with the Red Deer Rebels, who had drafted him in the second round, 36th overall, in the 2013 WHL Draft.

In his second year with the Rebels, and his first year as a draft eligible player, Mahura tore his medial collateral ligament (MCL) and missed the entire regular season to recover. He returned in May 2016 to play in the 2016 Memorial Cup. Mahura was drafted in the third round, 85th overall, by the Anaheim Ducks in the 2016 NHL entry draft.

On January 10, 2017, Mahura was traded by the Rebels mid-season to the Regina Pats along with Jeff de Wit and a 2019 conditional third-round pick in exchange for Lane Zablocki, Dawson Barteaux, a 2017 first-round pick, a either 2018 or 2019 first-round pick, and a 2020 conditional third-round pick. At the time of the trade, Mahura had collected nine goals and 24 assists in 39 games. He was signed to a three-year, entry-level contract by the Ducks on May 18, 2017. The following season, Mahura was named an alternate captain for the Pats, alongside Jake Leschyshyn and Matt Bradley.

=== Professional ===
During his first professional season in 2018–19, Mahura was recalled to the Ducks from AHL affiliate, the San Diego Gulls, on November 18, 2018, after injuries to Cam Fowler and Hampus Lindholm. He made his NHL debut that night against the Colorado Avalanche, recording a plus 2 and six blocks. Mahura was one of four rookie defencemen to play that night. The Ducks had not played four rookie defencemen in one game since May 3, 1995.

Prior to the 2022–23 season, on October 10, 2022, Mahura was claimed off waivers by the Florida Panthers.

In the following 2023–24 season, Mahura was limited to 30 regular season games due to injuries as the Panthers went on to win their first Stanley Cup in franchise history. With the Panthers requesting an injury exemption, his name was engraved on the cup.

As a free agent from the Panthers, Mahura was signed to a one-year, $775,000 contract with the Seattle Kraken on July 3, 2024.

== Personal life ==
Mahura's brother Luke also plays hockey. He played in the WHL for the Prince Albert Raiders and currently plays for the Morinville Kings of the North Central Senior Hockey League.

== Career statistics ==
=== Regular season and playoffs ===
			Regular season					Playoffs
Season	Team	League	GP	G	A	Pts	PIM	GP	G	A	Pts	PIM
2014–15	Red Deer Rebels	WHL	51	2	6	8	20	5	0	1	1	2
2015–16	Red Deer Rebels	WHL	2	0	1	1	0	17	2	2	4	6
2016–17	Red Deer Rebels	WHL	39	9	24	33	35	—	—	—	—	—
2016–17	Regina Pats	WHL	34	8	12	20	22	23	8	13	21	16
2017–18	Regina Pats	WHL	60	22	47	69	42	7	0	5	5	8
2018–19	San Diego Gulls	AHL	40	1	18	19	10	9	0	0	0	2
2018–19	Anaheim Ducks	NHL	17	1	4	5	4	—	—	—	—	—
2019–20	San Diego Gulls	AHL	44	4	17	21	40	—	—	—	—	—
2019–20	Anaheim Ducks	NHL	11	1	3	4	2	—	—	—	—	—
2020–21	San Diego Gulls	AHL	28	6	14	20	16	3	0	0	0	2
2020–21	Anaheim Ducks	NHL	13	1	3	4	4	—	—	—	—	—
2021–22	Anaheim Ducks	NHL	38	3	4	7	12	—	—	—	—	—
2022–23	Florida Panthers	NHL	82	4	12	16	48	21	0	3	3	6
2023–24	Florida Panthers	NHL	30	0	9	9	20	—	—	—	—	—
2024–25	Seattle Kraken	NHL	64	0	9	9	20	—	—	—	—	—
2025–26	Seattle Kraken	NHL	23	1	2	3	16	—	—	—	—	—
NHL totals			278	11	46	57	126	21	0	3	3	6

=== International ===
Year	Team	Event	Result	GP	G	A	Pts	PIM
2015	Canada	IH18	1st place, gold medalist(s)	4	1	0	1	2
Junior totals				4	1	0	1	2

== Awards and honours ==
Award	Year	Ref
WHL
East Second All-Star Team	2018	
CHL Memorial Cup All-Star Team	2018	
NHL
Stanley Cup champion	2024	
