= Sam Steel =

Canadian ice hockey player (born 1998)

- Born: February 3, 1998 (age 28) Sherwood Park, Alberta, Canada
- Height: 6 ft 0 in (183 cm)
- Weight: 185 lb (84 kg; 13 st 3 lb)
- Position: Centre
- Shoots: Left
- NHL team Former teams: Dallas Stars; Anaheim Ducks; Minnesota Wild
- NHL draft: 30th overall, 2016; Anaheim Ducks
- Playing career: 2018–present

Sam Steel (born February 3, 1998) is a Canadian professional ice hockey player who is a centre for the Dallas Stars of the National Hockey League (NHL). Steel was selected 30th overall in the 2016 NHL entry draft by the Anaheim Ducks. He also formerly played for the Minnesota Wild.

== Playing career ==
=== Junior career ===
Steel first played junior hockey as a youth in his hometown of Sherwood Park, Alberta. While playing for and captaining the Sherwood Park AAA Flyers, Steel was selected with the second overall pick in the 2013 Western Hockey League (WHL) Bantam draft by the Regina Pats. On August 28, 2013, he signed a standard player contract with the Pats. After appearing with the Sherwood Park Crusaders of the Alberta Junior Hockey League (AJHL), Steel completed the 2013–14 season by making his WHL debut with the Regina Pats, featuring in five games. The following season he finished with 54 points in 61 games as the Pats retooled and made Steel and other young players the focus of their team.

In the 2015–16 season, Steel put up 70 points. After an impressive 2016–17 season in which he led the WHL in scoring, Steel was awarded the Four Broncos Memorial Trophy as WHL Player of the Year and the Bob Clarke Trophy as the league's points leader. The Pats went to the WHL final, but lost to the Seattle Thunderbirds. In his final season with the Pats, Steel was named the Pats' captain. As a member of the 2018 Memorial Cup host team, and despite a 1–2 round robin record, Steel led the hosts to the final, ultimately losing the national championship game 0–3 to Acadie-Bathurst Titan. While not on the championship winning team, Steel was awarded the Stafford Smythe Memorial Trophy as Tournament MVP, and Ed Chynoweth Trophy as leading scorer (2 goals, 11 assists).

=== Professional career ===
After the completion of his second full major junior season with Regina in 2015–16, Steel was selected by the Anaheim Ducks of the National Hockey League (NHL) in the same position he was ranked by the NHL Central Scouting, as the final pick of the first round (30th overall) of the 2016 NHL entry draft. The Ducks previously traded goaltender Frederik Andersen to the Toronto Maple Leafs to obtain the selection used to select Steel. On December 21, 2016, Steel signed a three-year, entry-level contract with Anaheim.

Steel joined the Ducks for their 2018–19 season, making his NHL debut on October 3 in a game against the San Jose Sharks. He recorded his first career NHL goal in a 4–2 loss to the Buffalo Sabres on October 21. Steel recorded his first career NHL hat-trick in a 5–4 win over the Vancouver Canucks on March 26, 2019, becoming the youngest player in Ducks history to score a regular season hat-trick. A restricted free agent at the end of his contract, the Ducks did not extend a qualifying offer to retain his rights and Steel became an unrestricted free agent on July 1, 2022.

On August 30, 2022, it was announced that Steel had signed a one-year contract with the Minnesota Wild. In the following 2022–23 season Steel had a breakout season with the Wild, playing alongside Kirill Kaprizov and Mats Zuccarello. Steel established new career highs offensively in registering 10 goals, 18 assists for 28 points through 65 regular season games. As a pending restricted free agent, Steel was not tendered a qualifying offer by the Wild due to salary cap considerations on June 29, 2023.

Released as an unrestricted free agent, Steel was promptly signed at the opening of free agent frenzy to a one-year, $850,000 contract with the Dallas Stars on July 1, 2023. In his first season in Dallas, Steel had 24 points in 77 games and added 5 more points in the 2024 Stanley Cup playoffs. At the end of the season he was once again a restricted free agent and, once again, did not receive a qualifying offer. However, before he could become an unrestricted free agent, he signed a one-year, $1.2 million contract to remain with Dallas on June 30, 2024.

== International play ==
Medal record

Representing Canada

Men's ice hockey

World Junior Championships
Gold medal – first place	2018 United States	

Ivan Hlinka Memorial Tournament
Gold medal – first place	2015 Břeclav/Bratislava	

In August 2015, he was a member of the gold medal Canadian Junior team at the 2015 Ivan Hlinka Memorial Tournament held in Břeclav, Czech Republic. On December 15, 2017, Steel was named to the 22-man roster to represent Canada at the IIHF World U20 Championship. Canada and Team USA took part in the first outdoor game in the World U20 Championship history during the tournament at New Era Arena, Orchard Park, New York. The game was tied after regulation time and Steel was among the players selected by Canada for the shootout to decide the game. Steel was one of three Canadians who missed and Canada lost to Team USA. However, Canada went on to win the gold medal as tournament champions, beating Sweden 3–1 in the final.

== Personal life ==
Steel grew up in Sherwood Park, Alberta and was friends with NHL goaltender Carter Hart as a child. Steel's older brother Patrick also played hockey. While playing hockey for the Canmore Eagles of the AJHL, Patrick died from an undetected heart problem.

== Career statistics ==
=== Regular season and playoffs ===
			Regular season					Playoffs
Season	Team	League	GP	G	A	Pts	PIM	GP	G	A	Pts	PIM
2013–14	Sherwood Park Crusaders	AJHL	1	0	0	0	0	—	—	—	—	—
2013–14	Regina Pats	WHL	5	0	0	0	0	2	0	0	0	0
2014–15	Regina Pats	WHL	61	17	37	54	16	—	—	—	—	—
2015–16	Regina Pats	WHL	72	23	47	70	24	12	6	10	16	4
2016–17	Regina Pats	WHL	66	50	81	131	40	23	11	19	30	8
2017–18	Regina Pats	WHL	54	33	50	83	18	7	1	10	11	2
2018–19	Anaheim Ducks	NHL	22	6	5	11	8	—	—	—	—	—
2018–19	San Diego Gulls	AHL	53	20	21	41	24	16	6	7	13	8
2019–20	Anaheim Ducks	NHL	65	6	16	22	20	—	—	—	—	—
2020–21	Anaheim Ducks	NHL	42	6	6	12	8	—	—	—	—	—
2021–22	Anaheim Ducks	NHL	68	6	14	20	16	—	—	—	—	—
2022–23	Minnesota Wild	NHL	65	10	18	28	18	5	1	1	2	2
2023–24	Dallas Stars	NHL	77	9	15	24	29	19	1	4	5	2
2024–25	Dallas Stars	NHL	79	6	19	25	31	18	1	6	7	18
2025–26	Dallas Stars	NHL	73	12	21	33	24	6	0	0	0	2
NHL totals			491	61	114	175	154	48	3	11	14	24

=== International ===
Year	Team	Event	Result	GP	G	A	Pts	PIM
2014	Canada Black	U17	7th	5	1	2	3	4
2015	Canada	IH18	1st place, gold medalist(s)	4	1	2	3	2
2018	Canada	WJC	1st place, gold medalist(s)	7	4	5	9	0
Junior totals				16	6	9	15	6

== Awards and honours ==
Award	Year
WHL
CHL Top Prospects Game	2016
East First All-Star Team	2017
Bob Clarke Trophy	2017
Four Broncos Memorial Trophy	2017
CHL Top Scorer Award	2017
Stafford Smythe Memorial Trophy	2018

Awards and achievements
Preceded by Max Jones	Anaheim Ducks first-round draft pick 2016	Succeeded by Isac Lundeström
