= Jeffrey Viel =

Canadian ice hockey player (born 1997)

- Viel with Tampa Bay Lightning in 2026
- Born: January 28, 1997 (age 29) Rimouski, Quebec, Canada
- Height: 6 ft 2 in (188 cm)
- Weight: 205 lb (93 kg; 14 st 9 lb)
- Position: Forward
- Shoots: Left
- NHL team Former teams: Tampa Bay Lightning; San Jose Sharks; Boston Bruins; Anaheim Ducks
- NHL draft: Undrafted
- Playing career: 2018–present

Jeffrey Truchon-Viel (born January 28, 1997) is a Canadian professional ice hockey player who is a forward for the Tampa Bay Lightning of the National Hockey League (NHL). He previously played for the San Jose Sharks, Boston Bruins, and Anaheim Ducks.

== Early life ==
Viel was born on January 28, 1997, in Rimouski, Quebec, Canada.

== Playing career ==
=== Amateur ===
Growing up in Quebec, Viel played Midget AAA ice hockey with the Gauls from Collège Antoine-Girouard alongside Anthony Beauvillier. As a result of his physical style of play, he finished his rookie campaign on the team's second line and was drafted in the fourth round of the 2013 Quebec Major Junior Hockey League (QMJHL) Draft by the Sherbrooke Phoenix. Upon entering the league, Viel admitted to being "immature" and not maintaining healthy eating habits.

Following his rookie season, Viel was traded to the Acadie–Bathurst Titan in the summer of 2014, where he remained for the remainder of his major junior career. He made his debut with the team during the first week of the 2014–15 regular season against the Cape Breton Screaming Eagles, where he also scored his first goal of the season. In his first season with the Titans, Viel was the second-leading scorer on the team with 45 points although they finished 19 points out from a playoff spot.

Near the beginning of the 2017–18 season, Viel received his first suspension of the season after charging an opponent during a game. On February 20, 2018, Viel was suspended four games for shoulder-checking an opponent in the head during a game against the Cape Breton Screaming Eagles. In spite of his suspension, Viel helped the team win the President's Cup as the QMJHL's Champions and earn the Guy Lafleur Trophy as the tournament's most valuable player. During Game 1 of the semi-final round of the 2018 Memorial Cup, Viel two goals and assisted on two more as the Titan beat the Victoriaville Tigres 6–3. He continued to assist the team is scoring and entered Game 3 of the Memorial Cup finals with 23 points across 20 post-season games. During Game 3, Viel scored one goal to help lift the Titan to their first Memorial Cup in franchise history. As a result of his successful season, Viel was also named to the tournament's All-Star Team.

=== Professional ===
Following his Memorial Cup win, Viel joined the San Jose Barracuda, the American Hockey League (AHL) affiliate of the San Jose Sharks. In his first season with the team, he recorded 22 points, 94 penalty minutes, and 116 shots on goal. As a result, he was signed to a two-year, two-way contract with the Sharks on May 29, 2019.

In the pandemic-delayed 2020–21 season, Viel made his NHL debut with the Sharks against the Minnesota Wild on March 29, 2021. In his first NHL shift, he recorded his first fight against Luke Johnson, finishing scoreless in a 4–3 shootout victory. During the 2021 offseason, Viel signed a two-year extension to remain with the Sharks. He scored his first NHL goal on December 28, 2021, in 8–7 shootout victory over the Arizona Coyotes.

On July 1, 2023, having left the Sharks as a free agent Viel was signed to a one-year, $775,000 contract with the Winnipeg Jets for the 2023–24 season. Viel played the entire season in the AHL with the Manitoba Moose.

After a lone season within the Jets organization, Viel left the club without featuring at the NHL level. As a free agent, Viel was signed to a league minimum two-year contract with the Boston Bruins on July 1, 2024.

Viel made the Bruins' opening night roster to start the 2025–26 season. After appearing in 10 games with the Bruins through the mid point of the season, on January 16, 2026, Viel was traded by the Bruins to the Anaheim Ducks in exchange for a fourth-round draft pick in 2026. On April 24, 2026, he scored his first playoff points when he scored on Edmonton Oilers goalie Connor Ingram late in the third period of Game 3 of the Ducks' first round series during the 2026 Stanley Cup playoffs; earlier in the period, he had cross-checked Darnell Nurse, which lead to an Oilers powerplay and Connor McDavid's first goal in the series. In Game 4, he tied the game in the third period when he stuffed in a loose puck after a John Carlson shot from the blue line deflected off bodies in front of the net. The Ducks went on to win the game, 4-3, in overtime.

On July 1, 2026, having impressed through his shortened tenure with the Ducks, Viel as a free agent was signed to a five-year, $12.5 million contract with the Tampa Bay Lightning.

== Career statistics ==
			Regular season					Playoffs
Season	Team	League	GP	G	A	Pts	PIM	GP	G	A	Pts	PIM
2012–13	Collège Antoine-Girouard Gaulois	QMAAA	41	10	9	19	44	13	4	6	10	12
2013–14	Collège Antoine-Girouard Gaulois	QMAAA	42	22	23	45	80	3	1	0	1	12
2013–14	Sherbrooke Phoenix	QMJHL	8	0	0	0	2	—	—	—	—	—
2014–15	Acadie–Bathurst Titan	QMJHL	64	8	10	18	121	—	—	—	—	—
2015–16	Acadie–Bathurst Titan	QMJHL	66	33	23	56	132	5	2	5	7	4
2016–17	Acadie–Bathurst Titan	QMJHL	63	35	25	60	117	11	10	5	15	16
2017–18	Acadie–Bathurst Titan	QMJHL	58	39	23	62	127	20	14	9	23	34
2018–19	San Jose Barracuda	AHL	68	11	11	22	94	4	1	0	1	6
2019–20	San Jose Barracuda	AHL	54	13	17	30	103	—	—	—	—	—
2020–21	San Jose Barracuda	AHL	17	2	2	4	31	—	—	—	—	—
2020–21	San Jose Sharks	NHL	11	0	0	0	23	—	—	—	—	—
2021–22	San Jose Barracuda	AHL	13	4	2	6	20	—	—	—	—	—
2021–22	San Jose Sharks	NHL	34	3	2	5	114	—	—	—	—	—
2022–23	San Jose Barracuda	AHL	60	15	16	31	150	—	—	—	—	—
2022–23	San Jose Sharks	NHL	4	0	0	0	2	—	—	—	—	—
2023–24	Manitoba Moose	AHL	69	17	23	40	142	2	0	0	0	6
2024–25	Providence Bruins	AHL	68	13	24	37	148	8	0	1	1	14
2024–25	Boston Bruins	NHL	5	0	0	0	14	—	—	—	—	—
2025–26	Boston Bruins	NHL	10	0	0	0	30	—	—	—	—	—
2025–26	Anaheim Ducks	NHL	35	3	7	10	49	12	2	2	4	17
NHL totals			99	6	9	15	232	12	2	2	4	17

== Awards and honours ==
Award	Year
QMJHL
Guy Lafleur Trophy	2018
President's Cup (Acadie–Bathurst Titan)	2018
CHL Memorial Cup All-Star Team	2018
Memorial Cup (Acadie–Bathurst Titan)	2018
