= 1928 Memorial Cup =

Canadian junior ice hockey championship

The Memorial Cup trophy

The 1928 Memorial Cup final was the tenth junior ice hockey championship of the Canadian Amateur Hockey Association. The George Richardson Memorial Trophy champions Ottawa Gunners of the Ottawa City Junior Hockey League in Eastern Canada competed against the Abbott Cup champions Regina Monarchs of the South Saskatchewan Junior Hockey League in Western Canada. In a best-of-three series, held at Arena Gardens and Varsity Arena in Toronto, Ontario, Regina won their first Memorial Cup, defeating Ottawa 2 games to 1.

== Background ==
The Regina Monarchs were formed by the merger of the Regina Pats and Regina Falcons. They had defeated the Kenora Thistles for the Western Canadian championship.

== Scores ==
Regina won the first game 4-3, with Mush March scoring all four goals for the team. Ottawa won game two with a score of 2-1. Regina won game three 7-1, securing the Memorial Cup.

== Winning roster ==
John Achtzner, Carl Bergl, Len Dowie, Chuck Farrow, Jim Langford, Mush March, G. Parron, Harold Shaw, Swede Williamson. Manager and Coach: Howie Milne
