= Noah Dobson =

Canadian ice hockey player (born 2000)

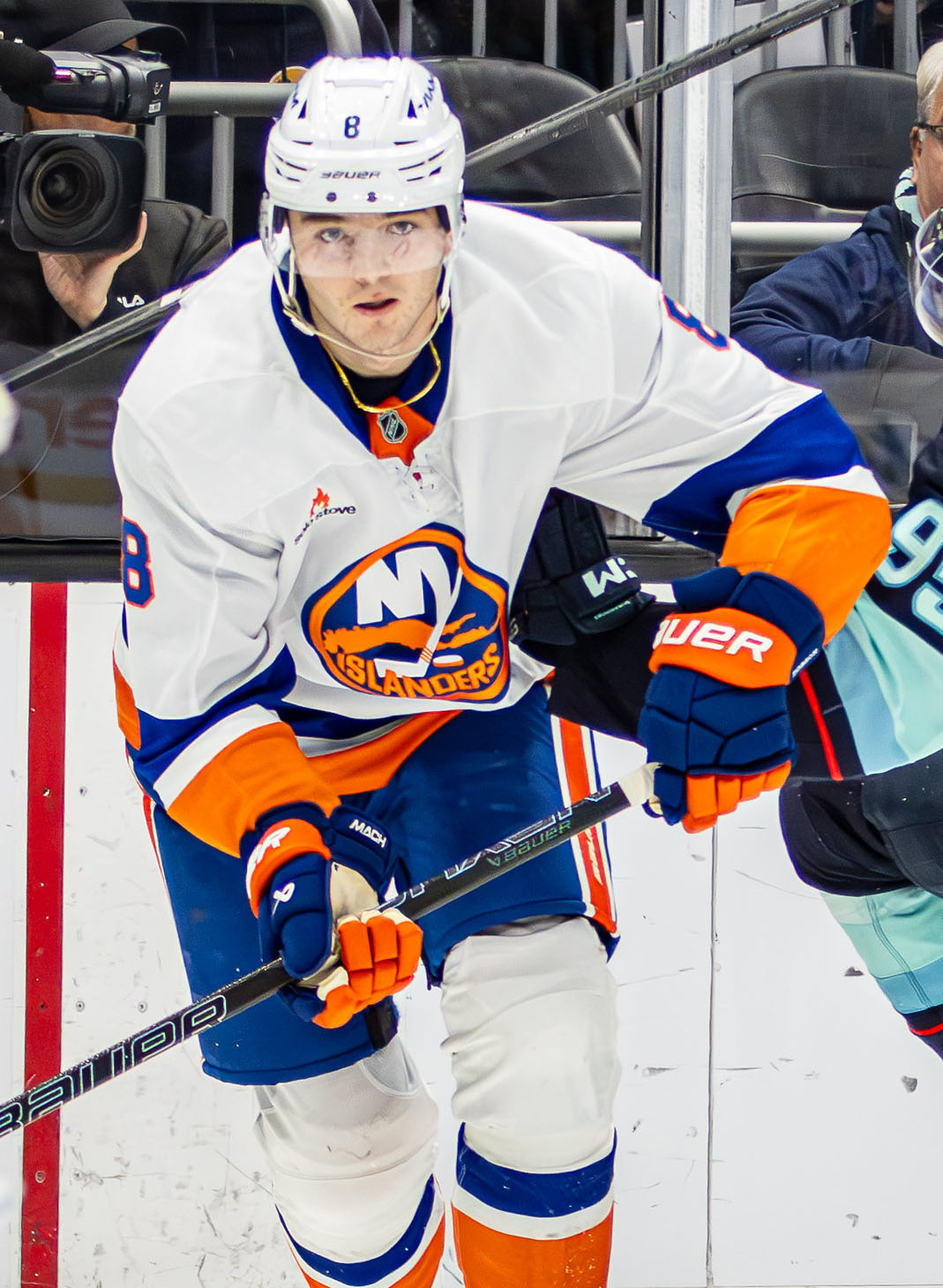
- Dobson with the New York Islanders in November 2024
- Born: January 7, 2000 (age 26) Summerside, Prince Edward Island, Canada
- Height: 6 ft 4 in (193 cm)
- Weight: 200 lb (91 kg; 14 st 4 lb)
- Position: Defence
- Shoots: Right
- NHL team Former teams: Montreal Canadiens; New York Islanders
- National team: Canada
- NHL draft: 12th overall, 2018; New York Islanders
- Playing career: 2019–present

Noah Dobson (born January 7, 2000) is a Canadian professional ice hockey player who is a defenceman for the Montreal Canadiens of the National Hockey League (NHL). He was selected in the first round, 12th overall, by the New York Islanders in the 2018 NHL entry draft.

== Playing career ==
=== Early years ===
Growing up in western Prince Edward Island, Dobson began skating at age four. Showing early promise as an athlete, he was given permission by Hockey PEI, the governing body of ice hockey in the province, to enroll in organized hockey at a younger age than his peers and consistently played in older age groups. As member of the PEI Rocket, he participated in the 2012 edition of the Quebec International Pee-Wee Hockey Tournament; his team became the first Prince Edward Island entrant to win the event, and Dobson was named as the best defenceman of the tournament. In 2014, he left home to attend Bishop's College School in Lennoxville, Quebec. Thereafter, Dobson considered moving to Toronto and joining the Don Mills Flyers of the Greater Toronto Hockey League (GTHL), but was ultimately recruited to EC Red Bull Salzburg overseas in Austria. He would spend a single season abroad, during which time he lived with former NHL player Brian Savage, whose son Redmond also played at the academy.

=== Junior ===
Considered one of the top players at his position, Dobson was drafted in the first round, sixth overall, by the Acadie–Bathurst Titan at the 2016 Quebec Major Junior Hockey League (QMJHL) draft. Following his second year of major junior in 2017–18, Dobson was named to the QMJHL First All-Star Team after finishing tied for second place among defenceman for points with 69. For his efforts, he would earn nomination for the Emile Bouchard Trophy as the league's best defencemen as well as the Michael Bossy Trophy (best professional prospect) and Kevin Lowe Trophy (best defensive defenceman) respectively.

In June 2018, Dobson was selected 12th overall by the New York Islanders in the 2018 NHL entry draft. Two months later, the Islanders signed him to a three-year, entry-level contract.

Entering play for the 2018–19 season, Dobson was selected as team captain for the Titan. Having scored 16 points in 28 games for the rebuilding franchise, Dobson was subsequently traded to the Rouyn-Noranda Huskies during the annual World Junior Championships in January 2019. With the Huskies, Dobson won his second consecutive Memorial Cup.

=== Professional ===
==== New York Islanders (2019–25) ====
Officially earning a roster spot with the Islanders ahead of the 2019–20 season, Dobson's NHL debut came versus the Edmonton Oilers on October 8, 2019, where he recorded his first NHL point, a primary assist on a goal by Matt Martin. On January 14, 2020, in his eighteenth career game, Dobson scored his first NHL goal against Calvin Pickard of the Detroit Red Wings.

During the 2021–22 season, Dobson recorded 51 points through 80 games played. That off-season, he would agree to a three-year extension with the team. In April 2024, Dobson became the second defenceman in franchise history to record at least 60 assists in a single season. He finished the 2023–24 campaign with 70 points, becoming the first Islanders defenceman to reach this plateau since Denis Potvin in 1983–84.

Following this success, Dobson entered the 2024–25 season, the final year of his contract, with high expectations to "take another step and have a bigger year." The season that followed would prove to be a disappointment, both for the player and the team. Dobson saw a significant decline in his offensive production, with 10 goals and 29 assists in 71 games played, and his performance was the subject of significant criticism both in the media and among Islanders fans. The Islanders missed the playoffs for the first time in three seasons, and subsequently hired Mathieu Darche to replace Lou Lamoriello as general manager.

==== Montreal Canadiens (2025–present) ====
On June 27, 2025, Dobson was traded by the Islanders to the Montreal Canadiens in exchange for Emil Heineman and two first round picks in the 2025 NHL entry draft (subsequently used to select Victor Eklund and Kashawn Aitcheson). Immediately following the transaction, he was signed to an eight-year contract extension worth $9.5 million annually with the Canadiens. Dobson's role on the Canadiens upon arrival differed from his prior role on the Islanders, as he was not the team's primary power play specialist, that role already being filled by Lane Hutson. He instead saw significant usage on the penalty kill. Dobson appeared in 80 games over the course of the 2025–26 season, managing 12 goals and 35 assists prior to suffering an injury after blocking a shot with his thumb in a game on April 11 versus the Columbus Blue Jackets. Thereafter, it was announced that he would miss the remainder of the regular season as well as the start of the ensuing 2026 Stanley Cup playoffs. Dobson returned to the Canadiens' lineup for Game 7 of their first round series against the Tampa Bay Lightning on May 3.

== International play ==
Medal record

Men's ice hockey

Representing Canada

Ivan Hlinka Memorial Tournament
Gold medal – first place	2017 Czech Republic/Slovakia	

Internationally, Dobson first represented Hockey Canada as part of team Canada Red at the 2016 World U-17 Hockey Challenge where his team ultimately finished in sixth place. The following year, he won a gold medal as part of the national under-18 team at the Ivan Hlinka Memorial Tournament. Dobson then participated with the national junior team at the 2019 World Junior Championships but failed to secure a podium finish following an overtime loss in his country's quarterfinals matchup against Finland. During the contest, Dobson's stick infamously broke on an attempted one-timer prior to Finnish defenceman Toni Utunen scoring the game-winning goal moments later.

In May 2025, Dobson made his national senior team debut at the annual IIHF World Championship.

== Personal life ==
Dobson was born in Summerside, Prince Edward Island, to parents Andrew and Jenny originally from Bathurst, New Brunswick. He has one sibling, a sister named Elly.

In July 2024, Dobson got engaged to American sports reporter Alexa Serowik. The couple married at the Rosecliff Mansion located in Newport, Rhode Island on Canada Day a year later.

== Career statistics ==
=== Regular season and playoffs ===
			Regular season					Playoffs
Season	Team	League	GP	G	A	Pts	PIM	GP	G	A	Pts	PIM
2016–17	Acadie–Bathurst Titan	QMJHL	63	7	19	26	40	11	0	5	5	2
2017–18	Acadie–Bathurst Titan	QMJHL	67	17	52	69	52	20	3	10	13	24
2018–19	Acadie–Bathurst Titan	QMJHL	28	9	7	16	36	—	—	—	—	—
2018–19	Rouyn-Noranda Huskies	QMJHL	28	6	30	36	24	20	8	21	29	20
2019–20	New York Islanders	NHL	34	1	6	7	8	1	0	0	0	0
2020–21	New York Islanders	NHL	46	3	11	14	8	19	0	7	7	0
2021–22	New York Islanders	NHL	80	13	38	51	18	—	—	—	—	—
2022–23	New York Islanders	NHL	78	13	36	49	20	6	0	2	2	2
2023–24	New York Islanders	NHL	79	10	60	70	36	5	0	1	1	6
2024–25	New York Islanders	NHL	71	10	29	39	28	—	—	—	—	—
2025–26	Montreal Canadiens	NHL	80	12	35	47	34	13	0	1	1	2
NHL totals			468	62	215	277	152	44	0	11	11	10

=== International ===
Year	Team	Event	Result	GP	G	A	Pts	PIM
2016	Canada Red	U17	6th	5	0	0	0	2
2017	Canada	IH18	1st place, gold medalist(s)	5	0	3	3	0
2019	Canada	WJC	6th	5	1	0	1	2
2025	Canada	WC	5th	8	1	3	4	0
Junior totals				15	1	3	4	4
Senior totals				8	1	3	4	0

== Awards and honours ==
Award	Year	Ref
QMJHL
President's Cup champion	2018, 2019	
First All-Star Team	2018, 2019	
Guy Lafleur Trophy	2019	
CHL
CHL Canada/Russia Series	2017, 2018	
CHL/NHL Top Prospects Game	2018	
Memorial Cup champion	2018, 2019	
Memorial Cup All-Star Team	2018, 2019	

Awards and achievements
Preceded by Oliver Wahlstrom	New York Islanders first round pick 2018	Succeeded by Simon Holmström
