= Regina Pats =

Western Hockey League team in Regina, Saskatchewan

- City: Regina, Saskatchewan
- League: Western Hockey League
- Conference: Eastern
- Division: East
- Founded: 1917
- Home arena: Brandt Centre
- Colours: Red, white, blue
- General manager: Dale Derkatch
- Head coach: Brad Herauf
- Website: chl.ca/whl-pats

Championships
- Regular season titles: 2 (1973–74, 2016–17)
- Playoff championships: Memorial Cup; 1925, 1928, 1930, 1974; Ed Chynoweth Cup; 1974, 1980; Conference Championships; 2016–17; Abbott Cup; 1919, 1922, 1925, 1928, 1930, 1933, 1950, 1952, 1955, 1956, 1958, 1969; WJHL Champions; 1950, 1951, 1952, 1955, 1956; SJHL Champions; 1958, 1961, 1965, 1969; Saskatchewan Junior Champions; 1918, 1919, 1922, 1923, 1924, 1925, 1927, 1929, 1930, 1931, 1933

Current uniform

The Regina Pats are a Canadian junior ice hockey team based in Regina, Saskatchewan part of the Western Hockey League (WHL). Founded in 1917, the Pats are the world's oldest continuously operating major junior hockey franchise in its original location and using its original name. The team was originally named the Regina Patricia Hockey Club, after Princess Patricia of Connaught, the granddaughter of Queen Victoria and daughter of the Governor General, the Duke of Connaught. The team name also associates Princess Patricia's Canadian Light Infantry–Pats sweaters bear the regimental badge and "PPCLI" flash as a shoulder patch.

Today, the team plays in the East Division of the Western Hockey League's Eastern Conference. The Pats host games at the Brandt Centre and games are broadcast on 620 CKRM radio.

The Pats are one of the most successful junior hockey franchises. They have made a record sixteen appearances at the Memorial Cup tournament, and a record fourteen appearances in the tournament final. The teams' four Memorial Cup championships are the third most in history.

== History ==
The team was founded in 1917 and named after the Princess Patricia's Canadian Light Infantry, a Western Canadian regiment founded during the First World War. The Memorial Cup was founded as a tribute to Canadian war veterans, and the Pats earned the right to contest the first ever Memorial Cup championship in 1919, which they lost to the University of Toronto Schools. The team's first home was at Regina Arena, which opened in 1910 and could seat approximately 2,000. In 1920, the team moved to the Regina Stadium, which they would call home until 1977. In 1923, the team's name was shortened to the Pats. In 1925, the team secured its first Memorial Cup title with a victory over Toronto Aura Lee. For the 1927–28 season, the Pats merged with the Regina Falcons and called themselves the Regina Monarchs. The team went on to win the Memorial Cup that year before reverting to the Pats nickname in 1928–29. The Pats would win one more Memorial Cup title in this era, defeating the West Toronto Nationals 2–0 in 1930.

The Pats played in the Saskatchewan Junior Hockey League from 1946 to 1948, the Western Canada Junior Hockey League from 1948 to 1956, and then the revived Saskatchewan Junior Hockey League from 1956 to 1966. During the 1960s, the club was an affiliate farm team for the Montreal Canadiens.

Del Wilson, a scout for the Canadiens, became the Pats general manager in 1955; in 1966, Wilson and the Pats became central in establishing a new major junior league for western Canada, the Western Canada Hockey League. Although the impetus for the new league was creating more even footing for western teams to compete with teams in eastern Canada for the Memorial Cup, the Canadian Amateur Hockey Association (CAHA) regarded the new league as an "outlaw league" and, ironically for WCHL members, banned its teams from competing for the Memorial Cup. Because of this, the Pats returned to a once-more revived Saskatchewan Junior Hockey League in 1968. In 1970, CAHA reorganized junior hockey in Canada and finally recognized the WCHL as a legitimate major junior league, and the Pats returned to the league, which was renamed the Western Hockey League in 1978, for good. Wilson, who purchased the Pats in 1970, helped turn the team back into a national champion, as the Pats won their first President's Cup WCHL championship and fourth Memorial Cup in 1974. Wilson sold his interest in the team in 1980, the same year the team won its second President's Cup. The team remained competitive in the early 1980s, losing the WHL final in 1982 and 1984.

In 1977, the team moved from Exhibition Stadium to the adjacent and brand-new Agridome, since renamed the Brandt Centre. The team's last game at Exhibition was a 4–3 overtime win over the Swift Current Broncos in front of 2,200 fans; they opened the new arena with a 8–4 victory over the Saskatoon Blades before a crowd of 4,200.

In 2014, John Paddock joined the team as its coach and manager. The 2016–17 season, the Pats' 99th, saw the team post its first ever 50-win season and capture its second Scotty Munro Memorial Trophy as regular season champions; the team would advance to its first championship final since 1984, which it lost to the Seattle Thunderbirds. The 2017–18 season marked the 100th anniversary for the Pats, and the team held celebrations throughout the year. In addition to announcing an outdoor game at Mosaic Stadium against the rival Moose Jaw Warriors, the Pats hosted the 2018 Memorial Cup—they would go on to lose in the championship game. Although the 2018 outdoor game was ultimately moved indoors due largely to weather and ice concerns, the Pats did host the Calgary Hitmen at Mosaic as part of the 2019 Heritage Classic festivities; the game, dubbed the "Prairie Classic", saw Calgary win 5–4 in overtime.

== Championship history ==
The Pats have been western Canadian junior hockey champions fourteen times, including twelve Abbott Cup and two President's Cup victories. The Pats were also Saskatchewan junior hockey champions in 1918 before the advent of inter-provincial junior championships.

The Pats have appeared in more Memorial Cup tournaments than any other team, winning four times and finishing as the runner-up ten times. They have hosted the Memorial Cup tournament, solely or jointly, seven times: 1947, 1955, 1957, 1969, 1980, 2001, and 2018.

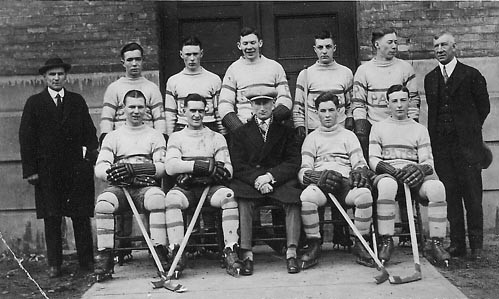
The Regina Pats, circa 1924–25.

- Memorial Cups (4): 1925, 1928, 1930, 1974
- Abbott Cups (12): 1919, 1922, 1925, 1928, 1930, 1933, 1950, 1952, 1955, 1956, 1958, 1969
- Ed Chynoweth Cups (2): 1973–74, 1979–80
- Scotty Munro Memorial Trophies (2): 1973–74, 2016–17
- WHL Division Playoff Champions (6): 1966–67, 1971–72, 1973–74, 1979–80, 1981–82, 1983–84
- WHL Conference Champions (1): 2016–17
- Regular Season WHL Division Champions (9): 1971–72, 1973–74, 1979–80, 1980–81, 1983–84, 1997–98, 2007–08, 2013–14, 2016–17

=== WHL Championship ===
- 1966–67: Loss, 1–4 vs Moose Jaw Canucks
- 1971–72: Loss, 1–4 vs Edmonton Oil Kings
- 1973–74: Win, 4–0 vs Calgary Centennials
- 1979–80: Win, 4–1 vs Victoria Cougars
- 1981–82: Loss, 1–4 vs Portland Winter Hawks
- 1983–84: Loss, 3–4 vs Kamloops Blazers
- 2016–17: Loss, 2–4 vs Seattle Thunderbirds

=== Memorial Cup finals ===
- 1919: Loss, 29–8 (goals) vs University of Toronto Schools
- 1922: Loss, 8–7 (goals) vs Fort William Great War Vets
- 1925: Win, 2–0 vs Toronto Aura Lee
- 1928: Win, 2–1 vs Ottawa Gunners
- 1930: Win, 2–0 vs West Toronto Nationals
- 1933: Loss, 2–0 vs Newmarket Redmen
- 1950: Loss, 4–1 vs Montreal Junior Canadiens
- 1952: Loss, 4–0 vs Guelph Biltmores
- 1955: Loss, 4–1 vs Toronto Marlboros
- 1956: Loss, 4–0–1 vs Toronto Marlboros
- 1958: Loss, 4–2 vs Ottawa–Hull Junior Canadiens
- 1969: Loss, 4–0 vs Montreal Junior Canadiens
- 1974: Win, 7–4 vs Quebec Remparts
- 2018: Loss, 3–0 vs Acadie–Bathurst Titan

== Season-by-season results ==
Note: GP = Games played, W = Wins, L = Losses, T = Ties, OTL = Overtime losses, GF = Goals for, GA = Goals against, Pts = Points

Memorial Cup champions	Western Canada/WHL champions	Saskatchewan champions (1918–66)

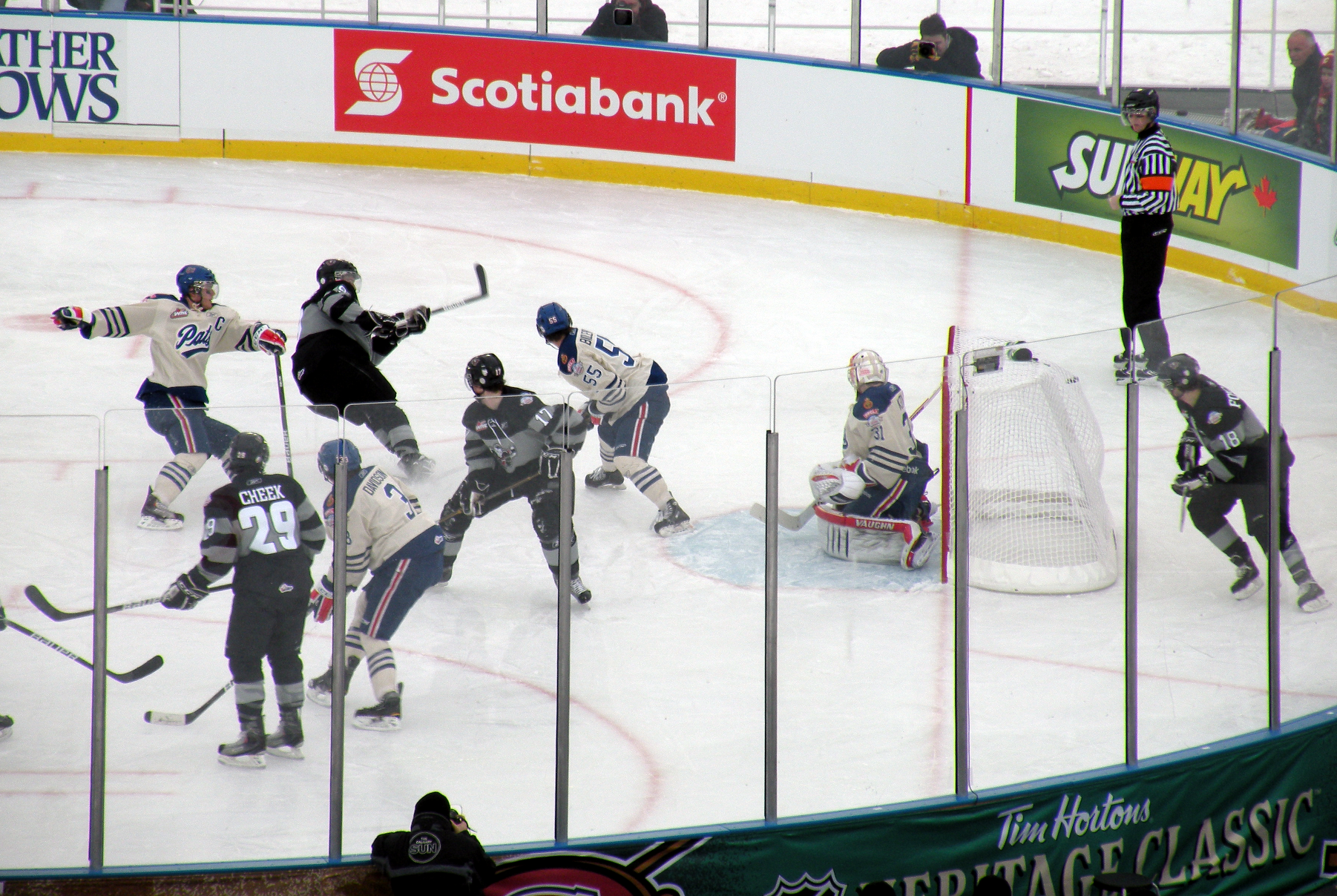
The Pats faced off outdoors against the Calgary Hitmen as part of the 2011 Heritage Classic at McMahon Stadium.

Season	GP	W	L	T	OTL	GF	GA	Pts	Finish	Playoffs
1917–18	11	10	1	0	–	96	37	–	–	Won championship
1918–19	18	14	4	0	–	164	92	–	–	Won championship and Abbott Cup
1919–20	6	1	5	0	–	33	42	–	–	Lost final
1920–21	5	2	3	0	–	14	26	–	–	Lost final
1921–22	13	9	3	1	–	56	28	–	–	Won championship and Abbott Cup
1922–23	8	5	2	1	–	78	17	–	–	Won championship
1923–24	12	9	3	0	–	56	32	–	–	Won championship
1924–25	17	16	1	0	–	120	34	–	–	Won championship, Abbott Cup and Memorial Cup
1925–26	7	4	3	0	–	25	15	–	–	Lost final
1926–27	14	12	2	0	–	56	30	–	–	Won championship
1927–28	–	–	–	–	–	–	–	–	–	Won championship, Abbott Cup and Memorial Cup
1928–29	10	9	1	0	–	49	20	–	–	Won championship
1929–30	11	11	0	0	–	36	5	–	–	Won championship, Abbott Cup and Memorial Cup
1930–31	14	12	1	1	–	42	8	–	–	Won championship
1931–32	10	8	1	1	–	40	3	–	–	Lost final
1932–33	19	13	3	3	–	55	15	–	–	Won championship and Abbott Cup
1933–34	9	5	2	2	–	34	14	–	–	Lost final
1946–47	30	26	4	0	–	201	82	49	1st SJHL	Lost final
1947–48	28	20	8	0	–	183	107	40	2nd SJHL	Lost final
1948–49	26	11	14	1	–	99	126	40	3rd WCJHL	Lost semifinal
1949–50	40	19	20	1	–	182	182	39	3rd WCJHL	Won championship and Abbott Cup
1950–51	40	26	12	2	–	207	126	54	2nd WCJHL	Won championship
1951–52	44	30	11	3	–	229	127	63	1st WCJHL	Won championship and Abbott Cup
1952–53	30	23	11	2	–	165	135	48	2nd WCJHL	Lost semifinal
1953–54	36	23	13	0	–	182	119	39	2nd WCJHL	Lost final
1954–55	40	30	10	0	–	220	116	60	1st WCJHL	Won championship and Abbott Cup
1955–56	36	24	11	1	–	181	132	49	1st WCJHL	Won championship and Abbott Cup
1956–57	51	32	16	3	–	225	163	67	2nd SJHL	Lost semifinal
1957–58	51	36	12	3	–	246	160	75	1st SJHL	Won championship and Abbott Cup
1958–59	48	27	17	4	–	162	139	58	3rd SJHL	Lost semifinal
1959–60	59	36	17	6	–	234	142	79	2nd SJHL	Lost final
1960–61	60	38	17	5	–	282	177	81	1st SJHL	Won championship
1961–62	56	33	16	7	–	237	156	73	2nd SJHL	Lost final
1962–63	54	22	24	8	–	210	195	52	5th SJHL	Lost quarterfinal
1963–64	62	31	22	9	–	332	249	71	2nd SJHL	Lost semifinal
1964–65	56	38	10	8	–	314	195	84	1st SJHL	Won championship
1965–66	60	28	25	7	–	312	260	63	5th SJHL	Lost quarterfinal
1966–67	56	31	18	7	–	324	230	69	3rd Overall	Lost final
1967–68	60	29	23	8	–	246	237	64	5th Overall	Lost quarterfinal
1968–69	42	32	9	1	–	262	129	65	1st SJHL	Won championship and Abbott Cup
1969–70	35	21	13	1	–	175	126	43	2nd SJHL	Lost Final
1970–71	66	28	36	2	–	202	246	58	4th East	Lost quarterfinal
1971–72	68	43	23	2	–	287	225	88	1st East	Lost final
1972–73	68	30	28	10	–	294	270	70	3rd East	Lost quarterfinal
1973–74	68	43	14	11	–	377	225	97	1st East	Won President's Cup and Memorial Cup
1974–75	70	29	36	5	–	260	288	63	3rd East	Lost semifinal
1975–76	72	22	42	8	–	278	347	52	5th East	Lost preliminary
1976–77	72	8	53	11	–	218	464	27	4th East	Did not qualify
1977–78	72	29	38	5	–	363	405	63	3rd East	Lost East Division final
1978–79	72	18	47	7	–	297	481	43	4th East	Did not qualify
1979–80	72	47	24	1	–	429	311	95	1st East	Won President's Cup
1980–81	72	49	21	2	–	423	315	100	1st East	Lost East Division final
1981–82	72	48	24	0	–	465	368	96	2nd East	Lost final
1982–83	72	48	24	0	–	397	281	96	2nd East	Lost East Division semifinal
1983–84	72	48	23	1	–	426	284	97	1st East	Lost final
1984–85	72	43	28	1	–	387	298	87	3rd East	Lost East Division semifinal
1985–86	72	45	26	1	–	384	295	91	3rd East	Eliminated in round robin
1986–87	72	31	37	4	–	332	356	66	5th East	Lost East Division quarterfinal
1987–88	72	39	29	4	–	342	286	82	5th East	Lost East Division quarterfinal
1988–89	72	23	43	6	–	306	358	52	8th East	Did not qualify
1989–90	72	34	31	7	–	332	329	75	3rd East	Lost East Division semifinal
1990–91	72	37	32	3	–	346	307	77	5th East	Lost East Division semifinal
1991–92	72	31	36	5	–	300	298	67	7th East	Did not qualify
1992–93	72	35	36	1	–	322	313	71	4th East	Lost East Division final
1993–94	72	34	36	2	–	308	341	70	7th East	Lost East Division quarterfinal
1994–95	72	26	43	3	–	269	306	55	7th East	Lost East Division quarterfinal
1995–96	72	37	33	2	–	316	284	76	3rd East	Lost Eastern Conference semifinal
1996–97	72	42	27	3	–	326	259	87	3rd East	Lost Eastern Conference quarterfinal
1997–98	72	46	21	5	–	334	250	97	1st East	Lost Eastern Conference semifinal
1998–99	72	24	43	5	–	238	312	53	5th East	Did not qualify
1999–00	72	32	29	6	5	234	255	75	3rd East	Lost Eastern Conference quarterfinal
2000–01	72	40	27	3	2	285	242	85	2nd East	Lost Eastern Conference quarterfinal
2001–02	72	40	20	4	8	252	192	92	2nd East	Lost Eastern Conference quarterfinal
2002–03	72	25	28	14	5	171	217	69	4th East	Lost Eastern Conference quarterfinal
2003–04	72	28	32	9	3	230	224	68	3rd East	Lost Eastern Conference quarterfinal
2004–05	72	12	50	4	6	154	285	34	5th East	Did not qualify
2005–06	72	40	27	1	4	236	234	85	3rd East	Lost Eastern Conference quarterfinal
2006–07	72	36	28	2	6	234	220	80	2nd East	Lost Eastern Conference semifinal
2007–08	72	44	22	4	2	217	206	94	1st East	Lost Eastern Conference quarterfinal
2008–09	72	27	39	1	5	228	265	60	5th East	Did not qualify
2009–10	72	30	35	3	4	246	278	67	6th East	Did not qualify
2010–11	72	23	39	7	3	216	312	56	5th East	Did not qualify
2011–12	72	37	27	6	2	230	214	82	4th East	Lost Eastern Conference quarterfinal
2012–13	72	25	38	4	5	193	284	59	5th East	Did not qualify
2013–14	72	39	26	4	3	257	247	85	1st East	Lost Eastern Conference quarterfinal
2014–15	72	37	24	5	6	263	238	85	2nd East	Lost Eastern Conference semifinal
2015–16	72	36	28	3	5	243	253	80	4th East	Lost Eastern Conference semifinal
2016–17	72	52	12	7	1	353	211	112	1st East	Lost final
2017–18	72	40	25	6	1	245	235	87	3rd East	Lost Eastern Conference quarterfinal Lost Memorial Cup final (Note: Qualified for the Memorial Cup as host)
2018–19	68	19	45	1	3	173	271	42	5th East	Did not qualify
2019–20	63	21	34	6	2	183	258	50	5th East	Playoffs cancelled due to the COVID-19 pandemic
2020–21	24	9	12	2	1	76	96	21	5th East	No playoffs held due to the COVID-19 pandemic
2021–22	68	27	36	3	2	240	277	59	6th East	Did not qualify
2022–23	68	34	30	3	1	262	277	72	4th East	Lost Eastern Conference quarterfinal
2023–24	68	22	40	4	2	208	300	50	5th East	Did not qualify
2024–25	68	16	44	5	3	170	285	40	5th East	Did not qualify
2025–26	68	25	34	7	2	234	289	59	4th East	Lost Eastern Conference quarterfinal

== Coaches ==
Alan Millar is the current general manager and Brad Herauf is the head coach, following the retirement of John Paddock in 2023.

== Players ==
=== Retired numbers ===
#	Player
1	Ed Staniowski
7	Jordan Eberle
8	Brad Hornung
9	Clark Gillies
12	Doug Wickenheiser
14	Dennis Sobchuk
15	Jock Callander
16	Dale Derkatch / Mike Sillinger
17	Bill Hicke

=== NHL alumni ===
- Murray Armstrong
- Dean Arsene
- Carter Ashton
- Murray Balfour
- Dave Balon
- Victor Bartley
- Sandy Beadle
- Norm Beaudin
- Connor Bedard
- Shawn Belle
- Gordon Berenson
- Dwight Bialowas
- Mike Blaisdell
- Buzz Boll
- Derek Boogaard
- Gary Bromley
- Adam Brooks
- Glen Burdon
- Kyle Burroughs
- Garth Butcher
- Lyndon Byers
- Shawn Byram
- Kyle Calder
- Drew Callander
- Jock Callander
- Les Colwill
- Barry Cummins
- Les Cunningham
- Scott Daniels
- Brandon Davidson
- Lorne Davis
- Don Deacon
- Nathan Dempsey
- Robert Dirk
- Ken Doraty
- Duke Dukowski
- Rocky Dundas
- Jordan Eberle
- Garry Edmundson
- Craig Endean
- Aut Erickson
- Ryker Evans
- Garnet Exelby
- Todd Fedoruk
- Brent Fedyk
- Dunc Fisher
- Cale Fleury
- Ron Flockhart
- Dan Focht
- Bill Folk
- Jimmy Franks
- Kyle Freadrich
- Jeff Friesen
- Stan Gilbertson
- Clark Gillies
- Dave Goertz
- Butch Goring
- Johnny Gottselig
- Dirk Graham
- Stu Grimson
- Libor Hajek
- Taylor Hall
- Kevin Haller
- Josh Harding
- Terry Harper
- Bill Hay
- Jamie Heward
- Bill Hicke
- Ernie Hicke
- Josh Holden
- Terry Hollinger
- Bruce Holloway
- Fran Huck
- Dryden Hunt
- Earl Ingarfield, Jr.
- Frank Ingram
- Barret Jackman
- Mark Janssens
- Frank Jerwa
- Greg Joly
- Petr Kalus
- Boyd Kane
- Bob Kirkpatrick
- Morgan Klimchuk
- Nikolai Knyzhov
- Kevin Krook
- Robbie Laird
- Brad Lauer
- Brian Lavender
- Jim Leavins
- Bill LeCaine
- Gary Leeman
- Jake Leschyshyn
- Ed Litzenberger
- Reed Low
- Len Lunde
- Brett Lysak
- Kim MacDougall
- Al MacInnis
- Josh Mahura
- Martin Marincin
- Nevin Markwart
- Paul Masnick
- Jim Mathieson
- Jim McGeough
- Stu McNeill
- Barrie Meissner
- Dave Michayluk
- Brad Miller
- John Miner
- Gerry Minor
- Garrett Mitchell
- Derek Morris
- Alex Motter
- Garth Murray
- Dmitri Nabokov
- Rod Norrish
- Filip Novak
- Selmar Odelein
- Colton Orr
- Greg Pankewicz
- Garry Peters
- Ronald Petrovicky
- Eric Pettinger
- Gord Pettinger
- Rich Preston
- Glenn Resch
- Jack Rodewald
- Rick Rypien
- Don Saleski
- Wally Schreiber
- Jeff Shantz
- Mike Sillinger
- Trevor Sim
- Jason Smith
- Ron Snell
- Dennis Sobchuk
- Gene Sobchuk
- Brian Spencer
- Al Staley
- Ed Staniowski
- Sam Steel
- Chandler Stephenson
- Evan Stephenson
- Todd Strueby
- Brad Stuart
- Stanislav Svozil
- Greg Tebbutt
- Colten Teubert
- Esa Tikkanen
- Denis Tolpeko
- Doug Trapp
- Rob Tudor
- Al Tuer
- Bob Turner
- Aud Tuten
- Darren Veitch
- Austin Wagner
- Gord Wappel
- Jordan Weal
- Doug Wickenheiser
- David Wilkie
- Eddie Wiseman
- Alex Wood
- Larry Wright
- Dmitriy Yakushin
- Egor Zamula

=== NHL first round draft picks ===
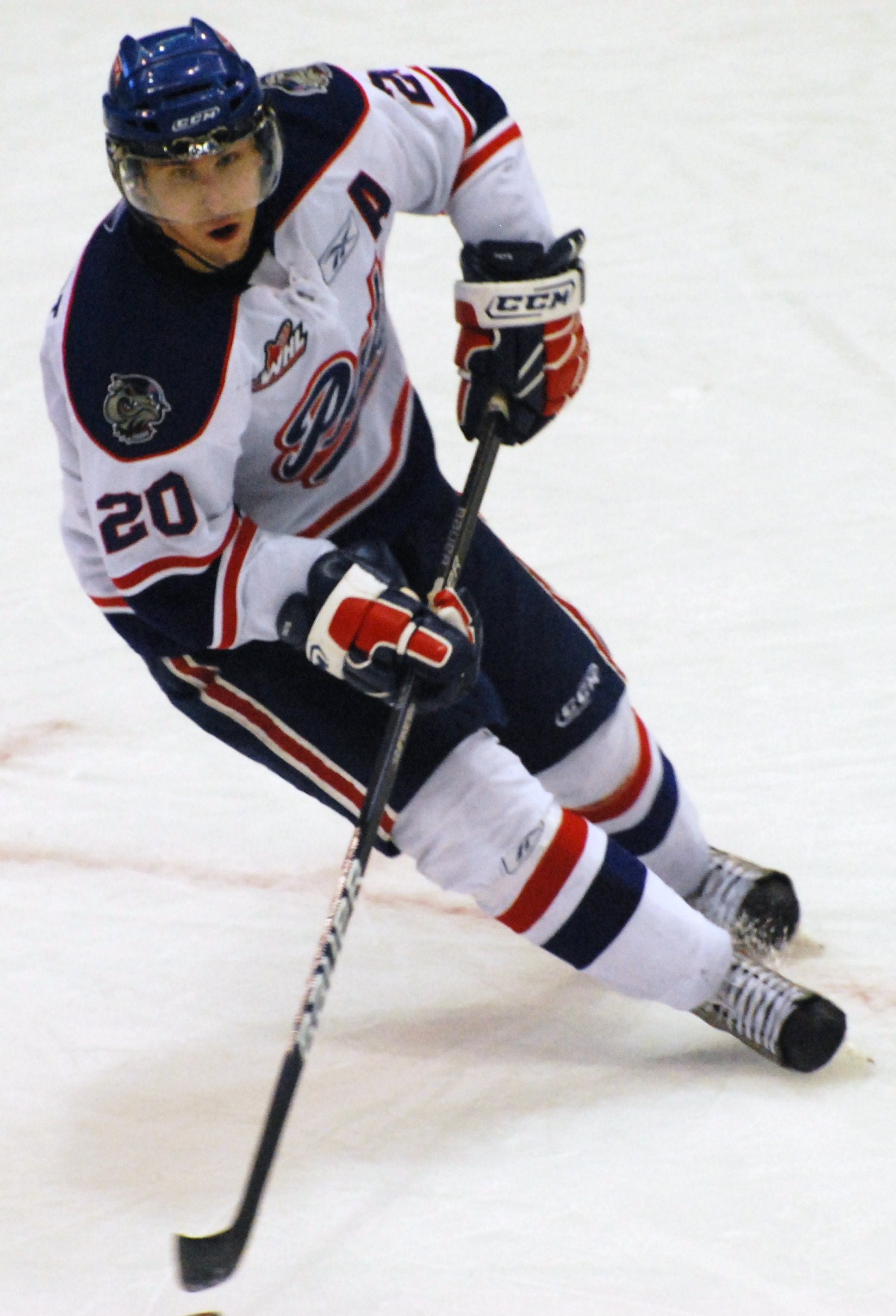
Colten Teubert, drafted 13th overall by the Los Angeles Kings in 2008.

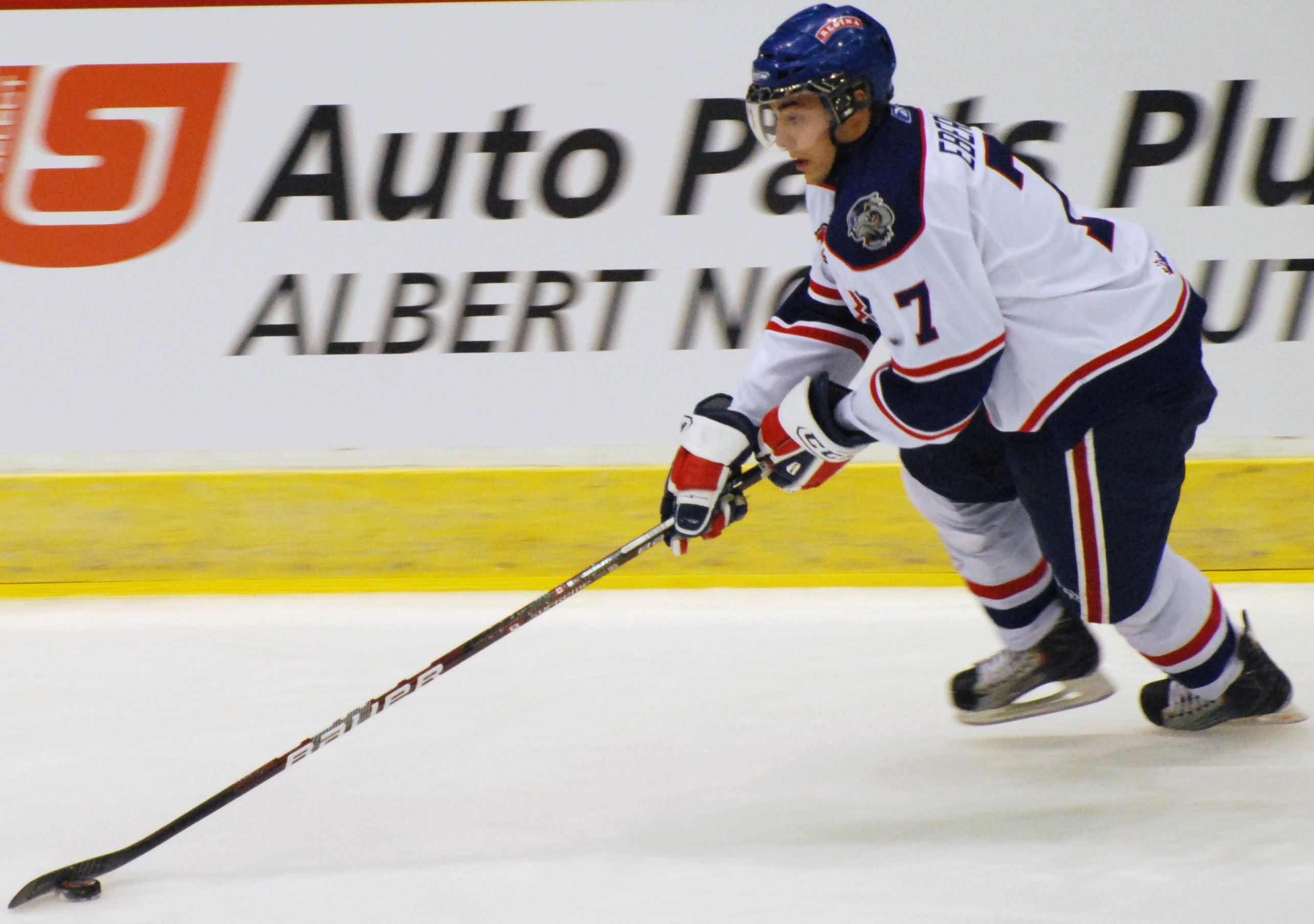
Jordan Eberle, drafted 22nd overall by the Edmonton Oilers in 2008.

- 2023 – Connor Bedard, 1st overall, Chicago Blackhawks
- 2016 – Sam Steel, 30th overall, Anaheim Ducks
- 2013 – Morgan Klimchuk, 28th overall, Calgary Flames
- 2008 – Colten Teubert, 13th overall, Los Angeles Kings
- 2008 – Jordan Eberle, 22nd overall, Edmonton Oilers
- 2007 – Nick Ross, 30th overall, Phoenix Coyotes
- 1999 – Barret Jackman, 17th overall, St. Louis Blues
- 1998 – Brad Stuart, 3rd overall, San Jose Sharks
- 1996 – Josh Holden, 12th overall, Vancouver Canucks
- 1996 – Derek Morris, 13th overall, Calgary Flames
- 1994 – Jeff Friesen, 11th overall, San Jose Sharks
- 1992 – Jason Smith, 18th overall, New Jersey Devils
- 1989 – Mike Sillinger, 11th overall, Detroit Red Wings
- 1989 – Kevin Haller, 14th overall, Buffalo Sabres
- 1989 – Jamie Heward, 16th overall, Pittsburgh Penguins
- 1985 – Brent Fedyk, 8th overall, Detroit Red Wings
- 1984 – Selmar Odelein, 21st overall, Edmonton Oilers
- 1983 – Nevin Markwart, 21st overall, Boston Bruins
- 1981 – Garth Butcher, 10th overall, Vancouver Canucks
- 1980 – Doug Wickenheiser, 1st overall, Montreal Canadiens
- 1980 – Darren Veitch, 5th overall, Washington Capitals
- 1980 – Mike Blaisdell, 11th overall, Detroit Red Wings
- 1974 – Greg Joly, 1st overall, Washington Capitals
- 1974 – Clark Gillies, 4th overall, New York Islanders
- 1971 – Larry Wright, 8th overall, Philadelphia Flyers
- 1968 – Ron Snell, 14th overall, Pittsburgh Penguins

=== Notable players ===
- Baseball great Larry Walker once tried out for the Regina Pats as a goaltender in 1983.
- Milwaukee Brewers Outfielder Nyjer Morgan had a stint with the Regina Pats in 1999–2000. He played 7 games for the Pats, registering 2 goals and 20 penalty minutes.
- MLB pitcher Dustin Molleken played a single game with the Regina Pats.

== Team records ==
Team records for a single season
Statistic	Total	Season
Most points	123	2016–17
Most wins	52	2016–17
Fewest points	27	1976–77
Fewest wins	8	1976–77
Most goals for	465	1981–82
Fewest goals for	154	2004–05
Fewest goals against	192	2001–02
Most goals against	481	1978–79

Individual player records for a single season
Statistic	Player	Total	Season
Most goals	Doug Wickenheiser	89	1979–80
Most assists	Jock Callander & Dave Michayluk	111	1981–82
Most points	Jock Callander	190	1981–82
Most points, rookie	Dale Derkatch	142	1981–82
Most points, defenceman	Darren Veitch	122	1979–80
Most goals, defenceman	Connor Hobbs	31	2016–17
Most penalty minutes	Al Tuer	486	1981–82
Best GAA (goalie)	Josh Harding	2.39	2001–02
Plus/Minus	Sergey Zborovskiy	+72	2016–17
Goalies = minimum 1500 minutes played

Career records
Statistic	Player	Total	Career
Most goals	Dale Derkatch	222	1981–1985
Most assists	Dale Derkatch	269	1981–1985
Most points	Dale Derkatch	491	1981–1985
Most points, defenceman	Darren Veitch	214	1976–1980
Most games played	Frank Kovacs	352	1987–1992
Most shutouts (goalie)	Ken Walters	11	1956–59
Most shutouts (goalie)	Art Koberinski	11	1959–61

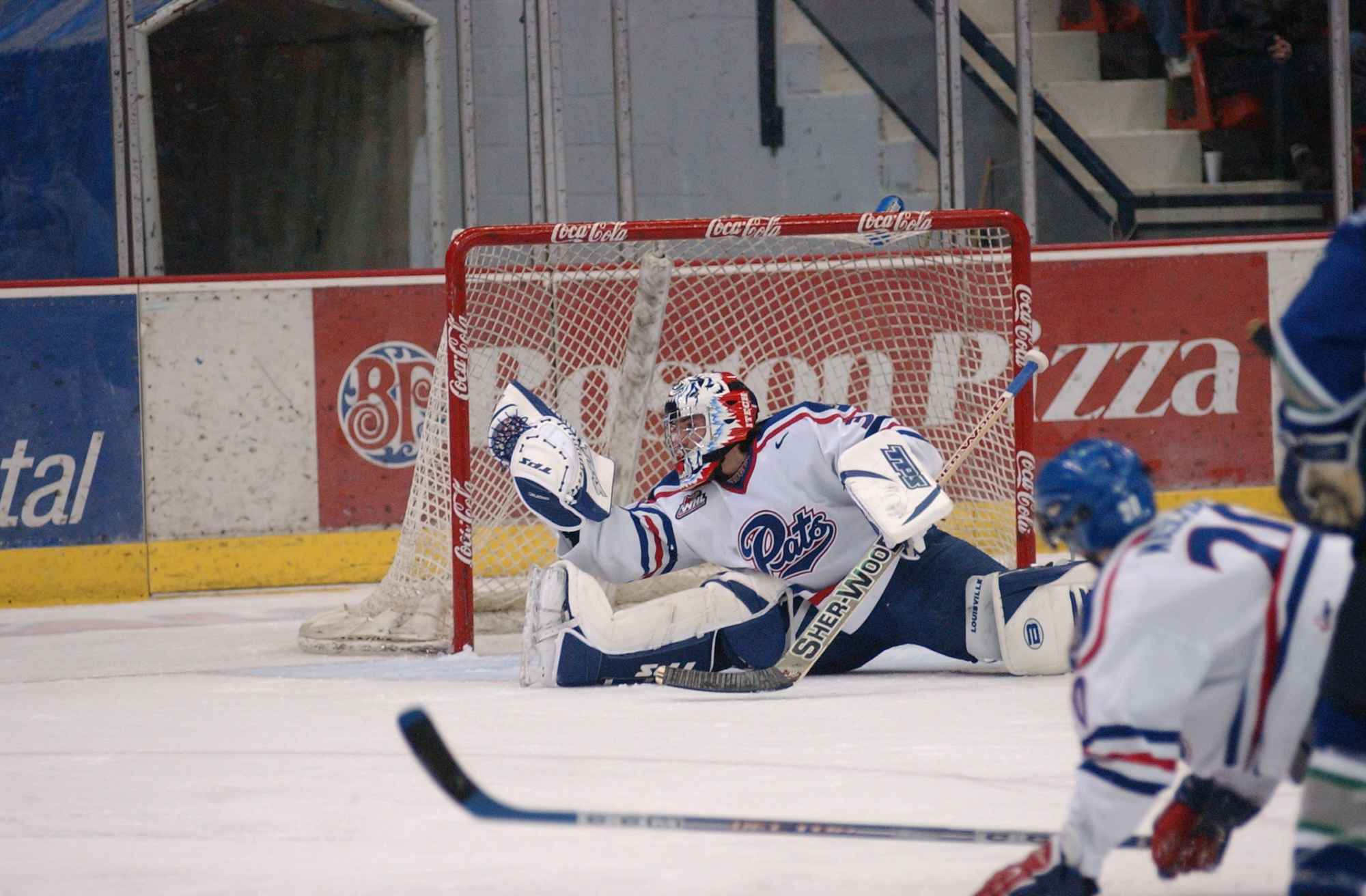
Josh Harding was named the WHL's top goaltender in 2003.

== Awards ==
Bob Clarke Trophy (WHL top scorer)

- Doug Wickenheiser: 1979–80
- Brian Varga: 1980–81
- Jock Callander: 1981–82
- Dale Derkatch: 1982–83
- Craig Endean: 1986–87 (East Division winner)
- Adam Brooks: 2015–16
- Sam Steel: 2016–17
- Connor Bedard: 2022–23

Four Broncos Memorial Trophy (WHL player of the year)

- Dennis Sobchuk: 1972–73
- Doug Wickenheiser: 1979–80
- Josh Harding: 2002–03
- Sam Steel: 2016–17
- Connor Bedard: 2022–23

Bill Hunter Memorial Trophy (WHL top defenceman)

- Gary Leeman: 1982–83
- Kevin Haller: 1989–90
- Jason Smith: 1992–93

Del Wilson Trophy (WHL top goaltender)

- Josh Harding: 2002–03

Jim Piggott Memorial Trophy (WHL rookie of the year)

- Ron Garwasiuk: 1966–67
- Dennis Sobchuk: 1971–72
- Dave Michayluk: 1980–81
- Dale Derkatch: 1981–82
- Jeff Friesen: 1992–93
- Connor Bedard: 2020–21

Dunc McCallum Memorial Trophy (WHL coach of the year)

- Earl Ingarfield, Sr.: 1971–72
- Bob Lowes: 2001–02
- John Paddock (2): 2014–15, 2016–17

Doc Seaman Trophy (WHL scholastic player of the year)

- Mark Janssens (2): 1984–85, 1985–86
- Perry Johnson: 1994–95
- Jordan Eberle: 2007–08

Stafford Smythe Memorial Trophy (Memorial Cup MVP)

- Greg Joly: 1974 Memorial Cup
- Sam Steel: 2018 Memorial Cup

Ed Chynoweth Trophy (Memorial Cup top scorer)

- Sam Steel: 2018 Memorial Cup

== See also ==
- List of ice hockey teams in Saskatchewan
- Saskatchewan Royal Connections
