= Acadie–Bathurst Titan =

Junior ice hockey team in Bathurst, New Brunswick

Acadie–Bathurst Titan Titan d'Acadie–Bathurst
- City: Bathurst, New Brunswick
- League: Quebec Maritimes Junior Hockey League
- Division: Maritimes
- Operated: 1998–2025
- Home arena: K. C. Irving Regional Centre
- Colours: Red, gold, white

Franchise history
- 1969–1971: Rosemont National
- 1971–1979: Laval National
- 1979–1985: Laval Voisins
- 1985–1994: Laval Titan
- 1994–1998: Laval Titan Collège Français
- 1998–2025: Acadie–Bathurst Titan
- 2025–present: Newfoundland Regiment

Championships
- League champions: 2 (1998–99, 2017–18)
- Division titles: 2 (2001–02, 2017–18)
- Conference titles: 3 (2000–01, 2001–02, 2017–18)
- Memorial Cups: 1 (2018)

Current uniform

The Acadie–Bathurst Titan were a Canadian junior ice hockey team in the Quebec Maritimes Junior Hockey League (QMJHL) based in Bathurst, New Brunswick. They were members of the Maritimes Division, and played their home games at the K. C. Irving Regional Centre. The Titan won the 2018 Memorial Cup and had two President's Cup championships in franchise history: 1999 and 2018.

The Titan were sold in December 2024 and relocated to St. John's, Newfoundland and Labrador for the 2025–26 season, where they play as the Newfoundland Regiment.

== History ==
The franchise was granted in 1969–70 as the Rosemont National. In 1971, they moved from Rosemont to Laval to become the Laval National, and later the Laval Voisins. In 1985, they became the Laval Titan, and in 1994, they became the Laval Titan Collège Français following a merger with the Verdun Collège Français, and then in 1998, they moved to Bathurst. The "Acadie" term in the team name refers to the city's surroundings, where the Acadian population is a majority.

The franchise has won five President's Cups, one of which (in 1999) came during the team's tenure in Bathurst. In the Memorial Cup that year, the team finished winless in the round-robin. The most famous player that has come through the organization would undoubtedly be Mario Lemieux, who was drafted in 1984 by the Pittsburgh Penguins of the National Hockey League (NHL). Lemieux played for the team during its tenure in Laval. Other famous franchise alumni include Mike Bossy, Gino Odjick and Vincent Damphousse. Notable NHL alumni from Bathurst include Patrice Bergeron, François Beauchemin, Bruno Gervais and Roberto Luongo.

In the 1999–2000 season, the Titan had the first female to be drafted by a QMJHL team, Charline Labonté, a 17-year-old Quebec goaltender who spent parts of two seasons with the team.

In 2009, the team was rumored to move to Newfoundland to replace the departed St. John's Fog Devils. At the end of the 2009–10 season, Léo-Guy Morrissette bought back control of the team from his children at their request. He retained ownership of the team through to April 2013, and local investors including NHL player Sean Couturier purchased the team. At the time of the sale, the team was reported to be worth just over $3 million.

The Titan played in the smallest market in the Canadian Hockey League, with a population of 13,424 residents. In 2018, the team won its first Memorial Cup championship, defeating the Regina Pats in the centennial edition of the tournament, coached by Mario Pouliot. After their Memorial Cup win, coach Mario Pouliot made this comment:

"Being the smallest market in the entire CHL, it's a huge accomplishment for us. Four years ago we started from the bottom and we ended up tonight with the Memorial Cup..."

In 2021, the owners tried to sell the team, but received no offers. In the same year, the city of Bathurst announced $175,000 in grants to the team. Attendance averaged more than 3,000 spectators per game in the early 2000s, but declined to 1,627 spectators per game for the 2023–24 season. Team owners had annual deficits in the thousands of dollars, but could not find a local buyer. Owners had hired Ernst & Young to conduct a search for new local ownership to no avail.

On December 16, 2024, the QMJHL approved the sale of the team to a group of investors led by Glenn Stanford, who have since relocated the team to the Mary Brown's Centre in St. John's, Newfoundland and Labrador, for the 2025–26 season. QMJHL commissioner Mario Cecchini had previously stated he would veto any sale that involving relocation, but the sale was approved when no serious offers would see the team remain in Bathurst. The team played their final game on April 4, 2025, a 5–1 loss to the Chicoutimi Saguenéens in the first round of the playoffs.

== Players ==
=== Retired numbers ===
List of retired numbers from 1969 to present.

- 1 Roberto Luongo (Acadie–Bathurst Titan, 1998–1999)
- 10 Claude Lapointe (Laval Titan, 1987–1989)
- 17 Mike Bossy (Laval National, 1972–1977)
- 19 Neil Carnes (Laval Titan, 1988–1989)
- 21 Vincent Damphousse (Laval Voisins, 1983–1985 / Laval Titan, 1985–1986)
- 22 Martin Lapointe (Laval Titan, 1989–1993)
- 28 Thomas Beauregard (Acadie–Bathurst Titan, 2002–2007)
- 30 Gino Odjick (Laval Titan, 1988–1990)
- 37 Patrice Bergeron (Acadie–Bathurst Titan, 2001–2003)
- 66 Mario Lemieux (Laval Voisins, 1981–1984)

=== NHL alumni ===
The following players have played in at least one National Hockey League (NHL) game as of the 2023–24 season:

- Ramzi Abid
- François Beauchemin
- Patrice Bergeron
- Patrick Bordeleau
- Guillaume Brisebois
- Mathieu Carle
- Jean-Philippe Côté
- Noah Dobson
- Jonathan Ferland
- Giovanni Fiore
- Ryan Flinn
- Bruno Gervais
- Jonathan Girard
- Simon Lajeunesse
- Hendrix Lapierre
- Roberto Luongo
- Daniil Miromanov
- Mathieu Perreault
- German Rubtsov
- Janis Sprukts
- Jeffrey Viel

=== NHL first round draft picks ===
List of first round selections in the NHL entry draft:

Year	#	Player	Nationality	NHL team
2018	12	Noah Dobson (D)	Canada	New York Islanders

== Season-by-season results ==
=== Regular season ===
QMJHL season standings.
OTL = Overtime loss, SL = Shootout loss

Season	Games	Won	Lost	Tied	OL	SL	Points	Pct	Goals for	Goals against	Standing
1998–99	70	42	25	3	—	—	87	0.621	315	255	3rd, Dilio
1999–2000	72	20	40	8	4	—	52	0.361	227	311	4th, Maritime
2000–01	72	29	38	4	1	—	63	0.438	239	281	3rd, Maritime
2001–02	72	45	18	4	5	—	99	0.688	257	225	1st, Maritime
2002–03	72	44	21	4	3	—	95	0.660	276	189	2nd, Atlantic
2003–04	70	18	49	3	0	—	39	0.279	184	314	5th, Atlantic
2004–05	70	18	42	7	3	—	46	0.329	163	244	5th, Atlantic
2005–06	70	43	19	—	3	5	94	0.671	291	223	2nd, Eastern
2006–07	70	35	28	—	2	5	77	0.550	291	269	5th, Eastern
2007–08	70	41	25	—	2	2	86	0.614	289	241	3rd, Eastern
2008–09	68	20	35	—	7	6	53	0.294	187	256	5th, Atlantic
2009–10	68	25	37	—	3	3	56	0.368	208	286	5th, Atlantic
2010–11	68	44	21	—	2	1	91	0.669	261	197	2nd, Maritimes
2011–12	68	32	31	—	2	3	69	0.507	250	264	3rd, Maritimes
2012–13	68	26	35	—	5	2	59	0.434	232	278	4th, Telus Maritimes
2013–14	68	22	40	—	4	2	50	0.368	144	249	4th, Telus Maritimes
2014–15	68	17	43	—	6	2	42	0.309	158	271	6th, Maritimes
2015–16	68	27	35	—	3	3	60	0.441	244	254	5th, Maritimes
2016–17	68	39	23	—	4	2	84	0.618	284	242	3rd, Maritimes
2017–18	68	43	15	—	8	2	96	0.706	270	183	1st, Maritimes
2018–19	68	8	54	—	3	2	22	0.145	141	336	6th, Maritimes
2019–20	64	12	40	—	8	4	36	0.281	171	279	6th, Maritimes
2020–21	33	21	10	—	1	1	44	0.667	146	121	2nd, Maritimes
2021–22	68	40	22	—	3	3	86	0.632	280	211	3rd, Maritimes
2022–23	68	20	40	—	5	3	48	0.353	203	278	6th, Maritimes
2023–24	68	30	31	—	3	4	67	0.493	227	243	4th, Maritimes
2024–25	64	33	28	—	2	1	69	0.539	182	212	3rd, Maritimes

=== Playoffs ===
Season	1st round	2nd round	3rd round	Finals
1998–99	W, 4–1, Cape Breton	W, 4–1, Halifax	W, 4–3, Quebec	W, 4–2, Hull
1999–2000	L, 0–4, Moncton	-	-	-
2000–01	W, 4–0, Quebec	W, 4–1, Cape Breton	W, 4–2, Baie-Comeau	L, 0–4, Val-d'Or
2001–02	Bye	W, 4–1, Quebec	W, 4–1, Cape Breton	L, 2–4, Victoriaville
2002–03	W, 4–2, Chicoutimi	L, 3–4, Halifax	-	-
2003–04	Did not qualify			
2004–05	Did not qualify			
2005–06	W, 4–2, P.E.I.	W, 4–0, Cape Breton	L, 3–4, Quebec	
2006–07	W, 4–2, P.E.I.	L, 1–4, Cape Breton	-	-
2007–08	W, 4–2, St. John's	L, 1–4, Saint John	-	-
2008–09	L, 2–4, Gatineau	-	-	-
2009–10	L, 1–4, Quebec	-	-	-
2010–11	L, 1–4, Victoriaville	-	-	-
2011–12	L, 2–4, Chicoutimi	-	-	-
2012–13	L, 1–4, Blainville-Boisbriand	-	-	-
2013–14	L, 0–4, Val-d'Or	-	-	-
2014–15	Did not qualify			
2015–16	L, 1–4, Saint John	-	-	-
2016–17	W, 4–0, Quebec	L, 3–4, Blainville-Boisbriand	-	-
2017–18	W, 4–2, Chicoutimi	W, 4–0, Sherbrooke	W, 4–0, Victoriaville	W, 4–2, Blainville-Boisbriand
2018–19	Did not qualify			
2019–20	QMJHL playoffs cancelled due to ongoing COVID-19 pandemic			
2020–21	Won round-robin tournament	L, 0–3, Charlottetown	-	-
2021–22	W, 3–2, Halifax	L, 0–3, Charlottetown	-	-
2022–23	Did not qualify			
2023–24	W, 4–0, Halifax	L, 0–4, Baie-Comeau	-	-
2024–25	L, 1–4, Chicoutimi	-	-	-

=== Memorial Cup ===
The Memorial Cup is contested annually by the champions of the Ontario Hockey League (OHL), Quebec Maritimes Junior Hockey League (QMJHL), and Western Hockey League (WHL), as well as a predetermined host team. The competition consists of a round-robin, a semifinal game, and a final game. Below are the results of every game the Acadie–Bathurst Titan have competed in.

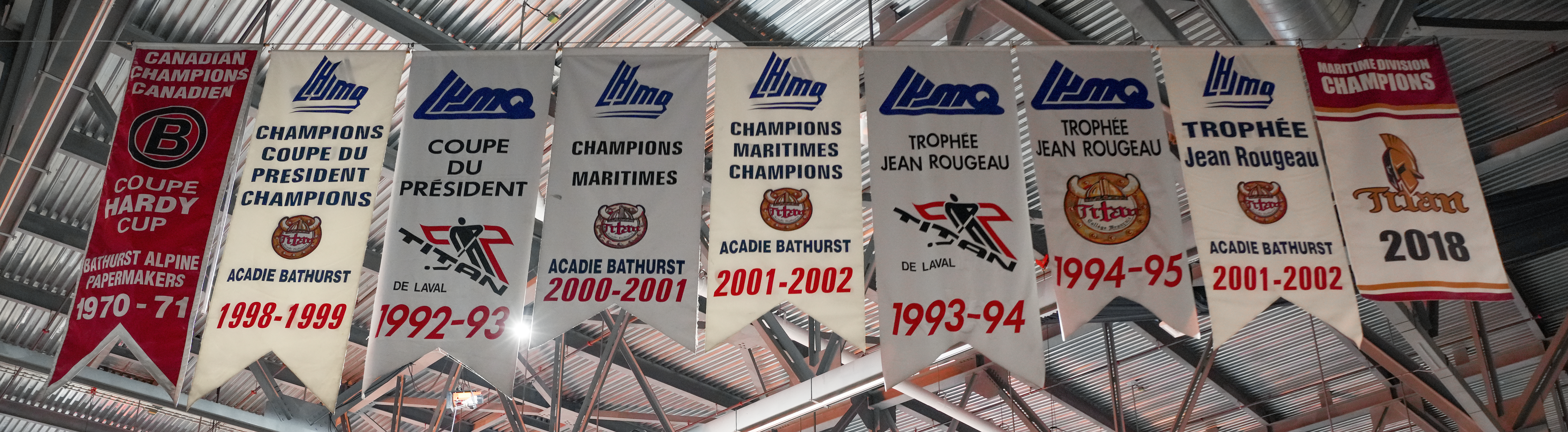
Titan banners inside K. C. Irving Regional Centre

Year	Round-robin	Semifinal	Final
1999	L, 1–5 Ottawa 67's L, 1–4 Belleville Bulls; L, 1–3 Calgary Hitmen		
2018	W, 4–3 Swift Current Broncos; W, 8–6 Regina Pats; L, 2–3 Hamilton Bulldogs	Bye	W, 3–0 Regina Pats

== See also ==
- List of ice hockey teams in New Brunswick
