= 1919 Memorial Cup =

Canadian junior ice hockey championship

The Memorial Cup trophy

The 1919 Memorial Cup final was the first junior ice hockey championship of the Canadian Amateur Hockey Association. The George Richardson Memorial Trophy champions University of Toronto Schools of the Ontario Hockey Association (OHA) in Eastern Canada competed against the Abbott Cup champions Regina Pats of the South Saskatchewan Junior Hockey League in Western Canada. In a two-game, total goal series, held at the Arena Gardens in Toronto, Ontario, the University of Toronto Schools won the first Memorial Cup, defeating Regina 29 goals to 8. It marked the only time the University of Toronto played in the Memorial Cup.

== Background ==
The University of Toronto had played a team from Woodstock in the OHA semi-final, winning the two-game total goal series. The series was marred by controversy as Woodstock claimed their equipment had been tampered with and an itching powder used on it, possibly related to gambling over the series; nothing was ever confirmed though. Toronto then played the Montreal Melvilles for the eastern championship, winning 8–2. In the West, Regina defeated the Young Men's Lutheran club of Winnipeg for the right to play in the championship.

== Games ==
Game one was played on March 19, 1919, with Toronto winning 14–3. The lopsided win had some eastern Canadian newspapers suggest that Regina should be replaced by Woodstock, both to make the series more competitive, and as an attack on the western teams, though ultimately Regina stayed.

The second game was delayed by nearly an hour and a half. There were parades in Toronto the same day — for Canadian regiments just returning home from the First World War — and fans were late to their seats because of them. Toronto won again, 15–5. The game was officiated by reporters Lou Marsh of the Toronto Star and Bill Finlay of the Winnipeg Free Press. Toronto captain Jack Aggett and Don Jeffrey led with 9 goals each over the two-game series.

== Winning roster ==
Jack Aggett, Donald Gunn, Steve Greey, Don Jeffery, Richard Kearns, Dunc Munro, Langton Rowell, Joe Sullivan. Coach: Frank Carroll
