= Jake Leschyshyn =

Canadian ice hockey player (born 1999)

- Born: March 10, 1999 (age 27) Raleigh, North Carolina, U.S.
- Height: 5 ft 11 in (180 cm)
- Weight: 196 lb (89 kg; 14 st 0 lb)
- Position: Centre
- Shoots: Left
- Liiga team Former teams: HIFK; Vegas Golden Knights; New York Rangers
- NHL draft: 62nd overall, 2017; Vegas Golden Knights
- Playing career: 2019–present

Jake Leschyshyn (/lɛˈsɪʃʌn/ leh-SIH-shuhn; born March 10, 1999) is an American-born Canadian professional ice hockey centre for HIFK Hockey of the Liiga. He was drafted with the 62nd pick by the Vegas Golden Knights in the 2017 NHL entry draft and has played for both the Golden Knights and the New York Rangers in the National Hockey League (NHL).

As the son of former Colorado Avalanche player Curtis Leschyshyn, he started his hockey career in Colorado by participating in local hockey from 2004 to 2011. He would then play in amateur hockey as a member of both the Red Deer Rebels and Saskatoon Blazers. In his junior career, he played for the Regina Pats and Lethbridge Hurricanes in the Western Hockey League (WHL), where he served as captain for the Pats.

As a member of the Golden Knights, he played for their AHL affiliates, the Chicago Wolves and Henderson Silver Knights. In October 2021, Leschyshyn made his NHL debut with the Golden Knights and scored his first NHL goal a month later. In 2023, the Rangers claimed Leschyshyn off waivers from the Golden Knights, and he has since played for both the Rangers and their AHL affiliate, the Hartford Wolf Pack.

== Early life ==
Jake Leschyshyn was born on March 10, 1999, in Raleigh, North Carolina, United States, to his parents Curtis and Laura when his father was a member of the Carolina Hurricanes. During Leschyshyn's time in Colorado, due to his father playing for the Colorado Avalanche of the National Hockey League, he started playing ice hockey in Colorado, where he participated in local hockey from 2004 until 2011, when his family moved to Grasswood, Saskatchewan, Canada. Prior to the move, Leschyshyn played with the Colorado Thunderbirds' U12 Pee Wee Major Team.

== Playing career ==
=== Amateur ===
Upon moving to Saskatchewan, Leschyshyn played his second year of minor ice hockey levels: Pee Wee AA, Bantam AA, and Midget AAA in Saskatoon. While playing with the Saskatoon Bantam AA Stallions of the Saskatchewan Midget Hockey League in the 2013–2014 season, Leschyshyn accumulated 31 goals and 28 assists. As a result of his play, the Red Deer Rebels drafted Leschyshyn sixth overall in the 2015 WHL bantam draft. Although Leschyshyn signed with the Rebels in July 2014, he was reassigned to the Saskatoon Blazers of the Saskatchewan Midget Hockey League for the 2014–15 season after attending the Rebels training camp. While with the Blazers, he scored 15 goals and 20 assists for 35 points through 38 games. On January 5, 2015, Leschyshyn's WHL playing rights were traded to Regina Pats in exchange for Connor Gay, a 2016 first-round pick, 2015 second-round pick, and 2017 seventh-round pick. Leschyshyn was called up for two games in February; the first saw him make his WHL debut, and the second saw him score his first WHL goal.

=== Major junior ===
Upon concluding the 2014–15 season with the Blazers, Leschyshyn joined the Pats full-time in March 2015 for the remainder of their games. He rejoined the Pats for the 2015–16 season and immediately made an impact with the team by scoring his first WHL hat-trick on November 27, 2015. During the 2016–17 season, he scored 17 goals and 40 points but missed the remainder of the season due to a knee injury. The Vegas Golden Knights drafted Leschyshyn as the 62nd overall pick in the 2017 NHL entry draft, and he signed an entry-level contract with the team on June 1, 2018. He attended the Golden Knights' prospect development camp but was sent back to the Pats. Prior to the 2018–19 season, the Pats named him team captain after spending the previous season as an alternate captain. During the season, Leschyshyn, along with teammate Nick Henry, was traded to the Lethbridge Hurricanes.

=== Professional ===
==== Vegas Golden Knights (2018–2023) ====
On April 4, 2019, Leschyshyn was reassigned on April 4 to the Chicago Wolves, the American Hockey League (AHL) affiliate of the Golden Knights at the time. He appeared in 3 games with the team during the 2018–19 season. During the 2019–20 season, he scored his first AHL goal on October 27 during the Wolves 4–0 shutout victory against the Manitoba Moose. He achieved his first AHL assist a month later on November 7 during a 3–0 victory against the Iowa Wild. He appeared in 61 games during the season, averaging 4 goals and 4 assists (which ended up as his total stats as a member of the Wolves).

In the 2020–21 season, Leschyshyn scored the first goal for the Henderson Silver Knights during their inaugural game as the Golden Knights' new AHL affiliate. It was his second full season in the AHL, and he finished the year with 6 goals and 11 points in 39 games. He played his first career NHL game on October 14, 2021, after Golden Knights players Mark Stone and Max Pacioretty were injured. Leschyshyn scored his first career NHL goal and registered his first career points during a 7–4 victory against the Vancouver Canucks on November 13. He started with the Golden Knights in 18 games during the first half of the season but was reassigned to the Silver Knights. He scored the game-winning goal on November 28, 2021, to help the team rally to beat the Iowa Wild, 6–5.

In January 2022, he made his first appearance back with the Golden Knights during a matchup against the Toronto Maple Leafs but was reassigned back to the Silver Knights afterwards. He was again recalled by the Silver Knights in February 2022 and appeared in 21 more games after. He appeared in 41 games with the Golden Knights during the 2021–22 season, in which he scored 2 goals and averaged 4 assists. On August 13, 2022, he signed a three-year deal to remain with the Golden Knights. He was waived by the Golden Knights for the purpose of assignment to the AHL on January 10, 2023, after not having a single point in 22 games.

==== New York Rangers (2023–2025) ====
On January 11, 2023, one day after being waived by the Golden Knights, the New York Rangers claimed Leschyshyn off waivers. He starred in 13 games with the Rangers during the 2022–23 season, where he was placed on waivers and sent to the AHL's Hartford Wolf Pack to make room for the Rangers to make a trade for Chicago Blackhawks winger Patrick Kane. In March 2023, he returned to the Wolf Pack, where he averaged 15 points—five goals and 10 assists—in 18 games, helping the Wolf Pack make the Calder Cup playoffs for the first time since 2015.

During the 2023–24 season, Leschyshyn made his only appearance against the St. Louis Blues, in which he logged 6 minutes and 28 seconds of ice time in a 5–2 loss. In Hartford, he averaged eight goals and 11 assists for 19 points through 47 regular season games. In the 2024 Calder Cup playoffs, he scored the series-winning goal against the Providence Bruins, letting the Wolf Pack win the series 3–1, sending the team to the division finals for the second straight year. He led the team in playoff goals with five in ten games and was recalled by the Rangers during their playoff run.

As a pending restricted free agent following his third season with the Rangers, Leschyshyn was not tendered a qualifying offer, ending his tenure with the organization.

==== Buffalo Sabres (2025–2026) ====
On July 16, 2025, as a free agent Leschyshyn was signed to a one-year, two-way contract with the Buffalo Sabres for the 2025–26 season. Leschyshyn played exclusively with the Sabres AHL affiliate, the Rochester Americans, while under contract with Buffalo, matching his previous season output of 13 goals for 22 points in 66 regular season appearances.

==== HIFK (2026–present) ====
As a free agent following a lone season within the Sabres organization, Leschyshyn was signed to his first contract abroad in agreeing to a one-year deal with Finnish club, HIFK of the Liiga, on August 1, 2026.

== International play ==
In 2015, Leschyshyn represented Canada internationally at the World U-17 Hockey Challenge as a member of Canada Black. He participated in the tournament, following in his father Curtis's footsteps, who had done the same in the 1986 tournament. During a matchup against the Czech Republic, he scored the game-winner in a shootout after the game went to six rounds. The tournament was his first time in international play, and he finished it with one goal and five assists in five games, including the shootout winner.

== Career statistics ==
=== Regular season and playoffs ===
			Regular season					Playoffs
Season	Team	League	GP	G	A	Pts	PIM	GP	G	A	Pts	PIM
2013–14	Saskatoon Blazers	SMAAAHL	9	2	4	6	2	—	—	—	—	—
2014–15	Saskatoon Blazers	SMAAAHL	38	15	20	35	30	—	—	—	—	—
2014–15	Regina Pats	WHL	12	3	0	3	0	9	1	0	1	0
2015–16	Regina Pats	WHL	66	7	9	16	38	12	1	3	4	8
2016–17	Regina Pats	WHL	47	17	23	40	22	—	—	—	—	—
2017–18	Regina Pats	WHL	64	18	22	40	67	7	3	2	5	2
2018–19	Regina Pats	WHL	24	16	16	32	18	—	—	—	—	—
2018–19	Lethbridge Hurricanes	WHL	44	24	25	49	30	7	6	4	10	2
2018–19	Chicago Wolves	AHL	3	0	0	0	0	2	0	0	0	0
2019–20	Chicago Wolves	AHL	61	4	4	8	20	—	—	—	—	—
2020–21	Henderson Silver Knights	AHL	39	6	5	11	38	5	0	0	0	5
2021–22	Vegas Golden Knights	NHL	41	2	4	6	8	—	—	—	—	—
2021–22	Henderson Silver Knights	AHL	34	14	13	27	24	2	0	0	0	2
2022–23	Vegas Golden Knights	NHL	22	0	0	0	8	—	—	—	—	—
2022–23	New York Rangers	NHL	13	0	0	0	0	—	—	—	—	—
2022–23	Hartford Wolf Pack	AHL	18	5	10	15	8	5	2	1	3	2
2023–24	Hartford Wolf Pack	AHL	47	8	11	19	36	10	5	1	6	2
2023–24	New York Rangers	NHL	1	0	0	0	0	—	—	—	—	—
2024–25	Hartford Wolf Pack	AHL	69	13	11	24	34	—	—	—	—	—
2025–26	Rochester Americans	AHL	66	13	9	22	22	3	0	0	0	0
NHL totals			77	2	4	6	16	—	—	—	—	—

=== International ===
Year	Team	Event	Result	GP	G	A	Pts	PIM
2015	Canada Black	U17	8th	5	1	1	2	4
Junior totals				5	1	1	2	4
