= 1987 Memorial Cup =

Canadian junior men's ice hockey championship

Tournament details
- Venue(s): Oshawa Civic Auditorium; Oshawa, Ontario
- Dates: May 9–15, 1987
- Teams: 3
- Host team: Oshawa Generals (OHL)

Final positions
- Champions: Medicine Hat Tigers (WHL) (1st title)

Tournament statistics
- Games played: 7

The Memorial Cup trophy

The 1987 Memorial Cup occurred May 9–15 at the Oshawa Civic Auditorium in Oshawa, Ontario. It was the 69th annual Memorial Cup competition and determined the major junior ice hockey champion of the Canadian Hockey League (CHL). Oshawa earned the right to host by winning a "Super Series" between themselves and the champions of the Emms Division, the North Bay Centennials. Given that Oshawa defeated North Bay in the OHL finals as well, only three teams participated that year. Participating teams were the Ontario Hockey League champion and host Oshawa Generals, as well as the winners of the Quebec Major Junior Hockey League and Western Hockey League which were the Longueuil Chevaliers and Medicine Hat Tigers. Medicine Hat won their first Memorial Cup, defeating Oshawa in the final game.

== Teams ==
QMJHL Team OHL Team/Host City WHL Team

=== Longueuil Chevaliers ===
The Longueuil Chevaliers represented the Quebec Major Junior Hockey League at the 1987 Memorial Cup. The Chevaliers were the top team in the Lebel Division in the QMJHL during the 1986–87 season, as they posted a record of 46-20-4, earning 96 points. Longueuil scored 369 goals during the regular season, ranking them fifth in the ten team league. The Chevaliers were the top defensive team in the QMJHL, allowing 259 goals. In the Lebel Division semi-final round-robin, Longueuil earned a record of 5–3, advancing to the Lebel Division finals against the Laval Titan. In their playoff series against Laval, the Chevaliers defeated the Titan in a very close seven-game series to advance to the President's Cup. In the final round, Longueuil defeated the Shawinigan Cataractes in five games to win the championship and represent the QMJHL at the 1987 Memorial Cup.

The Chevaliers offense was led by Marc Bureau, who scored a team high 54 goals and 112 points in 66 games. Mark Saumier scored 39 goals and 88 points in 50 games, while accumulating 250 penalty minutes. In the post-season, Saumier led the Chevaliers with 15 goals and 41 points in 20 games. Saumier was awarded the Guy Lafleur Trophy as QMJHL Playoff MVP. Midway through the season, Longueuil received a boost on offense, as Mario Debenedictis joined the club after beginning the year at McGill University. In 28 games, Debenedictis scored 13 goals and 29 points, while in the post-season, he scored 16 goals and 35 points in 20 games. On defense, Yves Racine emerged as a top prospect for the 1987 NHL entry draft, as he scored seven goals and 50 points in 70 games in his rookie season. In goal, Robert Desjardins was the Chevaliers starter, as he posted a 37-14-4 record with a 3.25 GAA in 57 games. Desjardins won the Jacques Plante Memorial Trophy as he led the QMJHL in Goals Against Average. He was also named the winner of the Michel Briere Memorial Trophy, given to the QMJHL Most Valuable Player.

The 1987 Memorial Cup would be the first time in team history that Longueuil would qualify for the tournament. It would also be the last, as following the tournament, the Chevaliers relocated to Victoriaville, Quebec and became the Victoriaville Tigres.

=== Medicine Hat Tigers ===
The Medicine Hat Tigers represented the Western Hockey League at the 1987 Memorial Cup. The Tigers were the top team in the East Division during the 1986–87 season, earning a record of 48-19-5, which gave the club 101 points. Medicine Hat had the third highest scoring team in the league, as they recorded 383 goals. Defensively, the Tigers tied for first with allowing the fewest goals, as they allowed 264 goals. In the East Division semi-finals, Medicine Hat defeated the Moose Jaw Warriors in six games. In the East Division finals, the Tigers won against the Saskatoon Blades in a thrilling seven-game series, advancing to the Ed Chynoweth Cup. In the championship round, Medicine Hat defeated the Portland Winter Hawks in another thrilling seven-game series to capture the WHL championship, and earn a berth into the 1987 Memorial Cup.

The Tigers offense was led by Mark Pederson, who led the club with 56 goals and 102 points in 69 games. Pederson continued to lead the team in the post-season, as he scored 19 goals and 26 points in 20 games. Neil Brady scored 19 goals and 83 points in 57 games, while Wayne Hynes scored 38 goals and 81 points in 72 games. Rocky Dundas joined the Tigers in a mid-season trade with the Spokane Chiefs. In 29 games with Medicine Hat, Dundas scored 22 goals and 46 points. On defense, Scott McCrady led the scoring, as he had 10 goals and 76 points in 70 games. Wayne McBean emerged as a top prospect for the 1987 NHL entry draft, as he scored 12 goals and 53 points in 71 games. McBean would be named a co-winner of the Bill Hunter Trophy, awarded to the Top Defenseman in the WHL. Keith Van Rooyen helped bolster the defense after being acquired by the Tigers from the Spokane Chiefs in a trade. In 45 games, Van Rooyen scored seven goals and 45 points. Dean Chynoweth also emerged as a top prospect for the 1987 NHL entry draft, as he played a very tough defensive game, scoring three goals and 22 points in 67 games, while leading the team with 285 penalty minutes. Jamie Huscroft was acquired in a mid-season trade with the Seattle Thunderbirds. In 14 games with Medicine Hat, Huscroft scored three goals and six points, while accumulating 71 penalty minutes. Mark Fitzpatrick was the Tigers starting goaltender, as he posted a 3.35 GAA in 50 games.

The 1987 Memorial Cup was the second time in team history that the Tigers competed in the event. In 1973, Medicine Hat finished in third place.

=== Oshawa Generals ===
The Oshawa Generals represented the Ontario Hockey League and was the host team at the 1987 Memorial Cup. The Generals were the top team during the 1986–87 season, as the club had a 49-14-3 record, earning 101 points, and winning the Hamilton Spectator Trophy. Oshawa was the second highest scoring club in the OHL, as they scored 322 goals. Defensively, Oshawa allowed a league-low 201 goals. In the first round of the post-season, the Generals faced the North Bay Centennials in a seven-game series to determine who would host the event. Oshawa defeated North Bay in seven games and was named the host team. In the Leyden Division semi-finals, the Generals defeated the Kingston Canadians in six games. In the Leyden Division finals, Oshawa defeated the Peterborough Petes in six games, advancing to the J. Ross Robertson Cup finals. In the final round, the Generals faced off against the North Bay Centennials for a second time in the post-season. It would be another very close seven-game series, as the Generals defeated North Bay to win the OHL Championship and move on to the 1987 Memorial Cup.

The Generals offence was led by Scott McCrory, who led the OHL in scoring with 51 goals and 150 points in 66 games, winning the Eddie Powers Memorial Trophy. McCrory was also named a co-winner of the William Hanley Trophy, awarded to the Most Sportsmanlike Player in the OHL, and the Red Tilson Trophy as the Most Valuable Player in the OHL. In the post-season, McCrory led Oshawa with 15 goals and 37 points in 24 games. Derek King was sent back to Oshawa after beginning the season with the New York Islanders, providing a boost to the offense. In 57 games, King scored 53 goals and 106 points. Lee Giffen also rejoined the Generals early in the season after beginning the year with the Pittsburgh Penguins. In 48 games, Giffen scored 31 goals and 100 points, while scoring a team high 17 goals in the post-season. Defensively, the Generals were led by Marc Laniel, who scored 14 goals and 45 points in 63 games. Petri Matikainen scored eight goals and 42 points in 50 games. The Generals goaltending duties were split by Sean Evoy and Jeff Hackett. Evoy posted a 3.14 GAA in 31 games, while Hackett earned a 3.02 GAA in 31 games. Hackett emerged as a top goaltending prospect for the 1987 NHL entry draft. Hackett was awarded the F.W. "Dinty" Moore Trophy, awarded to the OHL Goaltender with the Best Goals Against Average in their rookie season. Both Hackett and Evoy shared the Dave Pinkney Trophy, awarded to the OHL Goaltenders on the team that allowed the fewest goals.

The 1987 Memorial Cup was the ninth appearance by Oshawa. The club had previous won the Memorial Cup in 1939, 1940 and 1944. The Generals last appearance at the Memorial Cup was in 1983, where they lost to the Portland Winter Hawks in the final game.

== Round-robin standings ==
Pos	Team	Pld	W	L	GF	GA	
1	Oshawa Generals (OHL)	3	3	0	14	8	Advanced directly to the championship game
2	Medicine Hat Tigers (WHL)	2	1	1	7	7	Advanced to the semifinal games
3	Longueuil Chevaliers (QMJHL)	3	0	3	7	13	Advanced to the semifinal games

== Scores ==
Round-robin

- May 9 Oshawa 3-2 Longueuil
- May 10 Oshawa 5-3 Medicine Hat
- May 11 Medicine Hat 4-2 Longueuil
- May 12 Oshawa 6-3 Longueuil

Semi-final

- May 13 Medicine Hat 6-0 Longueuil
- May 14 Medicine Hat 3-1 Longueuil

Final

- May 15 Medicine Hat 6-2 Oshawa

=== Winning roster ===
1986-87 Medicine Hat Tigers
Goaltenders: – Mark Fitzpatrick; – Kelly Hitchins	Defencemen: – Dean Chynoweth; – Jamie Huscroft; – Kevin Knopp; – Mark Kuntz; – Wayne McBean; – Scott McCrady; – Keith Van Rooyen	Wingers: – Ron Bonora - A; – Rob DiMaio; – Rocky Dundas; – Dale Kushner - A; – Kirby Lindal; – Mike MacWilliam; – Mark Pederson; – Guy Phillips - A; – Rod Williams - A	Centres: – Neil Brady; – Wayne Hynes; – Trevor Linden; – Jeff Wenaas - A; Coach: Bryan Maxwell; General Manager: Russ Farwell

== Award winners ==
- Stafford Smythe Memorial Trophy (MVP): Wayne McBean, Medicine Hat
- George Parsons Trophy (Sportsmanship): Scott McCrory, Oshawa
- Hap Emms Memorial Trophy (Goaltender): Mark Fitzpatrick, Medicine Hat

All-star team

- Goal: Mark Fitzpatrick, Medicine Hat
- Defence: Wayne McBean, Medicine Hat; Gord Murphy, Oshawa
- Centre: Jeff Wenaas, Medicine Hat
- Left wing: Dale Kushner, Medicine Hat
- Right wing: Guy Phillips, Medicine Hat
