= Warren Babe =

Canadian ice hockey player (born 1969)

- Born: September 7, 1969 (age 56) Medicine Hat, Alberta, Canada
- Height: 6 ft 0 in (183 cm)
- Weight: 200 lb (91 kg; 14 st 4 lb)
- Position: Left wing
- Shot: Left
- Played for: Minnesota North Stars
- NHL draft: 12th overall, 1986; Minnesota North Stars
- Playing career: 1987–1991

Warren Babe (born September 7, 1968) is a Canadian former professional ice hockey left winger. He was drafted by the Minnesota North Stars in the first round with the twelfth overall pick in the 1986 NHL entry draft. He played 21 games for the North Stars in the National Hockey League between 1987 and 1990. His career was cut short after he suffered numerous concussions during his junior and professional careers.

== Career statistics ==
=== Regular season and playoffs ===
			Regular season					Playoffs
Season	Team	League	GP	G	A	Pts	PIM	GP	G	A	Pts	PIM
1984–85	Lethbridge Broncos	WHL	70	7	14	21	117	4	1	0	1	7
1985–86	Lethbridge Broncos	WHL	63	33	24	57	125	—	—	—	—	—
1986–87	Swift Current Broncos	WHL	16	8	12	20	19	—	—	—	—	—
1986–87	Kamloops Blazers	WHL	52	28	45	73	110	11	4	6	10	8
1987–88	Minnesota North Stars	NHL	6	0	1	1	4	—	—	—	—	—
1987–88	Kalamazoo Wings	IHL	6	0	0	0	7	—	—	—	—	—
1987–88	Kamloops Blazers	WHL	32	17	19	36	73	18	5	12	17	42
1988–89	Minnesota North Stars	NHL	14	2	3	5	19	2	0	0	0	0
1988–89	Kalamazoo Wings	IHL	62	18	24	42	102	6	1	4	5	24
1990–91	Minnesota North Stars	NHL	1	0	1	1	0	—	—	—	—	—
1990–91	Kalamazoo Wings	IHL	49	15	17	32	52	—	—	—	—	—
IHL totals			117	33	41	74	161	6	1	4	5	24
NHL totals			21	2	5	7	23	2	0	0	0	0

=== International ===
Year	Team	Event	GP	G	A	Pts	PIM
1988	Canada	WJC	7	0	2	2	10
Junior totals			7	0	2	2	10

Preceded by David Quinn	Minnesota North Stars first-round draft pick 1986	Succeeded by Dave Archibald
