= Wayne Hynes =

German ice hockey player

- Born: May 29, 1969 (age 56) Calgary, Alberta, Canada
- Height: 6 ft 0 in (183 cm)
- Weight: 201 lb (91 kg; 14 st 5 lb)
- Position: Centre
- Shot: Left
- Played for: NLA; SC Langnau; DEL; SERC Wild Wings; Munich Barons; Adler Mannheim; Hamburg Freezers; Hannover Scorpions
- National team: Germany
- NHL draft: Undrafted
- Playing career: 1991–2007

Wayne Hynes (born May 29, 1969) is a Canadian-born German former professional ice hockey player. Hynes competed at the 2001 and 2002 IIHF World Championships as a member of the Germany men's national ice hockey team . He also played ice hockey at the 2002 Winter Olympics with Team Germany.

== Coaching career ==
From 2007 to 2010 Hynes was a head coach in the German 2nd Bundesliga. In December 2014, his appointment as co-trainer for the Schwenninger Wild Wings was announced.

== Awards and honours ==
Award	Year
CIS Rookie of the Year (Clare Drake Award)	1989–90
CIS Player of the Year (Senator Joseph A. Sullivan Trophy)	1990–91

== Career statistics ==
=== Regular season and playoffs ===
			Regular season					Playoffs
Season	Team	League	GP	G	A	Pts	PIM	GP	G	A	Pts	PIM
1985–86	Medicine Hat Tigers	WHL	67	26	24	50	48	24	4	4	8	11
1986–87	Medicine Hat Tigers	WHL	72	38	43	81	78	20	7	8	15	26
1987–88	Medicine Hat Tigers	WHL	71	25	33	58	16	16	1	8	9	26
1988–89	Medicine Hat Tigers	WHL	72	54	81	135	66	3	0	2	2	6
1989–90	University of Calgary	CWUAA	26	27	33	60	28	—	—	—	—	—
1989–90	Canada	Intl	2	0	1	1	0	—	—	—	—	—
1990–91	University of Calgary	CWUAA	31	33	40	73	47	—	—	—	—	—
1991–92	Grefrather EC	DEU.2	27	27	36	63	36	—	—	—	—	—
1992–93	Grefrather EV	DEU.3	28	22	30	52	42	—	—	—	—	—
1993–94	TuS Geretsried	DEU.3	44	39	71	110	56	—	—	—	—	—
1994–95	SERC Wild Wings	DEL	42	13	28	41	52	5	5	4	9	2
1995–96	SERC Wild Wings	DEL	44	25	27	52	57	4	3	1	4	8
1996–97	SERC Wild Wings	DEL	48	16	33	49	48	—	—	—	—	—
1997–98	SERC Wild Wings	DEL	43	12	28	40	63	8	0	7	7	10
1998–99	SERC Wild Wings	DEL	46	14	30	44	74	—	—	—	—	—
1999–2000	München Barons	DEL	27	4	14	18	26	12	0	3	3	14
2000–01	Adler Mannheim	DEL	54	9	22	31	86	12	2	4	6	16
2001–02	Adler Mannheim	DEL	59	14	22	36	56	12	3	3	6	6
2002–03	Adler Mannheim	DEL	50	6	22	28	108	8	3	4	7	8
2003–04	Hamburg Freezers	DEL	52	5	17	22	34	4	0	0	0	6
2004–05	Hamburg Freezers	DEL	17	1	3	4	22	—	—	—	—	—
2004–05	Hannover Scorpions	DEL	34	3	8	11	20	—	—	—	—	—
2005–06	SERC Wild Wings	DEU.2	50	16	38	54	93	10	6	7	13	28
2006–07	Kassel Huskies	DEU.2	51	9	47	56	50	10	2	8	10	12
DEL totals			516	122	254	376	646	65	16	26	42	70

=== International ===
Year	Team	Event	GP	G	A	Pts	PIM
2001	Germany	OGQ	3	0	0	0	0
2001	Germany	WC	7	2	0	2	8
2002	Germany	OG	7	0	0	0	6
2002	Germany	WC	7	3	1	4	0
Senior totals			24	5	1	6	14
