= Scott Daniels (ice hockey) =

Canadian ice hockey player

- Born: September 19, 1969 (age 56) Prince Albert, Saskatchewan, Canada
- Height: 6 ft 3 in (191 cm)
- Weight: 215 lb (98 kg; 15 st 5 lb)
- Position: Left wing
- Shot: Left
- Played for: Hartford Whalers; Philadelphia Flyers; New Jersey Devils
- NHL draft: 136th overall, 1989; Hartford Whalers
- Playing career: 1990–1999

Scott Daniels (born September 19, 1969) is a Canadian former professional ice hockey player.

== Playing career ==
=== Junior career ===
A Mistawasis First Nation aboriginal, Daniels was nicknamed "Chief" by his teammates due to his full-blooded Cree Indian background. At the age of 17, Daniels started his hockey career in the Western Hockey League (WHL) playing left wing for the Kamloops Blazers in 1986, and continued to play in the WHL for the New Westminster Bruins and then the Regina Pats until 1990.

=== NHL career ===
Daniels was selected with the 136th pick in the 1989 NHL entry draft by the Hartford Whalers. After spending three years in the AHL, Daniels made his NHL debut for the Hartford Whalers on October 8, 1992, against the Boston Bruins. Known as a power forward who could put the puck in the net and protect his teammates, Daniels made an immediate impression by accumulating nineteen minutes in penalties during his debut. Daniels played in 66 NHL games for the Hartford Whalers over the span of four years before signing with the Philadelphia Flyers for the 1996–97 season. In Philadelphia, Daniels played 56 NHL games as a third of the "Dan Line" - consisting of Dan Kordic, Daniel Lacroix and Daniels - in an effort to protect star forwards John LeClair and Eric Lindros. He was later claimed by the New Jersey Devils in the 1997 NHL Waiver Draft, where he played for two years before retiring from the NHL.

Daniels played in 149 NHL games, totaling 8 goals, 12 assists, and 667 penalty minutes before retiring in 1999.

== Personal life ==
Daniels currently resides in Massachusetts with his family. His daughter, Sydney, played hockey at Harvard and was drafted fifth overall in the 2016 National Women's Hockey League (NWHL) draft.

== Career statistics ==
=== Regular season and playoffs ===
			Regular season					Playoffs
Season	Team	League	GP	G	A	Pts	PIM	GP	G	A	Pts	PIM
1986–87	Kamloops Blazers	WHL	43	6	4	10	68	—	—	—	—	—
1986–87	New Westminster Bruins	WHL	19	4	7	11	30	—	—	—	—	—
1987–88	New Westminster Bruins	NHL	37	6	11	17	157	—	—	—	—	—
1987–88	Regina Pats	WHL	19	2	3	5	83	—	—	—	—	—
1988–89	Regina Pats	WHL	64	21	26	47	241	—	—	—	—	—
1989–90	Regina Pats	WHL	52	28	31	59	171	—	—	—	—	—
1990–91	Springfield Indians	AHL	40	2	4	6	121	—	—	—	—	—
1990–91	Louisville Icehawks	ECHL	9	5	3	8	34	1	0	2	2	0
1991–92	Springfield Indians	AHL	54	7	15	22	213	10	0	0	0	32
1992–93	Hartford Whalers	NHL	1	0	0	0	19	—	—	—	—	—
1992–93	Springfield Indians	AHL	60	11	12	23	181	12	2	7	9	12
1993–94	Springfield Indians	AHL	52	9	11	20	185	6	0	1	1	53
1994–95	Hartford Whalers	NHL	12	0	2	2	55	—	—	—	—	—
1994–95	Springfield Indians	AHL	48	9	5	14	277	—	—	—	—	—
1995–96	Hartford Whalers	NHL	53	3	4	7	254	—	—	—	—	—
1995–96	Springfield Falcons	AHL	6	4	1	5	17	—	—	—	—	—
1996–97	Philadelphia Flyers	NHL	56	5	3	8	237	—	—	—	—	—
1997–98	New Jersey Devils	NHL	26	0	3	3	102	1	0	0	0	0
1998–99	New Jersey Devils	NHL	1	0	0	0	0	—	—	—	—	—
1998–99	Albany River Rats	AHL	13	1	5	6	97	—	—	—	—	—
AHL totals			273	43	55	98	1091	28	2	8	10	97
NHL totals			149	8	12	20	667	1	0	0	0	0
