= Dean Chynoweth =

Canadian ice hockey player (born 1968)

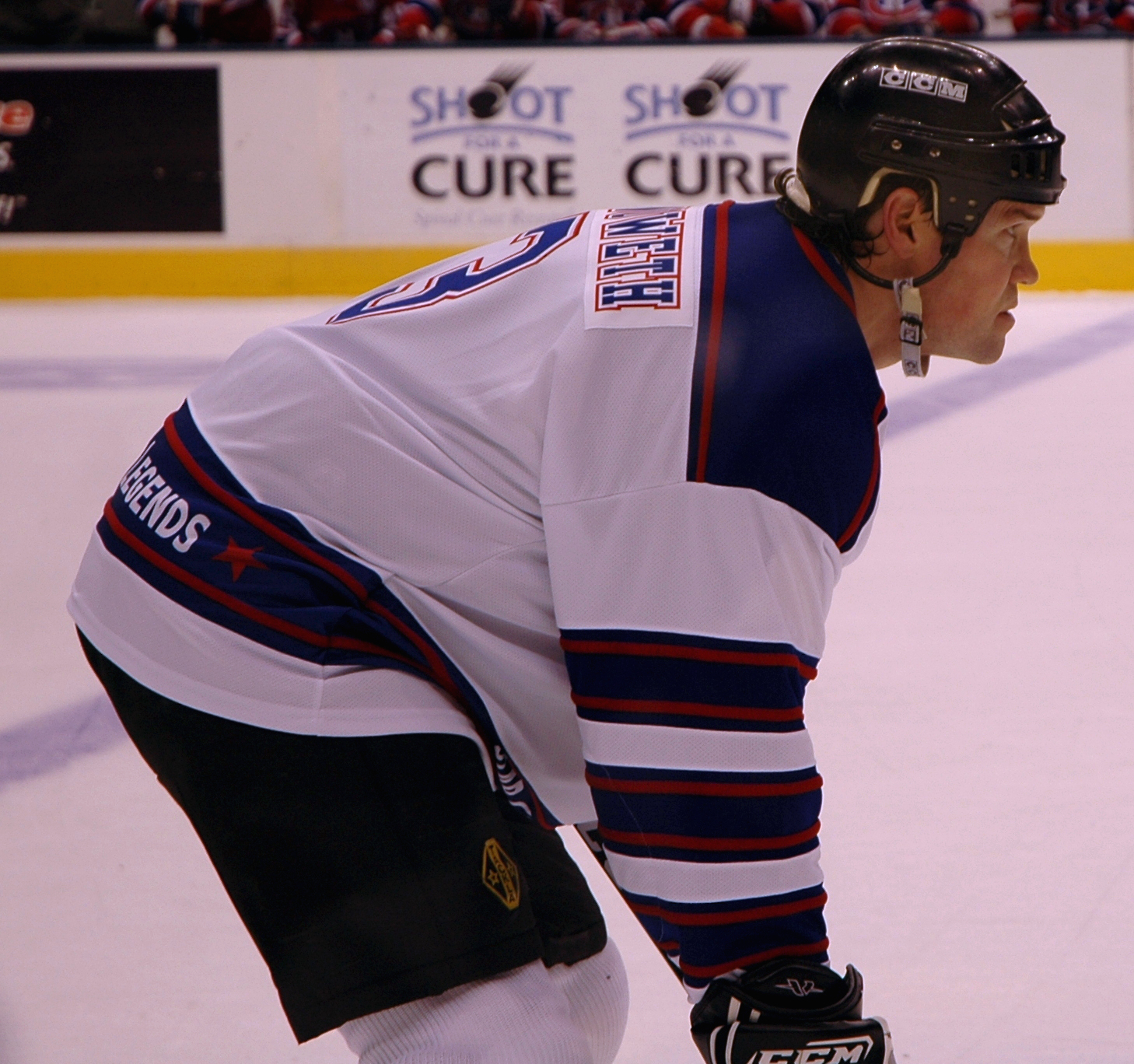
- Born: October 30, 1968 (age 58) Calgary, Alberta, Canada
- Height: 6 ft 2 in (188 cm)
- Weight: 190 lb (86 kg; 13 st 8 lb)
- Position: Defence
- Shot: Right
- Played for: New York Islanders; Boston Bruins
- NHL draft: 13th overall, 1987; New York Islanders
- Playing career: 1988–1998

Dean E. Chynoweth (born October 30, 1968) is a Canadian former professional ice hockey defenceman who played in the National Hockey League (NHL) for the New York Islanders and the Boston Bruins. Drafted 13th overall by the Islanders in the 1987 NHL entry draft, Chynoweth played 241 regular-season games in 10 NHL seasons, scoring 4 goals and 18 assists for 22 points and clocked 667 penalty minutes. He was also the head coach of the WHL's Seattle Thunderbirds. He served as the general manager and head coach for another WHL franchise, the Swift Current Broncos, from 2004 to 2011. Chynoweth was formerly an assistant coach with the New York Islanders.

Chynoweth is also the son of Ed Chynoweth, a respected former hockey executive who was on the selection committee of the Hockey Hall of Fame and was the longtime president of the WHL. Ed Chynoweth died on April 22, 2008 of cancer, aged 66. Chynoweth is an ancient Cornish name.

On June 26, 2012, Chynoweth was named head coach of the American Hockey League's Lake Erie Monsters.

On July 17, 2018, Chynoweth was hired as an assistant coach for the NHL's Carolina Hurricanes.

On July 12, 2021, Chynoweth was hired as an assistant coach for the NHL's Toronto Maple Leafs.

On June 17, 2024, Chynoweth was hired as an assistant coach for the NHL’s Winnipeg Jets.

== Career statistics ==
			Regular season					Playoffs
Season	Team	League	GP	G	A	Pts	PIM	GP	G	A	Pts	PIM
1984–85	Calgary Buffaloes AAA	AMHL	26	5	13	18	104	—	—	—	—	—
1984–85	Medicine Hat Tigers	WHL	2	0	0	0	0	—	—	—	—	—
1985–86	Medicine Hat Tigers	WHL	69	3	12	15	208	17	3	2	5	52
1986–87	Medicine Hat Tigers	WHL	67	3	19	22	285	13	4	2	6	28
1987–88	Medicine Hat Tigers	WHL	64	1	21	22	274	16	0	6	6	87
1988–89	New York Islanders	NHL	6	0	0	0	48	—	—	—	—	—
1989–90	Springfield Indians	AHL	40	0	7	7	98	17	0	4	4	36
1989–90	New York Islanders	NHL	20	0	2	2	39	—	—	—	—	—
1990–91	Capital District Islanders	AHL	44	1	5	6	176	—	—	—	—	—
1990–91	New York Islanders	NHL	25	1	1	2	59	—	—	—	—	—
1991–92	Capital District Islanders	AHL	43	4	6	10	164	6	1	1	2	39
1991–92	New York Islanders	NHL	11	1	0	1	23	—	—	—	—	—
1992–93	Capital District Islanders	AHL	52	3	10	13	197	4	0	1	1	9
1993–94	New York Islanders	NHL	39	0	4	4	122	2	0	0	0	2
1993–94	Salt Lake Golden Eagles	IHL	5	0	1	1	33	—	—	—	—	—
1994–95	New York Islanders	NHL	32	0	2	2	77	—	—	—	—	—
1995–96	New York Islanders	NHL	14	0	1	1	40	—	—	—	—	—
1995–96	Boston Bruins	NHL	35	2	5	7	88	4	0	0	0	24
1996–97	Providence Bruins	AHL	2	0	0	0	13	—	—	—	—	—
1996–97	Boston Bruins	NHL	57	0	3	3	171	—	—	—	—	—
1997–98	Providence Bruins	AHL	28	2	2	4	123	—	—	—	—	—
1997–98	Boston Bruins	NHL	2	0	0	0	0	—	—	—	—	—
1997–98	Quebec Rafales	IHL	15	2	2	4	39	—	—	—	—	—
NHL totals			241	4	18	22	667	6	0	0	0	26
AHL totals			209	10	30	40	771	27	1	6	7	84

Preceded by Tom Fitzgerald	New York Islanders first-round draft pick 1987	Succeeded by Kevin Cheveldayoff
