= Rocky Dundas =

Canadian former ice hockey right winger

- Born: January 30, 1967 (age 59) Regina, Saskatchewan, Canada
- Height: 6 ft 0 in (183 cm)
- Weight: 195 lb (88 kg; 13 st 13 lb)
- Position: Right wing
- Shot: Right
- Played for: Toronto Maple Leafs
- NHL draft: 47th overall, 1985; Montreal Canadiens
- Playing career: 1987–1990

Rocky Dundas (born January 30, 1967 in Regina, Saskatchewan) is a Canadian former professional ice hockey right winger, and now CEO of a Christian Ministry in Toronto, Ontario. He played 5 games in the National Hockey League for the Toronto Maple Leafs during the 1989–90 season. The rest of his professional hockey career, which lasted from 1987 to 1990, was spent in the American Hockey League.

== Hockey career ==
As a Junior, Dundas spent four full seasons in the Western Hockey League with three different teams. His top junior season was his third, with the Spokane Chiefs in 1985-86, when he scored 31 goals and 101 points. The trade to his third junior team, the Medicine Hat Tigers in 1987, was his most rewarding, as a result of winning the 1987 Memorial Cup championship over the favoured host Oshawa Generals at season's end.

The Montreal Canadiens selected Dundas in the third round of the 1985 entry Draft (#47 pick), and he soon found himself playing in their system with the American Hockey League's Sherbrooke Canadiens. Unable to crack the Canadiens roster during his tenure, Dundas left that organization and signed with the rival Toronto Maple Leafs as a free agent on October 4, 1989. Though most of his season was spent with their AHL affiliate in Newmarket, Dundas got to play at the NHL level with Toronto, suiting up for 5 games during the 1989-90 season. Dundas recorded one point, but registered 14 penalty minutes.

Dundas left professional hockey following the 1989–90 season to become a full-time pastor.

== Pastoral Work ==
Dundas first worked as a youth pastor at Don Valley Bible Chapel, then Bayview Glen Church, both on the northern fringe of the city. Dundas went on to become the co-lead pastor at Summit Community Church in Richmond Hill, Ontario, and later worked with World Vision Canada. In August 2025, he will assume the role of Chief Executive Office for The Scott Mission in Toronto.

== Career statistics ==
=== Regular season and playoffs ===
			Regular season					Playoffs
Season	Team	League	GP	G	A	Pts	PIM	GP	G	A	Pts	PIM
1981–82	Regina Pat Blues	SJHL	3	0	0	0	0	—	—	—	—	—
1982–83	MLAC U18	AEHL U18	38	52	46	98	122	—	—	—	—	—
1982–83	Regina Pats	WHL	1	0	0	0	0	4	0	0	0	7
1983–84	Kelowna Wings	WHL	72	15	24	39	57	—	—	—	—	—
1984–85	Kelowna Wings	WHL	71	32	44	76	117	6	1	1	2	14
1985–86	Spokane Chiefs	WHL	71	31	70	101	160	9	2	5	7	28
1986–87	Spokane Chiefs	WHL	19	13	17	30	69	—	—	—	—	—
1986–87	Medicine Hat Tigers	WHL	29	22	24	46	63	20	4	8	12	44
1986–87	Medicine Hat Tigers	M-Cup	—	—	—	—	—	5	0	2	2	11
1987–88	Baltimore Skipjacks	AHL	9	0	1	1	46	—	—	—	—	—
1987–88	Sherbrooke Canadiens	AHL	38	9	6	15	104	3	0	0	0	7
1988–89	Sherbrooke Canadiens	AHL	63	12	29	41	212	2	2	0	2	8
1989–90	Toronto Maple Leafs	NHL	5	0	0	0	14	—	—	—	—	—
1989–90	Newmarket Saints	AHL	62	18	15	33	158	—	—	—	—	—
AHL totals			172	39	51	90	520	5	2	0	2	15
NHL totals			5	0	0	0	14	—	—	—	—	—
