= Mark Fitzpatrick =

Canadian ice hockey player (born 1968)

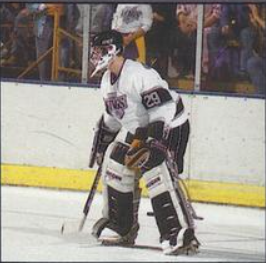
- Fitzpatrick with the Los Angeles Kings in 1988
- Born: November 13, 1968 (age 57) Toronto, Ontario, Canada
- Height: 6 ft 2 in (188 cm)
- Weight: 198 lb (90 kg; 14 st 2 lb)
- Position: Goaltender
- Caught: Left
- Played for: Los Angeles Kings; New York Islanders; Florida Panthers; Tampa Bay Lightning; Chicago Blackhawks; Carolina Hurricanes
- NHL draft: 27th overall, 1987; Los Angeles Kings
- Playing career: 1988–2001

Mark Fitzpatrick (born November 13, 1968) is a Canadian former professional ice hockey goaltender. He moved to Kitimat, British Columbia, where he started minor hockey, when he was ten years old. He won the Memorial Cup twice as a member of the Medicine Hat Tigers before going on to a professional career with the Los Angeles Kings, New York Islanders, Florida Panthers, Tampa Bay Lightning and Chicago Blackhawks of the National Hockey League (NHL).

Fitzpatrick was drafted 27th overall in the 1987 NHL entry draft by the Los Angeles Kings but only spent a season with the Kings organization before he was traded along with Wayne McBean to the New York Islanders on February 22, 1989 for Kelly Hrudey.

During his time with the Islanders, he contracted Eosinophilia–myalgia syndrome, a potentially fatal neurological disease, which cost him nearly all of the 1990-91 season. He recovered and returned to the ice in February 1992. His efforts in returning to the league after the illness earned him the Bill Masterton Memorial Trophy in 1992. On June 20, 1993, with the expansion draft for the Florida Panthers and the Mighty Ducks of Anaheim approaching, the Islanders traded him to the Quebec Nordiques for Ron Hextall and a swap of first-round picks. Four days later, the Panthers claimed him in the expansion draft.

Fitzpatrick spent five seasons with the Panthers serving as backup goaltender to fellow expansion draft pick John Vanbiesbrouck. On January 16, 1998, Fitzpatrick was traded to the Tampa Bay Lightning with Jody Hull for Dino Ciccarelli and Jeff Norton where he only managed 7 wins in 34 games for the struggling Lightning who finished the season with the worst record. Fitzpatrick was traded once more months later to the Chicago Blackhawks for Michal Sykora and spent the season in a backup capacity to Jocelyn Thibault.

He moved to Carolina Hurricanes for the 1999–2000 NHL season but spent the majority of the year in the International Hockey League for the Cincinnati Cyclones and just played three games for the Hurricanes. Fitzpatrick spent one more season in the IHL for the Detroit Vipers before retiring in 2001.

== Personal life ==
Fitzpatrick was previously married, from which he has a daughter. The marriage ended after Fitzpatrick was charged with assault and aggravated domestic battery on July 13, 1994 in Islamorada, Florida following an argument with his wife while she was seven months pregnant.

== Career statistics ==
=== Regular season and playoffs ===
			Regular season									Playoffs
Season	Team	League	GP	W	L	T	MIN	GA	SO	GAA	SV%	GP	W	L	MIN	GA	SO	GAA	SV%
1983–84	Revelstoke Rangers	BCHL	21	—	—	—	1019	90	0	5.30	—	—	—	—	—	—	—	—	—
1984–85	Calgary Canucks	AJHL	29	18	8	0	1631	102	2	3.75	—	—	—	—	—	—	—	—	—
1984–85	Medicine Hat Tigers	WHL	3	1	2	0	180	9	0	3.00	—	1	0	0	20	2	0	6.00	—
1985–86	Medicine Hat Tigers	WHL	41	26	6	1	2074	99	1	2.86	—	19	11	5	986	58	0	3.53	—
1986–87	Medicine Hat Tigers	WHL	50	31	11	4	2844	159	4	3.35	—	20	12	8	1224	71	1	3.48	—
1986–87	Medicine Hat Tigers	M-Cup	—	—	—	—	—	—	—	—	—	5	4	1	300	10	1	2.00	—
1987–88	Medicine Hat Tigers	WHL	63	36	15	6	3600	194	2	3.23	—	16	12	4	959	52	1	3.25	—
1987–88	Medicine Hat Tigers	M-Cup	—	—	—	—	—	—	—	—	—	5	4	1	280	17	0	3.64	—
1988–89	Los Angeles Kings	NHL	17	6	7	3	957	64	0	4.01	.887	—	—	—	—	—	—	—	—
1988–89	New Haven Nighthawks	AHL	18	10	5	1	980	54	1	3.31	—	—	—	—	—	—	—	—	—
1988–89	New York Islanders	NHL	11	3	5	2	627	41	0	3.92	.869	—	—	—	—	—	—	—	—
1989–90	New York Islanders	NHL	47	19	19	5	2653	150	3	3.39	.898	4	0	2	152	13	0	5.13	.817
1990–91	New York Islanders	NHL	2	1	1	0	120	6	0	3.00	.900	—	—	—	—	—	—	—	—
1990–91	Capital District Islanders	AHL	12	3	7	2	734	47	0	3.84	—	—	—	—	—	—	—	—	—
1991–92	New York Islanders	NHL	30	11	13	5	1743	93	0	3.20	.902	—	—	—	—	—	—	—	—
1991–92	Capital District Islanders	AHL	14	6	5	1	782	39	0	2.99	—	—	—	—	—	—	—	—	—
1992–93	New York Islanders	NHL	39	17	15	5	2253	130	0	3.46	.878	3	0	1	77	4	0	3.12	.826
1992–93	Capital District Islanders	AHL	5	1	3	1	284	18	0	3.80	—	—	—	—	—	—	—	—	—
1993–94	Florida Panthers	NHL	28	12	8	6	1603	73	1	2.73	.914	—	—	—	—	—	—	—	—
1994–95	Florida Panthers	NHL	15	6	7	2	819	36	2	2.64	.900	—	—	—	—	—	—	—	—
1995–96	Florida Panthers	NHL	34	15	11	3	1786	88	0	2.96	.891	2	0	0	60	6	0	6.00	.800
1996–97	Florida Panthers	NHL	30	8	9	9	1680	66	0	2.36	.914	—	—	—	—	—	—	—	—
1997–98	Florida Panthers	NHL	12	2	7	2	640	32	1	3.00	.879	—	—	—	—	—	—	—	—
1997–98	Fort Wayne Komets	IHL	2	1	1	0	119	8	0	4.03	.857	—	—	—	—	—	—	—	—
1997–98	Tampa Bay Lightning	NHL	34	7	24	1	1938	102	1	3.16	.895	—	—	—	—	—	—	—	—
1998–99	Chicago Blackhawks	NHL	27	6	8	6	1403	64	0	2.74	.906	—	—	—	—	—	—	—	—
1999–2000	Carolina Hurricanes	NHL	3	0	2	0	107	8	0	4.49	.882	—	—	—	—	—	—	—	—
1999–2000	Cincinnati Cyclones	IHL	24	11	11	1	1379	59	4	2.57	.916	—	—	—	—	—	—	—	—
2000–01	Detroit Vipers	IHL	9	4	4	0	485	21	0	2.60	.919	—	—	—	—	—	—	—	—
NHL totals			329	113	136	49	18,329	953	8	3.12	.896	9	0	3	289	23	0	4.78	.815
AHL totals			49	20	20	5	2780	158	1	3.41	—	—	—	—	—	—	—	—	—
IHL totals			35	16	16	1	1983	88	4	2.66	.913	—	—	—	—	—	—	—	—

== Awards ==
- WHL East Second All-Star Team – 1986 & 1988

Preceded by Dave Taylor	Winner of the Bill Masterton Memorial Trophy; 1992	Succeeded by Mario Lemieux
