= Dale Kushner =

Canadian ice hockey player

- Born: June 13, 1966 (age 59) Terrace, British Columbia, Canada
- Height: 6 ft 1 in (185 cm)
- Weight: 195 lb (88 kg; 13 st 13 lb)
- Position: Right wing
- Shot: Left
- Played for: New York Islanders; Philadelphia Flyers
- NHL draft: Undrafted
- Playing career: 1987–1996

Dale T. Kushner (born June 13, 1966) is a Canadian former professional ice hockey player. He played in the National Hockey League (NHL) with the New York Islanders and Philadelphia Flyers.

== Career statistics ==
			Regular season					Playoffs
Season	Team	League	GP	G	A	Pts	PIM	GP	G	A	Pts	PIM
1983–84	Fort McMurray Oil Barons	AJHL	44	15	6	21	139	—	—	—	—	—
1983–84	Prince Albert Raiders	WHL	1	0	0	0	5	—	—	—	—	—
1984–85	Prince Albert Raiders	WHL	2	0	0	0	2	—	—	—	—	—
1984–85	Moose Jaw Warriors	WHL	17	5	2	7	23	—	—	—	—	—
1984–85	Medicine Hat Tigers	WHL	48	23	17	40	173	10	3	3	6	18
1985–86	Medicine Hat Tigers	WHL	66	25	19	44	218	25	0	5	5	114
1986–87	Medicine Hat Tigers	WHL	63	34	34	68	250	20	8	13	21	57
1987–88	Springfield Indians	AHL	68	13	23	36	201	—	—	—	—	—
1988–89	Springfield Indians	AHL	45	5	8	13	132	—	—	—	—	—
1989–90	New York Islanders	NHL	2	0	0	0	2	—	—	—	—	—
1989–90	Springfield Indians	AHL	45	14	11	25	163	7	2	3	5	61
1990–91	Philadelphia Flyers	NHL	63	7	11	18	195	—	—	—	—	—
1990–91	Hershey Bears	AHL	5	3	4	7	14	—	—	—	—	—
1991–92	Philadelphia Flyers	NHL	19	3	2	5	18	—	—	—	—	—
1991–92	Hershey Bears	AHL	46	9	7	16	98	6	0	2	2	23
1992–93	Hershey Bears	AHL	26	1	7	8	98	—	—	—	—	—
1992–93	Capital District Islanders	AHL	7	0	1	1	29	2	1	0	1	29
1993–94	Saint John Flames	AHL	73	20	17	37	199	7	2	1	3	28
1994–95	Saint John Flames	AHL	38	13	10	23	97	5	0	3	3	14
1995–96	Michigan K-Wings	IHL	49	5	12	17	108	6	0	0	0	20
NHL totals			84	10	13	23	215	—	—	—	—	—
AHL totals			353	78	88	166	1,031	27	5	9	14	155
