= Wayne McBean =

Canadian ice hockey player (born 1969)

- Born: February 21, 1969 (age 57) Calgary, Alberta, Canada
- Height: 6 ft 2 in (188 cm)
- Weight: 190 lb (86 kg; 13 st 8 lb)
- Position: Defence
- Shot: Left
- Played for: Los Angeles Kings; New York Islanders; Winnipeg Jets
- NHL draft: 4th overall, 1987; Los Angeles Kings
- Playing career: 1987–1994

Wayne A. "Beaner" McBean (born February 21, 1969) is a Canadian former professional ice hockey defenceman. McBean played professionally in the National Hockey League (NHL) with the Los Angeles Kings, New York Islanders, and Winnipeg Jets.

== Playing career ==
During his junior career, McBean played in the WHL for Medicine Hat Tigers, notably accumulating 85 assists over three years. He was also a member of two Memorial Cup-winning teams in 1987 and 1988. In 1987, he was named to the WHL East first All-Star team and the Memorial Cup All-Star team and was the recipient of the Stafford Smythe Memorial Trophy as the tournament MVP. In 1988 McBean played for Canada in the World Junior Championship, winning a gold medal.

He was selected by the Los Angeles Kings 4th in the 1st round of the 1987 NHL entry draft. On February 22, 1989, Wayne was traded from the Los Angeles Kings with Mark Fitzpatrick and future considerations to the New York Islanders for goaltender Kelly Hrudey and Yan Kaminsky, but spent the bulk of his time in the minor leagues, recording the assist on the Calder Cup championship winning goal for the Isles' American Hockey League affiliate Springfield Indians in 1990. He retired in 1994 after sustaining a wrist injury.

== Career statistics ==
=== Regular season and playoffs ===
			Regular season					Playoffs
Season	Team	League	GP	G	A	Pts	PIM	GP	G	A	Pts	PIM
1985–86	Medicine Hat Tigers	WHL	67	1	14	15	73	25	1	5	6	36
1986–87	Medicine Hat Tigers	WHL	71	12	41	53	163	20	2	8	10	40
1987–88	Los Angeles Kings	NHL	27	0	1	1	26	—	—	—	—	—
1987–88	Medicine Hat Tigers	WHL	30	15	30	45	48	16	6	17	23	50
1988–89	New Haven Nighthawks	AHL	7	1	1	2	2	—	—	—	—	—
1988–89	Los Angeles Kings	NHL	33	0	5	5	23	—	—	—	—	—
1988–89	New York Islanders	NHL	19	0	1	1	12	—	—	—	—	—
1989–90	Springfield Indians	AHL	68	6	33	39	48	17	4	11	15	31
1989–90	New York Islanders	NHL	5	0	1	1	2	2	1	1	2	0
1990–91	Capital District Islanders	AHL	22	9	9	18	19	—	—	—	—	—
1990–91	New York Islanders	NHL	52	5	14	19	47	—	—	—	—	—
1991–92	New York Islanders	NHL	25	2	4	6	18	—	—	—	—	—
1992–93	Capital District Islanders	AHL	20	1	9	10	35	3	0	1	1	9
1993–94	Salt Lake Golden Eagles	IHL	5	0	6	6	2	—	—	—	—	—
1993–94	New York Islanders	NHL	19	1	4	5	16	—	—	—	—	—
1993–94	Winnipeg Jets	NHL	31	2	9	11	24	—	—	—	—	—
NHL totals			211	10	39	49	168	2	1	1	2	0
AHL totals			117	17	52	69	104	20	4	12	16	40

=== International ===
Year	Team	Event	GP	G	A	Pts	PIM
1988	Canada	WJC	7	1	0	1	2

== Awards ==
- WHL East First All-Star Team – 1987

Preceded by Jimmy Carson	Los Angeles Kings first-round draft pick 1987	Succeeded by Martin Gélinas
