= Neil Brady =

Canadian ice hockey player (born 1968)

- Born: April 12, 1968 (age 58) Montreal, Quebec, Canada
- Height: 6 ft 2 in (188 cm)
- Weight: 200 lb (91 kg; 14 st 4 lb)
- Position: Centre
- Shot: Left
- Played for: New Jersey Devils; Ottawa Senators; Dallas Stars
- NHL draft: 3rd overall, 1986; New Jersey Devils
- Playing career: 1988–2001

Neil Patrick Brady (born April 12, 1968) is a Canadian former professional ice hockey player. He is best known for scoring the first goal in the history of the contemporary Ottawa Senators franchise on October 8, 1992.

== Playing career ==
Brady enjoyed an exemplary junior hockey career in the WHL with the Medicine Hat Tigers. After scoring 81 points in 72 games and registering over 100 penalty minutes in 1985–86, Brady was chosen third overall by the New Jersey Devils in the 1986 NHL entry draft. He was returned to junior, then turned pro with the AHL's Utica Devils in 1988–89. He made his NHL debut on October 5, 1989.

After just 29 games in 3 seasons in which Brady struggled with his confidence, the Devils organization gave up on him, and he was traded to the expansion Ottawa Senators for future considerations on September 3, 1992. Brady found early success in Ottawa, scoring the first goal for the modern-day Ottawa Senators franchise in both the pre-season, against the Hartford Whalers and the regular season against Montreal goaltender Patrick Roy. He went on to score 7 goals and 17 assists for 24 points during the 1992–93 season. Though these numbers were the best of his NHL career, they were nowhere near the standards he set at the junior level.

Brady fell out of favour with the Senators organization, and was signed as a free agent by the Dallas Stars in December, 1993, though he was chiefly a farmhand for his new team. In total, Brady played in 89 NHL games, scoring 9 goals and 22 assists for 31 points and 95 penalty minutes. Brady spent the remainder of his career in the now-defunct International Hockey League. He retired in 2001 after the league folded.

== Personal ==
- Brady currently lives and works in Calgary, Alberta.

== Career statistics ==
			Regular season					Playoffs
Season	Team	League	GP	G	A	Pts	PIM	GP	G	A	Pts	PIM
1984–85	Calgary Northstars AAA	AMHL	37	25	50	75	75	—	—	—	—	—
1984–85	Medicine Hat Tigers	WHL	—	—	—	—	—	3	0	0	0	2
1985–86	Medicine Hat Tigers	WHL	72	21	60	81	104	21	9	11	20	23
1986–87	Medicine Hat Tigers	WHL	57	19	64	83	126	18	1	4	5	25
1987–88	Medicine Hat Tigers	WHL	61	16	35	51	110	15	0	3	3	19
1988–89	Utica Devils	AHL	75	16	21	37	56	4	0	3	3	0
1989–90	Utica Devils	AHL	38	10	13	23	21	5	0	1	1	10
1989–90	New Jersey Devils	NHL	19	1	4	5	13	—	—	—	—	—
1990–91	Utica Devils	AHL	77	33	63	96	91	—	—	—	—	—
1990–91	New Jersey Devils	NHL	3	0	0	0	0	—	—	—	—	—
1991–92	Utica Devils	AHL	33	12	30	42	28	—	—	—	—	—
1991–92	New Jersey Devils	NHL	7	1	0	1	4	—	—	—	—	—
1992–93	New Haven Senators	AHL	8	6	3	9	2	—	—	—	—	—
1992–93	Ottawa Senators	NHL	55	7	17	24	57	—	—	—	—	—
1993–94	Kalamazoo Wings	IHL	43	10	16	26	188	5	1	1	2	10
1993–94	Dallas Stars	NHL	5	0	1	1	21	—	—	—	—	—
1994–95	Kalamazoo Wings	IHL	70	13	45	58	140	15	5	14	19	22
1995–96	Michigan K-Wings	IHL	61	14	20	34	127	10	1	4	5	8
1996–97	Michigan K-Wings	IHL	76	13	20	33	62	4	1	0	1	0
1997–98	Houston Aeros	IHL	65	9	26	35	56	4	2	0	2	34
1998–99	Manitoba Moose	IHL	13	1	5	6	8	—	—	—	—	—
1999–2000	Utah Grizzlies	IHL	82	14	36	50	129	3	0	0	0	2
2000–01	Utah Grizzlies	IHL	26	0	4	4	34	—	—	—	—	—
2000–01	Chicago Wolves	IHL	24	1	1	2	12	—	—	—	—	—
NHL totals			89	9	22	31	95	—	—	—	—	—
AHL totals			231	77	130	207	198	9	0	4	4	10
IHL totals			460	75	173	248	756	41	10	19	29	76

Preceded by Craig Wolanin	New Jersey Devils first-round draft pick 1986	Succeeded by Brendan Shanahan
