= Dave Archibald =

Canadian ice hockey player and coach

- Born: April 14, 1969 (age 57) Chilliwack, British Columbia, Canada
- Height: 6 ft 1 in (185 cm)
- Weight: 202 lb (92 kg; 14 st 6 lb)
- Position: Right wing
- Shot: Left
- Played for: Minnesota North Stars; New York Rangers; Ottawa Senators; New York Islanders; Frankfurt Lions; Linköpings HC
- National team: Canada
- NHL draft: 6th overall, 1987; Minnesota North Stars
- Playing career: 1987–2000

David J. Archibald (born April 14, 1969) is a Canadian professional ice hockey coach and former player. Archibald played for the Minnesota North Stars, New York Rangers, Ottawa Senators, and New York Islanders of the National Hockey League (NHL).

== Playing career ==
After playing four seasons in the Western Hockey League for the Portland Winter Hawks, Archibald was drafted by the Minnesota North Stars in the first round, sixth overall, of the 1987 NHL entry draft. He made his NHL debut with the North Stars in the 1987–88 season. He scored two goals in his NHL debut on October 10, 1987, and at 18 years, 179 days old remains the youngest player in North Stars franchise history to score in his debut. In his first two NHL seasons, he scored 27 goals and added 39 assists. Early in the 1989–90 season, the North Stars traded Archibald to the New York Rangers for defenceman Jayson More.

Archibald finished the 1989–90 season with the Rangers' IHL affiliate, the Flint Spirits, before leaving to join the Canadian National Hockey Team for two seasons. This included representing Canada at the 1992 Winter Olympics, where Archibald won a silver medal.

Archibald returned to the NHL in the 1992–93 season with the Ottawa Senators. After four seasons with the Senators, Archibald played in seven games with the New York Islanders in the 1996–97 season. He also played in Germany's Deutsche Eishockey Liga that season with the Frankfurt Lions. He then spent three seasons in the IHL before finishing up his career in Sweden's Elitserien with Linköpings HC in the 1999–2000 season.

In his NHL career, Archibald appeared in 323 games. He scored 57 goals and added 67 assists. He also played in five games for Minnesota during the 1989 Stanley Cup Playoffs, recording one assist.

== Coaching career ==
Archibald joined the Chilliwack Bruins as an assistant coach prior to the 2008-09 season and added the duties of Hockey Operations Advisor and Community Liaison in February 2009.

== Career statistics ==
=== Regular season and playoffs ===
			Regular season					Playoffs
Season	Team	League	GP	G	A	Pts	PIM	GP	G	A	Pts	PIM
1983–84	Portland Winter Hawks	WHL	7	0	1	1	2	—	—	—	—	—
1984–85	Portland Winter Hawks	WHL	47	7	11	18	10	3	0	2	2	0
1985–86	Portland Winter Hawks	WHL	70	29	35	64	56	15	6	7	13	11
1986–87	Portland Winter Hawks	WHL	65	50	57	107	40	20	10	18	28	11
1987–88	Minnesota North Stars	NHL	78	13	20	33	26	—	—	—	—	—
1988–89	Minnesota North Stars	NHL	72	14	19	33	14	5	0	1	1	0
1989–90	Minnesota North Stars	NHL	12	1	5	6	6	—	—	—	—	—
1989–90	New York Rangers	NHL	19	2	3	5	6	—	—	—	—	—
1989–90	Flint Spirits	IHL	41	14	38	52	16	4	3	2	5	0
1990–91	Canada	Intl	29	19	12	31	20	—	—	—	—	—
1991–92	Canada	Intl	58	20	43	63	64	—	—	—	—	—
1991–92	HC Bolzano	ITA	5	4	3	7	16	7	8	5	13	7
1992–93	Binghamton Rangers	AHL	8	6	3	9	10	—	—	—	—	—
1992–93	Ottawa Senators	NHL	44	9	6	15	32	—	—	—	—	—
1993–94	Ottawa Senators	NHL	33	10	8	18	14	—	—	—	—	—
1994–95	Ottawa Senators	NHL	14	2	2	4	19	—	—	—	—	—
1995–96	Ottawa Senators	NHL	44	6	4	10	18	—	—	—	—	—
1995–96	Utah Grizzlies	IHL	19	1	4	5	10	—	—	—	—	—
1996–97	Frankfurt Lions	DEL	34	10	19	29	48	9	4	3	7	16
1996–97	New York Islanders	NHL	7	0	0	0	4	—	—	—	—	—
1997–98	San Antonio Dragons	IHL	55	11	21	32	10	—	—	—	—	—
1998–99	Utah Grizzlies	IHL	76	23	25	48	32	—	—	—	—	—
1999–00	Utah Grizzlies	IHL	27	7	4	11	10	5	0	0	0	0
1999–00	Linköpings HC	SEL	21	5	4	9	18	—	—	—	—	—
NHL totals			323	57	67	124	139	5	0	1	1	0
IHL totals			218	56	92	148	78	9	3	2	5	0

Medal record

Representing Canada

Ice hockey

Olympic Games
Silver medal – second place	1992 Albertville	Men's Ice hockey

World Championships
Silver medal – second place	1991 Turkuhalli	Men's Ice hockey

=== International ===
Year	Team	Event	GP	G	A	Pts	PIM
1991	Canada	WC	10	0	1	1	8
1992	Canada	OG	8	7	1	8	18
Senior totals			18	7	2	9	26

Preceded by Warren Babe	Minnesota North Stars first-round draft pick 1987	Succeeded by Mike Modano
