= Jamie Huscroft =

Canadian retired ice hockey defenceman (born 1967)

- Born: January 9, 1967 (age 59) Creston, British Columbia, Canada
- Height: 6 ft 2 in (188 cm)
- Weight: 200 lb (91 kg; 14 st 4 lb)
- Position: Defence
- Shot: Right
- Played for: New Jersey Devils; Boston Bruins; Calgary Flames; Tampa Bay Lightning; Vancouver Canucks; Phoenix Coyotes; Washington Capitals
- NHL draft: 171st overall, 1985; New Jersey Devils
- Playing career: 1987–2001

James W. Huscroft (born January 9, 1967) is a Canadian former professional ice hockey defenceman who spent parts of ten seasons in the National Hockey League.

== Playing career ==
Huscroft was born in Creston, British Columbia. A tough defensive defenceman, Huscroft accumulated almost 3,000 penalty minutes in his professional hockey career, including over 1,000 in the National Hockey League (NHL). While a slow skater and not possessing tremendous natural abilities, Huscroft succeeded in pro hockey due to his tremendous grit, work ethic, and perseverance. Though he was never more than a sixth or seventh defender on any team in the NHL, he was a consummate warrior and leader, and well respected by teammates and rivals alike.

Huscroft was originally drafted by the New Jersey Devils in the 1985 NHL Draft, and turned professional in 1987. He spent five years with New Jersey's top AHL affiliate in Utica, and also managed to appear in 65 NHL games for the Devils before moving to the Boston Bruins organization in 1992. He managed to crack Boston's NHL roster for good midway through the 1993–94 season, and stuck in the NHL for the next six seasons, also suiting up for the Calgary Flames, Tampa Bay Lightning, Vancouver Canucks, Phoenix Coyotes, and Washington Capitals. He finished his career in 2001 with 5 goals and 37 points in 352 career NHL games, along with 1,065 penalty minutes.

Huscroft was an assistant coach with the Spokane Chiefs in the Western Hockey League, and currently works with HES, Hockey Educational Systems in Renton, Washington, instructing amateur ice hockey players of all levels and is the director of facilities for Sno-King Ice Arenas (Renton, Kirkland, and Snoqualmie, Washington).

== Career statistics ==
=== Regular season and playoffs ===
			Regular season					Playoffs
Season	Team	League	GP	G	A	Pts	PIM	GP	G	A	Pts	PIM
1983–84	Portland Winter Hawks	WHL	18	0	5	5	15	—	—	—	—	—
1983–84	Seattle Breakers	WHL	45	0	7	7	62	5	0	0	0	15
1984–85	Seattle Breakers	WHL	69	3	13	16	273	—	—	—	—	—
1985–86	Seattle Thunderbirds	WHL	66	6	20	26	394	5	0	1	1	18
1986–87	Seattle Thunderbirds	WHL	21	1	18	19	99	—	—	—	—	—
1986–87	Medicine Hat Tigers	WHL	14	3	3	6	71	20	0	3	3	125
1987–88	Utica Devils	AHL	71	5	7	12	316	—	—	—	—	—
1987–88	Flint Spirits	IHL	3	1	0	1	2	16	0	1	1	110
1988–89	Utica Devils	AHL	41	2	10	12	215	5	0	0	0	40
1988–89	New Jersey Devils	NHL	15	0	2	2	51	—	—	—	—	—
1989–90	Utica Devils	AHL	22	3	6	9	122	—	—	—	—	—
1989–90	New Jersey Devils	NHL	42	2	3	5	149	5	0	0	0	16
1990–91	Utica Devils	AHL	59	3	15	18	339	—	—	—	—	—
1990–91	New Jersey Devils	NHL	8	0	1	1	27	3	0	0	0	6
1991–92	Utica Devils	AHL	50	4	7	11	224	—	—	—	—	—
1992–93	Providence Bruins	AHL	69	2	15	17	257	2	0	1	1	6
1993–94	Providence Bruins	AHL	32	1	10	11	157	—	—	—	—	—
1993–94	Boston Bruins	NHL	36	0	1	1	144	4	0	0	0	9
1994–95	Fresno Falcons	SuHL	3	1	1	2	24	—	—	—	—	—
1994–95	Boston Bruins	NHL	34	0	6	6	103	5	0	0	0	11
1995–96	Calgary Flames	NHL	70	3	9	12	162	4	0	1	1	4
1996–97	Calgary Flames	NHL	39	0	4	4	117	—	—	—	—	—
1996–97	Tampa Bay Lightning	NHL	13	0	1	1	34	—	—	—	—	—
1997–98	Tampa Bay Lightning	NHL	44	0	3	3	122	—	—	—	—	—
1997–98	Vancouver Canucks	NHL	7	0	1	1	55	—	—	—	—	—
1998–99	Vancouver Canucks	NHL	26	0	1	1	63	—	—	—	—	—
1998–99	Phoenix Coyotes	NHL	11	0	1	1	27	—	—	—	—	—
1999–00	Portland Pirates	AHL	56	0	12	12	154	4	0	0	0	14
1999–00	Washington Capitals	NHL	7	0	0	0	11	—	—	—	—	—
2000–01	Portland Pirates	AHL	6	0	1	1	12	—	—	—	—	—
AHL totals			406	19	33	52	1796	11	0	1	1	60
NHL totals			352	5	33	38	1065	21	0	1	1	46
