= Grant Tkachuk =

Canadian ice hockey player

- Born: September 24, 1968 (age 57) Lac La Biche, Alberta, Canada
- Height: 5 ft 9 in (175 cm)
- Weight: 174 lb (79 kg; 12 st 6 lb)
- Position: Left wing
- Played for: Rochester Americans (AHL); Phoenix Roadrunners (IHL)
- NHL draft: 169th overall, 1987; Buffalo Sabres
- Playing career: 1988–1990

Grant Tkachuk (born September 24, 1968) is a Canadian former professional ice hockey player. He was selected by the Buffalo Sabres in the ninth round (169th overall) of the 1987 NHL entry draft.

Tkachuk played major junior hockey with the Saskatoon Blades of the Western Hockey League (WHL) Eastern Conference. On February 9, 1988, Tkachuk christened Saskatchewan Place when during a WHL contest between the Blades and the visiting Brandon Wheat Kings (the arena's first ever event), Tkachuk scored the first ever goal on Saskatchewan Place ice, beating Brandon goalie George Maneluk at 12:35 of the first period. Following the conclusion of the season, Tkachuk was honoured for his outstanding play when he was named to the 1987–88 First All-Star Team.

Tkachuk began his professional career in 1988 with the Rochester Americans of the American Hockey League, registering 25 points and 26 penalty minutes in 64 games during his rookie season. He played the 1989–90 season in the International Hockey League (IHL) with the Phoenix Roadrunners, where he scored 40 points and earned 66 penalty minutes in 72 games played.

== Awards and honours ==
Award	Year
WHL East First Team All-Star	1987–88
