= Craig Endean =

Canadian ice hockey player

- Born: April 13, 1968 (age 58) Kamloops, British Columbia, Canada
- Height: 5 ft 11 in (180 cm)
- Weight: 172 lb (78 kg; 12 st 4 lb)
- Position: Left wing
- Shot: Left
- Played for: Winnipeg Jets
- NHL draft: 92nd overall, 1986; Winnipeg Jets
- Playing career: 1983–1993

Craig Thomas Endean (born April 13, 1968) is a Canadian former professional National Hockey League left winger. In the 1986–87 NHL season, he played two games for the Winnipeg Jets, and registered one assist.

== Career statistics ==
			Regular season					Playoffs
Season	Team	League	GP	G	A	Pts	PIM	GP	G	A	Pts	PIM
1983–84	Seattle Breakers	WHL	67	16	6	22	14	5	2	2	4	2
1984–85	Seattle Breakers	WHL	69	37	60	97	28	—	—	—	—	—
1985–86	Seattle Thunderbirds	WHL	70	58	70	128	34	5	5	1	6	0
1986–87	Seattle Thunderbirds	WHL	17	20	20	40	18	—	—	—	—	—
1986–87	Regina Pats	WHL	59	49	57	106	16	3	5	0	5	4
1986–87	Winnipeg Jets	NHL	2	0	1	1	0	—	—	—	—	—
1987–88	Regina Pats	WHL	69	50	86	136	50	4	4	9	13	8
1988–89	Moncton Hawks	AHL	18	3	9	12	16	—	—	—	—	—
1988–89	Fort Wayne Komets	IHL	34	10	18	28	0	10	4	7	11	6
1989–90	Adirondack Red Wings	AHL	7	3	3	6	4	—	—	—	—	—
1989–90	Fort Wayne Komets	IHL	20	2	11	13	8	—	—	—	—	—
1990–91	Canada	Intl	3	2	0	2	2	—	—	—	—	—
1991–92	Winston-Salem Thunderbirds	ECHL	54	25	46	71	27	4	1	6	7	2
1992–93	Roanoke Valley Rampage	ECHL	37	15	36	51	51	—	—	—	—	—
NHL totals			2	0	1	1	0	—	—	—	—	—
IHL totals			54	12	29	41	8	10	4	7	11	6
ECHL totals			91	40	82	122	78	4	1	6	7	2

== Awards ==
- WHL East First All-Star Team – 1988
