= Dennis Vaske =

American ice hockey player (born 1967)

- Born: October 11, 1967 (age 58) Rockford, Illinois, U.S.
- Height: 6 ft 2 in (188 cm)
- Weight: 209 lb (95 kg; 14 st 13 lb)
- Position: Defense
- Shot: Left
- Played for: Boston Bruins; New York Islanders; Providence Bruins; Capital District Islanders
- National team: United States
- NHL draft: 38th overall, 1986; New York Islanders
- Playing career: 1990–1999

Dennis James Vaske (born October 11, 1967) is an American former professional ice hockey defenseman. Vaske started his National Hockey League career with the New York Islanders in 1991. He also played for the Boston Bruins. He retired after the 1998–99 season. Internationally, he played for the United States at the 1992 World Championships.

== Career statistics ==
=== Regular season and playoffs ===
			Regular season					Playoffs
Season	Team	League	GP	G	A	Pts	PIM	GP	G	A	Pts	PIM
1984–85	Robbinsdale Armstrong High School	HS-MN	22	5	18	23	—	—	—	—	—	—
1985–86	Robbinsdale Armstrong High School	HS-MN	20	9	13	22	—	—	—	—	—	—
1986–87	University of Minnesota-Duluth	WCHA	33	0	2	2	40	—	—	—	—	—
1987–88	University of Minnesota-Duluth	WCHA	39	1	6	7	90	—	—	—	—	—
1988–89	University of Minnesota-Duluth	WCHA	37	9	19	28	86	—	—	—	—	—
1989–90	University of Minnesota-Duluth	WCHA	37	5	24	29	72	—	—	—	—	—
1990–91	New York Islanders	NHL	5	0	0	0	2	—	—	—	—	—
1990–91	Capital District Islanders	AHL	67	10	10	20	65	—	—	—	—	—
1991–92	New York Islanders	NHL	39	0	1	1	39	—	—	—	—	—
1991–92	Capital District Islanders	AHL	31	1	11	12	59	—	—	—	—	—
1992–93	New York Islanders	NHL	27	1	5	6	32	18	0	6	6	14
1992–93	Capital District Islanders	AHL	42	4	15	19	70	—	—	—	—	—
1993–94	New York Islanders	NHL	65	2	11	13	76	4	0	1	1	2
1994–95	New York Islanders	NHL	41	1	11	12	53	—	—	—	—	—
1995–96	New York Islanders	NHL	19	1	6	7	21	—	—	—	—	—
1996–97	New York Islanders	NHL	17	0	4	4	12	—	—	—	—	—
1997–98	New York Islanders	NHL	19	0	3	3	12	—	—	—	—	—
1998–99	Boston Bruins	NHL	3	0	0	0	6	—	—	—	—	—
1998–99	Providence Bruins	AHL	43	2	13	15	56	19	1	5	6	26
NHL totals			235	5	41	46	253	22	0	7	7	16

=== International ===
Year	Team	Event	GP	G	A	Pts	PIM
1992	United States	WC	6	0	0	0	6
Senior totals			6	0	0	0	6
