= Mark Pederson =

Canadian ice hockey player (born 1968)

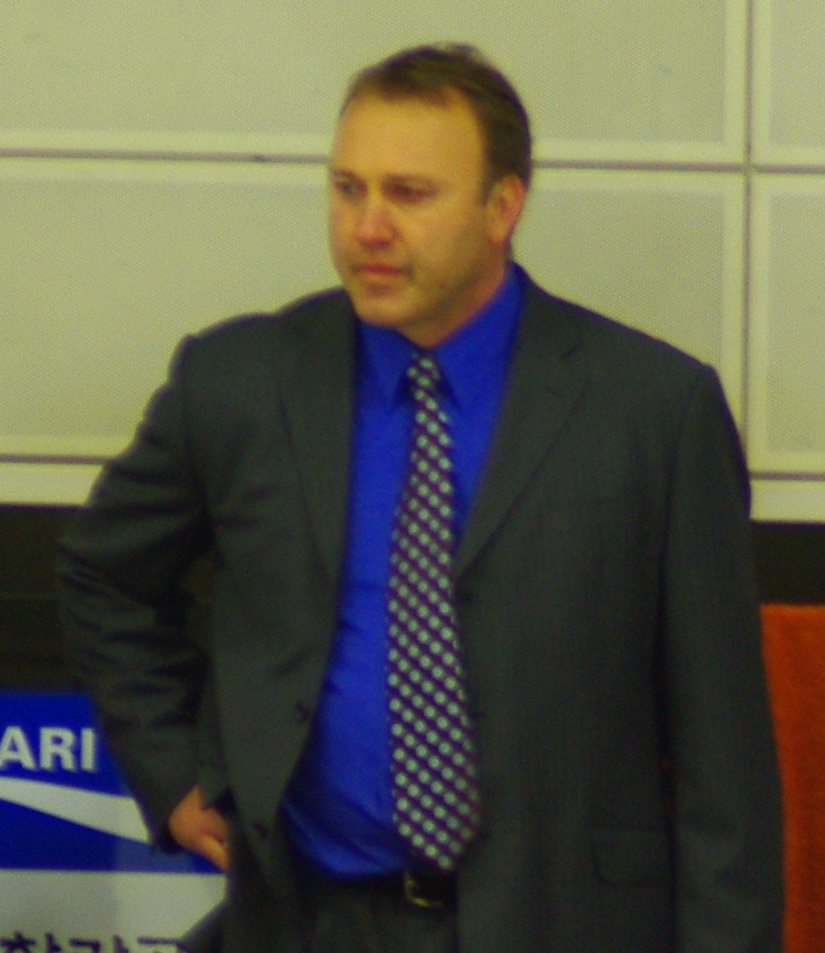
- Born: January 14, 1968 (age 58) Prelate, Saskatchewan, Canada
- Height: 6 ft 2 in (188 cm)
- Weight: 196 lb (89 kg; 14 st 0 lb)
- Position: Left wing
- Shot: Left
- Played for: Montreal Canadiens; Philadelphia Flyers; San Jose Sharks; Detroit Red Wings
- NHL draft: 15th overall, 1986; Montreal Canadiens
- Playing career: 1988–2005

Mark Patrick Pederson (born January 14, 1968) is a Canadian ice hockey coach and former professional ice hockey left winger who played 169 games in the National Hockey League (NHL). He is currently serving as head coach of German side Augsburger Panther since 2021.

Pederson was born in Prelate, Saskatchewan, but grew up in Medicine Hat, Alberta.

== Playing career ==
Pederson was drafted 15th overall by the Canadiens in the 1986 NHL entry draft. He spent played five seasons in the National Hockey League (NHL) for the Montreal Canadiens, Philadelphia Flyers, San Jose Sharks and Detroit Red Wings from 1989–90 until 1993–94. He saw action in a total of 169 NHL games, scoring 35 goals and 50 assists for 85 points.

In 1995, he took his game overseas and signed with Austrian side Villacher SV. In the following season (1996–97), he played for Färjestad BK in Sweden, before transferring to Zürcher SC of Switzerland. From 1997 to 2002, Pederson spent time in Germany, representing DEL teams Hannover Scorpions, Krefeld Pinguine and Adler Mannheim and won the German championship with the Adler squad in 2001. Pederson joined the San Diego Gulls in 2002 and had a three-year stint with the team. In the 2002-03 season, he led the Gulls to winning the Taylor Cup, while being named Playoff MVP and WCHL Forward of the Year. He retired following the 2004-05 season.

== Coaching career ==
Pederson served a four-year stint as assistant coach of ECHL's Bakersfield Condors from 2005 to 2009 and was the head coach of the Tilburg Trappers of the Dutch Eredivisie in 2009-10, while also coaching the Serbian national team. After one season he left Tilburg and went to Japan where he acted as head coach of the Nikkō Ice Bucks between 2010 and 2013.

Pederson took over the head coaching job at Esbjerg Energy prior to the 2013–14 season. After a runner-up finish in 2015, he guided the Energy to the Danish championship in 2016 and 2017.

== Legal troubles ==
Pederson was suspended for two weeks in 2009 for an "internal matter" while working as an assistant coach with the Bakersfield Condors, which was revealed later to be due to antisemitic comments toward then-Condor Jason Bailey. In January 2011, Pederson was named in a lawsuit filed by Bailey's lawyer, Keith Fink, alleging that his client faced "a barrage of anti-Semitic, offensive and degrading verbal attacks regarding his Jewish faith" from Pederson and head coach Marty Raymond. Pederson, in particular, was named in the suit as having approached Bailey on one occasion to state: "oh, I got a (Facebook) friend request from a dirty Jew." On January 27, ESPN.com released details of court documents filed by Fink and reported that the NHL is also now investigating. According to a report dated November 8, 2011, Bailey voluntarily filed a request to dismiss all claims of discrimination.

== Career statistics ==
=== Regular season and playoffs ===
			Regular season					Playoffs
Season	Team	League	GP	G	A	Pts	PIM	GP	G	A	Pts	PIM
1983–84	Medicine Hat Tigers AAA	AMHL	42	43	47	90	64	—	—	—	—	—
1983–84	Medicine Hat Tigers	WHL	3	0	0	0	0	—	—	—	—	—
1984–85	Medicine Hat Tigers	WHL	71	42	40	82	63	10	3	2	5	0
1985–86	Medicine Hat Tigers	WHL	72	46	60	106	46	25	12	6	18	25
1986–87	Medicine Hat Tigers	WHL	69	56	46	102	58	20	19	7	26	14
1987–88	Medicine Hat Tigers	WHL	62	53	58	111	55	16	13	6	19	16
1988–89	Sherbrooke Canadiens	AHL	75	43	38	81	53	6	7	5	12	4
1989–90	Montreal Canadiens	NHL	9	0	2	2	2	2	0	0	0	0
1989–90	Sherbrooke Canadiens	AHL	72	53	42	95	60	11	10	8	18	19
1990–91	Montreal Canadiens	NHL	47	8	15	23	18	—	—	—	—	—
1990–91	Philadelphia Flyers	NHL	12	2	1	3	5	—	—	—	—	—
1991–92	Philadelphia Flyers	NHL	58	15	25	40	22	—	—	—	—	—
1992–93	Philadelphia Flyers	NHL	14	3	4	7	6	—	—	—	—	—
1992–93	San Jose Sharks	NHL	27	7	3	10	22	—	—	—	—	—
1993–94	Detroit Red Wings	NHL	2	0	0	0	2	—	—	—	—	—
1993–94	Adirondack Red Wings	AHL	62	52	45	97	37	12	4	7	11	10
1994–95	Kalamazoo Wings	IHL	75	31	32	63	47	16	8	4	12	2
1995–96	EC VSV	AUT	34	28	32	60	52	—	—	—	—	—
1996–97	Färjestad BK	SEL	30	7	4	11	26	—	—	—	—	—
1996–97	Zürcher SC	NLA	9	7	3	10	4	5	1	3	4	30
1997–98	Hannover Scorpions	DEL	39	19	32	51	55	9	1	6	7	6
1998–99	Krefeld Pinguine	DEL	50	21	27	48	40	4	3	1	4	4
1999–00	Krefeld Pinguine	DEL	44	20	17	37	80	3	2	0	2	4
2000–01	Adler Mannheim	DEL	42	7	7	14	16	11	3	5	8	4
2001–02	Hannover Scorpions	DEL	54	18	10	28	32	—	—	—	—	—
2002–03	San Diego Gulls	WCHL	60	39	33	72	34	12	6	10	16	2
2003–04	San Diego Gulls	ECHL	70	44	37	81	38	3	2	0	2	0
2004–05	San Diego Gulls	ECHL	48	13	21	34	34	—	—	—	—	—
DEL totals			229	85	93	178	223	27	9	12	21	18
NHL totals			169	35	50	85	77	2	0	0	0	0

=== International ===
Year	Team	Event	GP	G	A	Pts	PIM
1988	Canada	WJC	7	1	2	3	4

== Awards ==
- WHL East First All-Star Team – 1987
- WHL East Second All-Star Team – 1988

Preceded by Tom Chorske	Montreal Canadiens first-round draft pick 1986	Succeeded by Andrew Cassels
