= Medicine Hat Tigers =

Western Hockey League team in Medicine Hat, Alberta

- City: Medicine Hat, Alberta
- League: Western Hockey League
- Conference: Eastern
- Division: Central
- Founded: 1970
- Home arena: Co-op Place
- Colours: Orange and Black
- General manager: Willie Desjardins
- Head coach: Willie Desjardins
- Website: chl.ca/whl-tigers

Championships
- Regular season titles: 2 (1985–86, 2005–06)
- Playoff championships: Ed Chynoweth Cup; 6 (1973, 1987, 1988, 2004, 2007, 2025); Memorial Cup; 2 (1987, 1988); Conference Championships; 3 (2003–04, 2006–07, 2024–25)

Current uniform

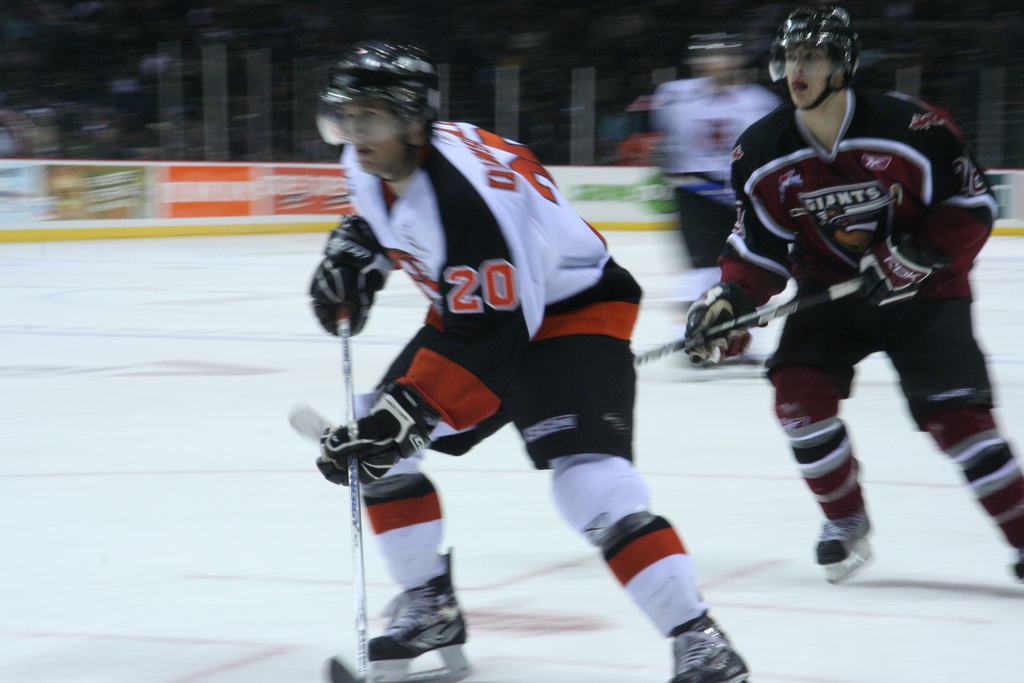
Travis Dunstall playing for the Tigers in 2007.

The Medicine Hat Tigers are a Canadian major junior ice hockey team in the Western Hockey League (WHL) based in Medicine Hat, Alberta. Established in 1970, the team is tied with the Kamloops Blazers for the most Ed Chynoweth Cups as league champion with six, and have gone on to win two Memorial Cup titles. The Tigers also have seven Division titles. Since 2015, the Tigers play at Co-op Place after forty-five seasons at the Medicine Hat Arena.

== History ==
Medicine Hat was granted a team in the Western Canada Hockey League ahead of its fifth season, and the Tigers began play in 1970–71. Although the team struggled in its inaugural season, the Tigers rapidly improved, led by the scoring exploits of Tom Lysiak—who won league scoring titles in 1972 and 1973—Lanny McDonald. The team made the playoffs in its second season, and in its third made it to the championship final. In the final, they defeated the Saskatoon Blades to win their first title.

The Tigers' next significant run of success came in the latter half of the 1980s. In 1986, the team secured its first regular season title and advanced to its first of three consecutive league finals. Led by the likes of Trevor Linden, Wayne McBean, and Mark Pederson, the Tigers would capture back-to-back championships and Memorial Cup titles in 1987 and 1988. Because of their success, the championship Tigers' teams were inducted into the Alberta Sports Hall of Fame.

The Tigers won two more league titles in a four-year span between 2004 and 2007. In 2004, Medicine Hat put together the best record in the Eastern Conference and advanced to the final, where they swept the expansion Everett Silvertips. In 2005–06, the Tigers secured their second regular season title, before losing the Conference Final against the Moose Jaw Warriors. The following season, they would return to the championship series, where they faced the Vancouver Giants. Backstopped by goaltender Matt Keetley, the Tigers defeated the Giants in double-overtime of game seven to win the title. Because Vancouver was hosting the 2007 Memorial Cup, both teams advanced to the tournament. The Tigers again defeated the Giants in overtime during the preliminary round in order to advance directly to the final, which wound up being a re-match between the two rivals. In the final, the host Giants avenged their earlier losses, defeating the Tigers 3–1 at Pacific Coliseum.

Since their last title run in 2007, the Tigers have missed the playoffs only twice, but have failed to advance past the second round of the playoffs, even despite securing division titles in 2016–17 and 2017–18. In 2015, the team moved from the old Arena to the new Co-op Place. In 2024, Gavin McKenna became the fourth Tiger and the first since Neil Brady in 1986 to be named the winner of the Jim Piggott Memorial Trophy as WHL rookie of the year.

== Season-by-season record ==
Note: GP = Games played, W = Wins, L = Losses, T = Ties, OTL = Overtime losses, Pts = Points, GF = Goals for, GA = Goals against

Season	GP	W	L	T	OTL	GF	GA	Points	Finish	Playoffs
1970–71	66	22	43	1	-	271	351	45	5th West	Did not qualify
1971–72	68	35	30	3	-	351	312	73	4th West	Lost in quarterfinal
1972–73	68	39	20	9	-	348	254	87	2nd West	Won Championship
1973–74	68	29	31	8	-	305	314	66	3rd West	Lost in quarterfinal
1974–75	70	40	22	8	-	380	291	88	2nd West	Lost in quarterfinal
1975–76	72	38	24	10	-	379	306	86	3rd West	Lost in quarterfinal
1976–77	72	32	28	12	-	330	304	76	1st Central	Lost in preliminary round
1977–78	72	22	41	9	-	293	365	53	3rd Central	Lost in Central Division final
1978–79	72	15	50	7	-	270	479	37	4th Central	Did not qualify
1979–80	72	37	30	5	-	344	315	79	3rd East	Lost in East Division final
1980–81	72	40	29	3	-	358	302	83	3rd East	Lost in East Division quarterfinal
1981–82	72	25	46	1	-	308	446	51	7th East	Did not qualify
1982–83	72	37	34	1	-	345	338	75	6th East	Lost in East Division quarterfinal
1983–84	72	45	26	1	-	404	288	91	2nd East	Lost in East Division final
1984–85	72	53	17	2	-	355	224	108	2nd East	Lost in East Division final
1985–86	72	54	17	1	-	384	245	109	1st East	Lost in final
1986–87	72	48	19	5	-	383	264	101	1st East	Won Championship and Memorial Cup
1987–88	72	44	22	6	-	353	261	94	2nd East	Won Championship and Memorial Cup
1988–89	72	41	27	4	-	359	326	86	3rd East	Lost in East Division quarterfinal
1989–90	72	32	38	2	-	298	331	66	5th East	Lost in East Division quarterfinal
1990–91	72	40	27	5	-	366	296	85	2nd East	Lost in East Division final
1991–92	72	48	24	0	-	336	264	96	2nd East	Lost in East Division quarterfinal
1992–93	72	29	38	5	-	285	343	63	7th East	Lost in East Division semifinal
1993–94	72	33	33	6	-	263	264	72	5th East	Lost in East Division quarterfinal
1994–95	72	38	32	2	-	244	229	78	5th East	Lost in East Division quarterfinal
1995–96	72	30	37	5	-	243	288	65	3rd Central	Lost Eastern Conference quarterfinal
1996–97	72	39	32	1	-	270	278	79	3rd Central	Lost Eastern Conference quarterfinal
1997–98	72	16	50	6	-	188	340	38	5th Central	Did not qualify
1998–99	72	15	56	1	-	185	323	31	5th Central	Did not qualify
1999–00	72	21	39	6	6	222	295	54	5th Central	Did not qualify
2000–01	72	24	40	5	3	271	316	56	5th Central	Did not qualify
2001–02	72	30	36	4	2	277	316	66	5th Central	Did not qualify
2002–03	72	29	34	2	7	278	314	67	3rd Central	Lost in Eastern Conference semifinal
2003–04	72	40	20	9	3	277	216	92	1st Central	Won Championship
2004–05	72	45	21	4	2	234	143	96	1st Central	Lost in Eastern Conference semifinal
Season	GP	W	L	OTL	SOL	GF	GA	Points	Finish	Playoffs
2005–06	72	47	16	1	8	257	171	103	1st Central	Lost in Eastern Conference final
2006–07	72	52	17	3	0	264	175	107	1st Central	Won Championship; Lost Memorial Cup final
2007–08	72	43	22	5	2	234	191	93	3rd Central	Lost Eastern Conference quarterfinal
2008–09	72	36	29	4	3	249	242	79	2nd Central	Lost in Eastern Conference semifinal
2009–10	72	41	23	3	5	276	232	90	3rd Central	Lost in Eastern Conference semifinal
2010–11	72	46	18	4	4	265	196	100	2nd Central	Lost in Eastern Conference final
2011–12	72	42	24	2	4	255	209	90	3rd Central	Lost in Eastern Conference semifinal
2012–13	72	36	33	2	1	243	244	75	4th Central	Lost in Eastern Conference semifinal
2013–14	72	44	24	3	1	260	196	92	3rd Central	Lost in Eastern Conference final
2014–15	72	45	23	2	2	268	213	94	2nd Central	Lost in Eastern Conference semifinal
2015–16	72	30	37	3	2	223	287	65	5th Central	Lost tiebreaker game vs Edmonton
2016–17	72	51	20	1	0	350	248	103	1st Central	Lost in Eastern Conference semifinal
2017–18	72	36	28	8	0	260	252	80	1st Central	Lost Eastern Conference quarterfinal
2018–19	68	35	27	4	2	217	222	76	4th Central	Lost Eastern Conference quarterfinal
2019–20	63	41	19	2	1	265	182	85	2nd Central	Cancelled due to the COVID-19 pandemic
2020–21	23	14	8	0	1	87	69	29	2nd Central	No playoffs due to the COVID-19 pandemic
2021-22	68	11	53	3	1	154	315	26	6th Central	Did not qualify
2022–23	68	30	29	8	1	248	224	69	4th Central	Lost Eastern Conference quarterfinal
2023–24	68	37	23	6	2	280	231	82	2nd Central	Lost Eastern Conference quarterfinal
2024–25	68	47	17	3	1	300	193	98	1st Central	Won Championship; Lost Memorial Cup final
2025–26	68	50	10	5	3	348	208	108	1st Central	Lost in Eastern Conference final

== WHL Championship history ==
- Memorial Cups: 1987, 1988
- President's Cups/Ed Chynoweth Cups: 1972–73, 1986–87, 1987–88, 2003–04, 2006–07, 2024–25
- Scotty Munro Memorial Trophies: 1985–86, 2005–06
- Conference Championships: 2003–04, 2006–07, 2024–25
- Regular Season division titles:

Central (9): 1976-77, 2003-04, 2004-05, 2005-06, 2006-07, 2016-17, 2017-18, 2024-25, 2025-26
East (2): 1985-86, 1986-87

=== WHL Championships ===
- 1972–73: Win, 3–0–2, vs. Saskatoon Blades
- 1985–86: Loss, 1–4, vs. Kamloops Blazers
- 1986–87: Win, 4–3, vs. Portland Winter Hawks
- 1987–88: Win, 4–2, vs. Kamloops Blazers
- 2003–04: Win, 4–0, vs. Everett Silvertips
- 2006–07: Win, 4–3, vs. Vancouver Giants
- 2024–25: Win, 4–1, vs. Spokane Chiefs

=== Memorial Cup finals ===
- 1987: Win, 6–2 vs Oshawa Generals
- 1988: Win, 7–6 vs Windsor Spitfires
- 2007: Loss, 1–3 vs Vancouver Giants
- 2025: Loss, 1–4 vs London Knights

== NHL alumni ==
- Johnathan Aitken
- Ron Areshenkoff
- Cam Barker
- Doug Barkley
- Bob Bassen
- Hank Bassen
- Craig Berube
- Tim Bothwell
- Derek Boogaard
- Jay Bouwmeester
- Neil Brady
- Rod Buskas
- Brian Carlin
- Greg Carroll
- Jason Chimera
- Shane Churla
- Dean Chynoweth
- Martin Cibak
- Al Conroy
- David Cooper
- Murray Craven
- Barry Dean
- Rob DiMaio
- Derek Dorsett
- Rocky Dundas
- Tyler Ennis
- Emerson Etem
- Vernon Fiddler
- Mark Fitzpatrick
- Ron Flockhart
- Val Fonteyne
- Troy Gamble
- Bob Gassoff
- Brad Gassoff
- Josh Green
- Travis Green
- Bruce Greig
- Kevan Guy
- Len Haley
- James Hamblin
- Darren Helm
- Brian Hill
- John Hilworth
- Justin Hocking
- Ken Holland
- Ryan Hollweg
- Doug Houda
- Kelly Hrudey
- Jamie Huscroft
- Gord Hynes
- Eddie Johnstone
- Matt Keetley
- Dan Kordic
- Dale Kushner
- Mark Lamb
- Jamie Linden
- Trevor Linden
- Morris Lukowich
- Joffrey Lupul
- Ron Lyons
- Tom Lysiak
- Clarke MacArthur
- David Mackey
- Mike MacWilliam
- Merlin Malinowski
- Milan Marcetta
- Bryan Maxwell
- Alan May
- Wayne McBean
- Bryan McCabe
- Jim McCrimmon
- Lanny McDonald
- Ryan McGill
- John McKenzie
- Tom McMurchy
- Barry Melrose
- Stefan Meyer
- Jason Miller
- Don Murdoch
- Rob Niedermayer
- Jim Nill
- Jaroslav Obsut
- Chris Osgood
- Allen Pedersen
- Mark Pederson
- Pete Peeters
- Mike Rathje
- Darren Reid
- Stacy Roest
- Kris Russell
- Paxton Schafer
- David Schlemko
- Cole Sillinger
- Don Smith
- Mads Sogaard
- Ken Solheim
- Brent Thompson
- Rocky Thompson
- Rocky Trottier
- Greg Vaydik
- Stan Weir
- Neil Wilkinson
- Mike Zanier
- Richard Zemlak

== Team records ==
Team records for a single season
Statistic	Total	Season
Most points	109	1985–86
Most wins	54	1985–86
Most goals for	404	1983–84
Fewest goals for	185	1998–99
Fewest goals against	143	2004–05
Most goals against	479	1978–79

Individual player records for a single season
Statistic	Player	Total	Season
Most goals	Don Murdoch	88	1975–76
Most assists	Greg Carroll	111	1975–76
Most points	Greg Carroll	171	1975–76
Most points, rookie	Don Murdoch	141	1974–75
Most points, defenceman	Cliff Lane	82	1975–76
Best GAA (goalie)	Matt Keetley	1.66	2004–05
Goalies = minimum 1500 minutes played

== See also ==
- List of ice hockey teams in Alberta
