= Daniel Lacroix =

Canadian ice hockey player

- Lacroix in 2026
- Born: March 11, 1969 (age 57) Montreal, Quebec, Canada
- Height: 6 ft 2 in (188 cm)
- Weight: 205 lb (93 kg; 14 st 9 lb)
- Position: Left wing
- Shot: Left
- Played for: New York Rangers; Boston Bruins; Philadelphia Flyers; Edmonton Oilers; New York Islanders
- NHL draft: 31st overall, 1987; New York Rangers
- Playing career: 1989–2002

Daniel Lacroix (born March 11, 1969) is a Canadian former professional ice hockey player and coach. He played in the National Hockey League with five teams between 1993 and 2000. The rest of his career, which lasted from 1989 to 2002, was spent in various minor leagues. After retiring as a player, he became a coach, working for many teams.

In December 2019, he was named the head coach of the Moncton Wildcats in the Quebec Major Junior Hockey League. He was an assistant coach for the Montreal Canadiens until April 27, 2018, to become head coach of the Lithuanian national team. Lacroix was drafted by the New York Rangers in the second round, 33rd overall, of the 1989 NHL entry draft. A seven-year NHL veteran left wing, Lacroix played for the New York Rangers, Boston Bruins, Philadelphia Flyers, Edmonton Oilers, and the New York Islanders.

== Career ==
Born in Montreal, Quebec, Lacroix appeared in a total of 188 NHL games for the New York Rangers, Boston Bruins, Philadelphia Flyers, Edmonton Oilers and the New York Islanders recording 11 goals and seven assists for 18 points and 379 penalty minutes. Aside from the playing in the NHL, Lacroix also spent eight seasons in the American Hockey League (AHL), three seasons in the International Hockey League (IHL) and four seasons in the Quebec Major Junior Hockey League (QMJHL). In 2000, he won the Turner Cup championship with the Chicago Wolves.

== Coaching career ==
From 2002 to 2006, Lacroix was an assistant coach of the Moncton Wildcats. During his stint with the team, the Wildcats reached the QMJHL finals twice, including a Memorial Cup appearance in 2006. Halfway through the 2004–05 season, Lacroix took over as Moncton's interim head coach for the second half of the season. From 2006 to 2009, he served as assistant coach for the New York Islanders. On August 5, 2009, Lacroix was named an assistant coach for the Hamilton Bulldogs for the 2009–10 AHL season. When Guy Boucher was hired as coach of the Tampa Bay Lightning, Lacroix followed Boucher to Tampa Bay. From the 2013–14 season, he was an assistant coach of the New York Rangers.

Lacroix was hired by the Montreal Canadiens on July 30, 2014, as an assistant coach and served in the role until 2018.

On October 18, 2018, Lithuanian Ice Hockey Federation appointed Lacroix as head coach of men's national team on one-year contract.

On January 21, 2019, Kölner Haie from the Deutsche Eishockey Liga (DEL) announced Lacroix to be their head coach for the rest of the season after the firing of Peter Draisaitl.

== Career statistics ==
=== Regular season and playoffs ===
			Regular season					Playoffs
Season	Team	League	GP	G	A	Pts	PIM	GP	G	A	Pts	PIM
1985–86	Outaouais Frontaliers	QAAA	37	10	13	23	46	—	—	—	—	—
1986–87	Granby Bisons	QMJHL	54	9	16	25	311	8	1	2	3	22
1987–88	Granby Bisons	QMJHL	58	24	50	74	466	5	0	4	4	12
1988–89	Granby Bisons	QMJHL	70	45	49	94	320	4	1	1	2	57
1988–89	Denver Rangers	IHL	2	0	1	1	0	2	0	1	1	0
1989–90	Flint Spirits	IHL	61	12	16	28	128	4	2	0	2	24
1990–91	Binghamton Rangers	AHL	54	7	12	19	237	5	1	0	1	24
1991–92	Binghamton Rangers	AHL	52	12	20	32	149	11	2	4	6	28
1992–93	Binghamton Rangers	AHL	73	21	22	43	255	—	—	—	—	—
1993–94	New York Rangers	NHL	4	0	0	0	0	—	—	—	—	—
1993–94	Binghamton Rangers	AHL	59	20	23	43	278	—	—	—	—	—
1994–95	Providence Bruins	AHL	40	15	11	26	266	—	—	—	—	—
1994–95	Boston Bruins	NHL	23	1	0	1	38	—	—	—	—	—
1994–95	New York Rangers	NHL	1	0	0	0	0	—	—	—	—	—
1995–96	New York Rangers	NHL	25	2	2	4	30	—	—	—	—	—
1995–96	Binghamton Rangers	AHL	26	12	15	27	155	—	—	—	—	—
1996–97	Philadelphia Flyers	NHL	74	7	1	8	163	12	0	1	1	22
1997–98	Philadelphia Flyers	NHL	56	1	4	5	135	4	0	0	0	4
1998–99	Edmonton Oilers	NHL	4	0	0	0	13	—	—	—	—	—
1998–99	Hamilton Bulldogs	AHL	46	13	9	22	260	11	3	1	4	65
1999–00	New York Islanders	NHL	1	0	0	0	0	—	—	—	—	—
1999–00	Chicago Wolves	IHL	61	3	10	13	194	7	0	0	0	28
2000–01	Newcastle Jesters	BISL	42	8	11	19	140	—	—	—	—	—
2001–02	Blitz de Granby	QSPHL	10	4	4	8	72	—	—	—	—	—
2001–02	Atlantic City Boardwalk Bullies	ECHL	31	5	13	18	166	10	5	4	9	89
2001–02	Rochester Americans	AHL	2	1	0	1	18	—	—	—	—	—
AHL totals			352	101	112	213	1618	27	6	5	11	117
NHL totals			188	11	7	18	379	16	0	1	1	26
