= Capital District Islanders =

Former professional minor league ice hockey team in Troy, New York

- City: Troy, New York
- League: American Hockey League
- Operated: 1990–1993
- Home arena: Houston Field House
- Colors: Blue, orange and white
- Affiliates: New York Islanders

Franchise history
- 1971–1974: Boston Braves
- 1990–1993: Capital District Islanders
- 1993–2010: Albany River Rats
- 2010–present: Charlotte Checkers

The Capital District Islanders were a team in the American Hockey League (AHL) based in Troy, New York, which is located within a region popularly called the Capital District. The team was established within the territorial rights of the Adirondack Red Wings, an existing AHL team in Glens Falls, and had to negotiate an indemnity agreement with the Red Wings before beginning play in the 1990–91 season. The Capital District Islanders were the principal minor league affiliate of the National Hockey League's New York Islanders, coached by former Islanders player Butch Goring, and played at the Houston Field House on the campus of Rensselaer Polytechnic Institute. Prior to the start of the 1993–94 season, the franchise relocated to the capital city of Albany and became the Albany River Rats.

== History ==
=== Background ===
The Capital District Islanders were born out of an effort to attract a professional hockey team into Albany's newly built Knickerbocker Arena. In May 1989, Albany County Executive Jim Coyne formed the Committee to Bring Pro Hockey to Albany, which was chaired by former Rensselaer Polytechnic Institute (RPI) men's ice hockey head coach Mike Addesa. The committee disbanded in January 1990 when it opted to withdraw its support of a bid for an International Hockey League (IHL) franchise made by businessman Ben Fernandez and instead backed a bid made by Michael Cantanucci. A native of Troy, Cantanucci owned a group of auto dealerships located at exit 15 of the Adirondack Northway and took interest to the sport after his son began playing youth hockey. (Note: Cantanucci's son Jared went on to play college hockey for the Harvard Crimson (1998–2001) and professional hockey for the Adirondack IceHawks (2001–2002).)

Pro hockey teams in the Capital District (1990–91)
1 Adirondack Red Wings (AHL)
2 Capital District Islanders (AHL)
3 Albany Choppers (IHL)

Cantanucci decided to make his own bid for a franchise because Fernandez did not have an interest in having partners as investors. Addesa began working with Cantanucci, who was also an original member of the Committee to Bring Pro Hockey to Albany, and he also knew through Cantanucci's support of the RPI hockey and football programs. However, Cantanucci asked to withdraw his bid for an IHL team when the proposed Global Hockey League (GHL) awarded a franchise to Albany on February 1, 1990. Before that, he had also explored the possibility of obtaining an American Hockey League (AHL) franchise, and had discussions with the Detroit Red Wings of the National Hockey League (NHL) about allowing another AHL team to play in the Knickerbocker Arena, as they held territorial rights within a 50-mile (80 km) distance of their Adirondack Red Wings AHL franchise based in Glens Falls. In March 1990, Cantanucci initiated a marketing study of Capital District residents to assess how adding an AHL team in Troy would impact an AHL team in Glens Falls, the results of which supported his position that AHL teams in both cities could co-exist.

=== AHL comes to the Capital District ===
In May 1990, the Detroit Red Wings denied permission to move the AHL's Sherbrooke Canadiens to Troy. However, the Red Wings' opposition to allowing another AHL franchise to play in the Capital District changed just one month later, after the Fort Wayne Komets of the IHL relocated to become the Albany Choppers, signing a lease to begin playing in the Knickerbocker Arena for the 1990–91 season; this move followed a decision made in May by the owners of the Albany GHL franchise not to join the proposed league. Cantanucci quickly negotiated a deal with Red Wings' Executive Vice-President Jim Lites that offered protection against the IHL and a professional hockey team in the Knickerbocker Arena, gave the Red Wings a return on their investment, and created a new AHL rivalry between Glens Falls and Troy.

To obtain permission for an AHL franchise in the Capital District, Cantanucci had to make a $1 million payment to Red Wings as well as agree to pay for a ten-year period an annual fee of $50,000 plus a percentage of revenue obtained from ticket and parking sales. The additional revenue included paying the Red Wings 35 cents for each ticket sold (with the rate increasing by 4 cents each year) and 50 cents for each parking fee paid (with the rate increasing by 5 cents each year). The 40-page document also included a clause that prohibited the new AHL franchise from moving to Knickerbocker Arena.

After Cantanucci was unable to obtain a corporate loan to cover the $1 million indemnity payment that was due to the Red Wings, the City of Troy agreed to lend the team the money. The city applied for a loan from the United States Department of Housing and Urban Development (HUD), but didn't receive a timely response and ended up using Community Development Block Grant funds to provide the team with a loan. HUD later rejected the loan application and indicated that the city's transfer of federal funds was not permissible and needed to be returned. The city instead turned to private financing to provide the team with a total loan of $1.5 million; this was combined with a loan used to construct the city's Knickerbacker Arena in North Troy. (Note: The Knickerbacker Arena is located in Troy (not to be confused with the venue in Albany formerly known as the Knickerbocker Arena).) (Note: On October 21, 1991, Troy city officials and Capital District Islanders vice-president Kevin Earl testified before the Employment and Housing Subcommittee of the Committee on Government Operations at a congressional hearing on the misuse of HUD Community Development Block Grant funds.)

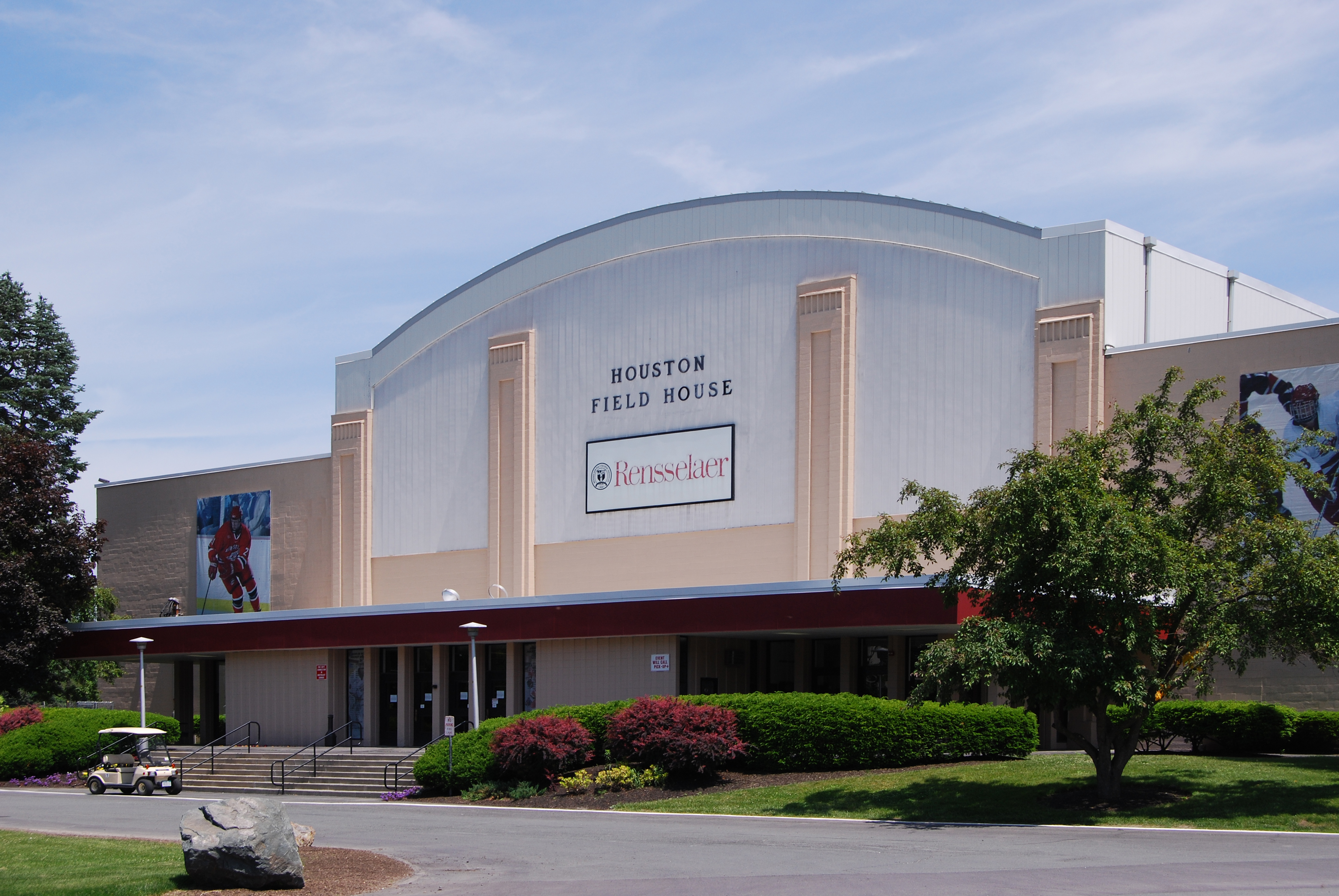
The Houston Field House in Troy, on the campus of Rensselaer Polytechnic Institute

Instead of establishing an expansion franchise, Cantanucci purchased the rights of the Boston Braves, a dormant AHL franchise that had been inactive since 1974. (Note: The dormant franchise was purchased for $500,000, which was less than the $750,000 fee to establish an expansion franchise.) The new team would play at the Houston Field House in Troy, on the campus of RPI, which had a capacity of 5,203 seats and had been renovated in 1985. It quickly secured an affiliation with the NHL's New York Islanders, bringing with them most of the players who had been on the Calder Cup champion Springfield Indians the previous year. The team was named the "Capital District Islanders" in an attempt to draw fans from the entire Capital District, not just from Troy. The new team's uniforms and logo were identical to those of their affiliate, except that the logo had "Capital District" written above it. The team had originally planned to replace the "NY" in the crest with a "CD" but didn't like any of the prototypes. (Note: The team had also considered putting a map of the Capital District in its logo.)

=== Years in Troy (1990–1993) ===
The team's head coach for all three seasons was Butch Goring, a former NHL veteran who won four Stanley Cups with the New York Islanders during the early 1980s and had later served as head coach of the NHL's Boston Bruins and the Western International Hockey League's Spokane Chiefs before his arrival in Troy. The announcement of Goring's appointment as head coach was made on August 17, 1990, after Jimmy Roberts—the AHL coach of the year for the previous season—declined an offer from New York Islanders general manager Bill Torrey to move from the Springfield Indians after the change in affiliation.

The Capital District Islanders and Albany Choppers both struggled on the ice and at the box office in their first season. (Note: The Capital District Islanders tried to improve their success at the box office in their first year by scheduling 31 of their 40 home games on weekends and all four dates against the rival Adirondack Red Wings early on in the season.) The Islanders drew a total of 101,592 fans to the Houston Field House over 40 home games (an average attendance of 2,540), while the Choppers drew a total of 70,100 fans to the Knickerbocker Arena over 30 home games (an average attendance of 2,337) before the team folded midseason. Many of the tickets to Islanders games were given away for free to boost attendance and make the franchise appear stronger compared to the Choppers. On 13 occasions the Islanders had more freebies than paid admissions; the team only had an average paid attendance of 1,113. The Capital District Islanders lost over $500,000 in their first year. Meanwhile, the presence of the Choppers and the Islanders did not have much of an effect on the Adirondack Red Wings during the 1990–91 season, which only experienced an 11.5 percent reduction in attendance; this roughly correlated with the percentage of the Red Wings' fanbase residing south of the Twin Bridges and in Clifton Park.

David Hanson took over as the team's general manager before the start of the second season. He replaced Kevin Earl, who had been a football coach at RPI and a car salesman for Cantanucci, with Earl being named vice-president and focused on ticket sales and promotions. Cantanucci originally wanted Ned Harkness to take over operations of the team, but Harkness desired to remain in his position as president of the Olympic Regional Development Authority, and instead became a part owner of the team with control of its operations. He recommended Hanson to handle day-to-day operations, who was a former hockey player and had been serving under him as the general manager of the Gore Mountain Ski Area since 1984. (Note: Harkness' career had included stints as general manager of the Detroit Red Wings (1971–74) and Adirondack Red Wings (1979–82). He had also been the head coach of the RPI men's ice hockey team, during which he helped to open the Houston Field House and won the 1954 NCAA Championship.) (Note: Hanson had played two seasons for the Adirondack Red Wings while Harkness was the team's general manager. He won the Calder Cup with the team during the 1980–81 season and served as the team's captain during the 1981–82 season.)

Cantanucci ended up selling the franchise to local insurance magnate Albert Lawrence prior to the start of the 1991–92 season. In their second year, the Islanders changed their radio affiliate from WABY-AM to WPTR-AM; WPTR had previously carried the Albany Choppers games during the previous season and had a more powerful signal that extended beyond the Capital District. The front office originally planned to replace Mike Haynes as the team's broadcaster, but Haynes ended up staying on and served as the team's play-by-play announcer for its radio broadcasts for all three seasons. The team also moved its office to a storefront at 275 River Street in downtown Troy to make staff more accessible to the public. (Note: The Capital District Islanders' office was previously located in a trailer next to the Houston Field House.) The Islanders' average attendance dropped to 2,062 for the 1991–92 season, but this was closer to the average paid attendance and represented an improvement compared to the team's inaugural season.

In April 1992, the Capital District Islanders filed a $10 million lawsuit against the Detroit Red Wings and the AHL, claiming that the league's 50-mile (80 km) exclusive zone violated antitrust laws and that the territorial indemnity agreement between the teams was unfair. The suit also accused the Adirondack Red Wings of instigating fights that led to injuries of Capital District Islanders players—citing incidents with Kevin Cheveldayoff, Dean Trboyevich, and Graeme Townshend—and claimed that the team knew of Barry Melrose's "vicious and violent nature" when they hired him as their head coach. According to Lawrence, the incident involving Townshend was the tipping point in the matter. In a game on March 13, 1992, Max Middendorf intentionally hit Townshend in the face with his stick, breaking Townshend's nose and fracturing his sinus cavity, and later received an 11-game suspension from the AHL. Lawrence considered pressing for criminal charges against Middendorf, but Townshend did not want to file a complaint. Others said that the accusations of deliberate intent to injure players were just meant to be a deception or give leverage because Lawrence's main objective was to eliminate or seek more favorable terms in the indemnity agreement with the Red Wings that had been negotiated by Cantanucci.

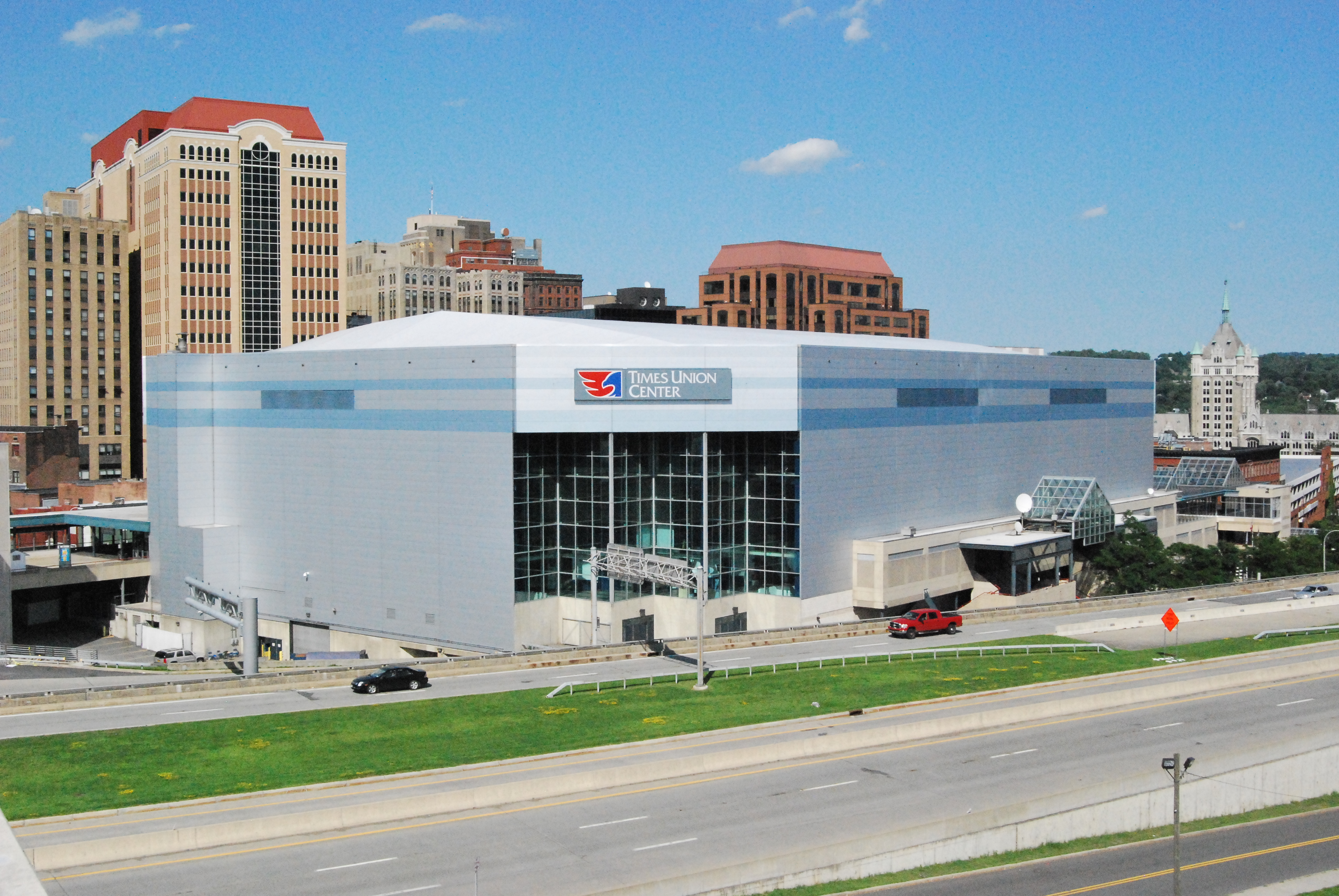
The Knickerbocker Arena in Albany (shown in 2011 as the Times Union Center)

The case was settled out of court in October 1992. In exchange for the Islanders agreeing to drop the lawsuit, the Red Wings agreed to remove a clause in the territorial indemnity agreement that prohibited the Islanders from moving to the Knickerbocker Arena and also cut in half the annual payments that the Islanders were making to the Red Wings, which came to about $100,000 in the prior season. The Red Wings explained that they ended up settling the case for hockey's best interest, as a court ruling on the antitrust grounds could have had implications on the AHL and the NHL. Lites said, "Our partners in the league were telling us that the suit was costing them a lot of money and it wasn't worth it."

The Islanders' best record was in the 1992–93 season, when the team finished 34-34-12 for third place in its division and a playoff berth. Among the team's notable players were Greg Parks, its leading career scorer in only one and a half seasons; forwards Richard Kromm and Brent Grieve, defensemen Dennis Vaske, Jeff Finley and Dean Chynoweth and goaltender Danny Lorenz. The team's general manager, who had appeared in the movie Slap Shot as one of the three Hanson Brothers, organized a reunion of the trio before the Capital District Islanders game on April 3, 1993 that sold out the Houston Field House and also drew national attention; the event also included an appearance by Gordie Howe, who was making a 65-city tour to celebrate his 65th birthday.

=== Relocation to Albany ===
Following the conclusion of the 1992–93 season, Lawrence moved the franchise to Albany's 15,000-seat Knickerbocker Arena (the same venue in which the Choppers played during the 1990–91 season), changed the affiliation to the New Jersey Devils, and renamed the team the Albany River Rats. Meanwhile, the New York Islanders changed their minor league affiliate to the Salt Lake Golden Eagles of the IHL for the 1993–94 season.

General manager David Hanson felt that creating a new identity for the team—including a unique nickname—was important for marketing purposes. Bob Dittmeier from The Daily Gazette speculated that one of the problems with the previous name of the franchise was its close association with the New York Islanders, which might have prevented New York Rangers fans from supporting the Capital District Islanders out of loyalty to the Rangers due to the Islanders–Rangers rivalry.

In June 1995, after the Albany River Rats had turned into a successful franchise and had just won the Calder Cup, the City of Troy sued the team over the legality of the $1.5 million loan that it had made to the Capital District Islanders, contesting that it violated the New York State Constitution by using public funds to benefit a privately held company and that the city was not obligated to repay the debt. The City of Troy reached a settlement with Massachusetts Financial Services (MFS) in 1997, agreeing to reduce its debt by $1.5 million and paying the remaining balance of the loan to MFS using the proceeds of bonds sold by the city's Municipal Assistance Corporation. Three years later, the City of Troy settled its remaining claims for damages from the Albany River Rats and the bond counsel firm that had advised the city on the original deal, collecting a total sum of $345,000. (Note: Lawrence filed for bankruptcy in 1997 and his shares of the team were sold the following year in a court auction; Troy's lawsuit against the River Rats was an issue in Lawrence's bankruptcy case.)

== Season-by-season results ==
Regular season

Season	Games	Won	Lost	Tied	Points	Goals for	Goals against	Standing
1990–91	80	28	43	9	65	284	323	7th, South
1991–92	80	32	37	11	75	261	289	4th, North
1992–93	80	34	34	12	80	280	285	3rd, North

Playoffs

Season	1st round	2nd round	3rd round	Finals
1990–91	Out of playoffs			
1991–92	L, 3-4, Springfield	—	—	—
1992–93	L, 0-4, Adirondack	—	—	—

== Team records ==
Single season
Goals: 41 Iain Fraser (1992–93)
Assists: 69 Iain Fraser (1992–93)
Points: 110 Iain Fraser (1992–93)
Penalty Minutes: 203 Kevin Cheveldayoff (1990–91)
GAA: 3.23 Jamie McLennan (1992–93)

Career
Goals: 82 Brent Grieve
Assists: 109 Richard Kromm
Points: 168 Greg Parks
Penalty Minutes: 537 Dean Chynoweth
Games: 231 Richard Kromm
