= 1987–88 WHL season =

Junior ice hockey season

- League: Western Hockey League
- Sport: Ice hockey
- Teams: 14

Regular season
- Scotty Munro Memorial Trophy: Saskatoon Blades (3)
- Season MVP: Joe Sakic (Swift Current Broncos)
- Top scorer: Joe Sakic (Swift Current Broncos)

Playoffs
- Finals champions: Medicine Hat Tigers (3)
- Runners-up: Kamloops Blazers

WHL seasons
- 1986–87 1988–89

1987–88 CHL season
- League: Canadian Hockey League
- Sport: Ice hockey
- Teams: 39

OHL

QMJHL

WHL

Memorial Cup
- Finals champions: Medicine Hat Tigers (WHL) (2nd title)
- Runners-up: Windsor Spitfires (OHL)

The 1987–88 WHL season was the 22nd season of the Western Hockey League (WHL), featuring fourteen teams and a 72-game season. The Saskatoon Blades won their third Scotty Munro Memorial Trophy for best regular season record. In the playoffs, the Medicine Hat Tigers won their second consecutive President's Cup, defeating the Kamloops Blazers in the championship series. The Tigers advanced to the 1988 Memorial Cup tournament, where they won their second straight Memorial Cup title.

The season was the first for the Lethbridge Hurricanes, after the Calgary Wranglers relocated to Lethbridge prior to the season. The Hurricanes brought WHL hockey back to the city after the Broncos returned to Swift Current in 1986.

== Team changes ==
- The Calgary Wranglers relocate to Lethbridge, Alberta, becoming the Lethbridge Hurricanes.

== Regular season ==
=== Final standings ===
East Division
Pos	Team	Pld	W	L	T	GF	GA	Pts
1	x – Saskatoon Blades	72	47	22	3	381	294	97
2	x – Medicine Hat Tigers	72	44	22	6	353	261	94
3	x – Prince Albert Raiders	72	43	24	5	373	284	91
4	x – Swift Current Broncos	72	44	26	2	388	312	90
5	x – Regina Pats	72	39	29	4	342	286	82
6	x – Brandon Wheat Kings	72	26	43	3	348	371	55
7	Lethbridge Hurricanes	72	20	48	4	257	356	44
8	Moose Jaw Warriors	72	18	52	2	308	458	38

x – qualified for playoffs

West Division
Pos	Team	Pld	W	L	T	GF	GA	Pts
1	x – Kamloops Blazers	72	45	26	1	399	307	91
2	x – Spokane Chiefs	72	37	32	3	330	296	77
3	x – Victoria Cougars	72	37	34	1	346	335	75
4	x – New Westminster Bruins	72	33	34	5	338	358	71
5	Seattle Thunderbirds	72	25	45	2	313	436	52
6	Portland Winter Hawks	72	24	45	3	328	449	51

x – qualified for playoffs

=== Scoring leaders ===
Note: GP = Games played; G = Goals; A = Assists; Pts = Points; PIM = Penalties in minutes

Player	Team	GP	G	A	Pts	PIM
Joe Sakic	Swift Current Broncos	64	78	82	160	64
Theoren Fleury	Moose Jaw Warriors	65	68	92	160	235
Mark Recchi	Kamloops Blazers	62	61	93	154	75
Troy Mick	Portland Winter Hawks	72	63	84	147	78
Dennis Holland	Portland Winter Hawks	67	58	86	144	115
Terry Yake	Brandon Wheat Kings	72	55	85	140	59
Craig Endean	Regina Pats	69	50	86	136	50
Greg Hawgood	Kamloops Blazers	63	48	85	133	142
Trevor Jobe	Prince Albert Raiders	72	69	63	132	111
Mike Modano	Prince Albert Raiders	65	47	80	127	80

== 1988 WHL Playoffs ==
=== First round ===
- Saskatoon earned a bye
- Medicine Hat earned a bye
- Prince Albert defeated Brandon 3 games to 1
- Swift Current defeated Regina 3 games to 1

=== Division semi-finals ===
- Saskatoon defeated Swift Current 4 games to 2
- Medicine Hat defeated Prince Albert 4 games to 2
- Kamloops defeated New Westminster 5 games to 0
- Spokane defeated Victoria 5 games to 3

=== Division finals ===
- Medicine Hat defeated Saskatoon 4 games to 0
- Kamloops defeated Spokane 5 games to 2

=== WHL Championship ===
- Medicine Hat defeated Kamloops 4 games to 2

== All-Star game ==
On January 12, the East Division defeated the West Division 5–4 at Kamloops, British Columbia before a crowd of 2,689.

== WHL awards ==
Most Valuable Player - Four Broncos Memorial Trophy: Joe Sakic, Swift Current Broncos
Scholastic Player of the Year - Daryl K. (Doc) Seaman Trophy: Kevin Cheveldayoff, Brandon Wheat Kings
Top Scorer - Bob Clarke Trophy: Joe Sakic, Swift Current Broncos
Most Sportsmanlike Player - Brad Hornung Trophy: Craig Endean, Regina Pats
Top Defenseman - Bill Hunter Trophy: Greg Hawgood, Kamloops Blazers
Rookie of the Year - Jim Piggott Memorial Trophy: Stu Barnes, New Westminster Bruins
Top Goaltender - Del Wilson Trophy: Troy Gamble, Spokane Chiefs
Coach of the Year - Dunc McCallum Memorial Trophy: Marcel Comeau, Saskatoon Blades
Executive of the Year - Lloyd Saunders Memorial Trophy: Jim Loria, Spokane Chiefs
Regular season Champions - Scotty Munro Memorial Trophy: Saskatoon Blades
WHL Plus-Minus Award: Mark Recchi, Kamloops Blazers

== All-Star teams ==
East Division
	First Team		Second team	
Goal	Tim Cheveldae	Saskatoon Blades	Mark Fitzpatrick	Medicine Hat Tigers
Defense	Curtis Leschyshyn	Saskatoon Blades	Dean Kolstad	Prince Albert Raiders
Defense	Scott McCrady	Medicine Hat Tigers	Rich Pilon	Prince Albert Raiders
Center	Joe Sakic	Swift Current Broncos	Theoren Fleury	Moose Jaw Warriors
Left wing	Grant Tkachuk	Saskatoon Blades	Mark Pederson	Medicine Hat Tigers
Right wing	Craig Endean	Regina Pats	Trevor Linden	Medicine Hat Tigers
West Division
	First Team		Second team	
Goal	Troy Gamble	Spokane Chiefs	unknown	
Defense	Greg Hawgood	Kamloops Blazers	unknown	
Defense	Jayson More (tied)	New Westminster Bruins	unknown	
Defense	Andrew Wolf (tied)	Victoria Cougars	unknown	
Center	Dennis Holland	Portland Winter Hawks	unknown	
Left wing	Troy Mick (tied)	Portland Winter Hawks	unknown	
Left wing	Darcy Norton (tied)	Kamloops Blazers	unknown	
Right wing	Mark Recchi	Kamloops Blazers	unknown	

== See also ==
- 1988 NHL entry draft
- 1987 in sports
- 1988 in sports

Preceded by 1986–87 WHL season	WHL seasons	Succeeded by 1988–89 WHL season
