= 1985–86 WHL season =

Junior ice hockey season

- League: Western Hockey League
- Sport: Ice hockey
- Teams: 14

Regular season
- Scotty Munro Memorial Trophy: Medicine Hat Tigers (1)
- Season MVP: Rob Brown (Kamloops Blazers) / Manny Viveiros (Prince Albert Raiders)
- Top scorer: Rob Brown (Kamloops Blazers)

Playoffs
- Finals champions: Kamloops Blazers (2)
- Runners-up: Medicine Hat Tigers

WHL seasons
- 1984–85 1986–87

1985–86 CHL season
- League: Canadian Hockey League
- Sport: Ice hockey
- Teams: 39

OHL

QMJHL

WHL

Memorial Cup
- Finals champions: Guelph Platers (OHL) (1st title)
- Runners-up: Hull Olympiques (QMJHL)

The 1985–86 WHL season was the 20th season of the Western Hockey League (WHL). It featured fourteen teams and a 72-game regular season. The Medicine Hat Tigers captured their first Scotty Munro Memorial Trophy for the best regular season record, while the Kamloops Blazers won their second President's Cup as playoff champions.

The season was the first for the Spokane Chiefs, with the Kelowna Wings relocating to Spokane, Washington prior to the season. The Chiefs became the third American-based WHL team. In addition, the Seattle Breakers were renamed the Thunderbirds.

== Team changes ==
- The Kelowna Wings relocated to Spokane, Washington, becoming the Spokane Chiefs.
- The Seattle Breakers are renamed the Seattle Thunderbirds.

== Regular season ==
=== Final standings ===
East Division
Pos	Team	Pld	W	L	T	GF	GA	Pts
1	x – Medicine Hat Tigers	72	54	17	1	384	245	109
2	x – Prince Albert Raiders	72	52	17	3	424	257	107
3	x – Regina Pats	72	45	26	1	384	295	91
4	x – Saskatoon Blades	72	38	28	6	381	360	82
5	x – Lethbridge Broncos	72	27	42	3	314	379	57
6	x – Moose Jaw Warriors	72	25	44	3	294	375	53
7	Brandon Wheat Kings	72	24	46	2	324	438	50
8	Calgary Wranglers	72	23	47	2	288	378	48

x – qualified for playoffs

West Division
Pos	Team	Pld	W	L	T	GF	GA	Pts
1	x – Kamloops Blazers	72	49	19	4	449	299	102
2	x – Portland Winter Hawks	72	47	24	1	438	348	95
3	x – Spokane Chiefs	72	30	41	1	373	413	61
4	x – Seattle Thunderbirds	72	27	43	2	330	406	56
5	New Westminster Bruins	72	25	45	2	276	373	52
6	Victoria Cougars	72	22	49	1	346	439	45

x – qualified for playoffs

=== Scoring leaders ===
Note: GP = Games played; G = Goals; A = Assists; Pts = Points; PIM = Penalties in minutes

Player	Team	GP	G	A	Pts	PIM
Rob Brown	Kamloops Blazers	69	58	115	173	171
Simon Wheeldon	Victoria Cougars	70	61	96	157	85
Ken Morrison	Kamloops Blazers/Prince Albert Raiders	72	83	67	150	65
Randy Smith	Saskatoon Blades	70	60	86	146	44
Ken Priestlay	Victoria Cougars	72	73	72	145	45
Rod Matechuk	Saskatoon Blades	72	57	78	135	93
Ray Podloski	Portland Winter Hawks	66	59	75	134	69
Mike Nottingham	Kamloops Blazers	70	61	70	131	101
Craig Endean	Seattle Thunderbirds	70	58	70	128	34
Dave Waldie	Portland Winter Hawks	72	68	58	126	63

== 1986 WHL Playoffs ==
=== First round ===
The East division played a round robin format amongst the top six teams:

- Prince Albert (9–1) advanced
- Medicine Hat (8–2) advanced
- Saskatoon (7–3) advanced
- Moose Jaw (4–6) advanced
- Lethbridge (1–9) eliminated
- Regina (1–9) eliminated

=== Division semi-finals ===
- Medicine Hat defeated Moose Jaw 3 games to 0
- Prince Albert defeated Saskatoon 3 games to 0
- Kamloops defeated Seattle 5 games to 0
- Portland defeated Spokane 5 games to 4

=== Division finals ===
- Medicine Hat defeated Prince Albert 4 games to 3
- Kamloops defeated Portland 5 games to 1

=== WHL Championship ===
- Kamloops defeated Medicine Hat 4 games to 1

== All-Star games ==
On January 20, the Portland Winter Hawks defeated the West All-Stars 4–3 in Portland, Oregon before a crowd of 3,106. On January 21, the East All-Stars defeated the Prince Albert Raiders 6–3 in Prince Albert, Saskatchewan before a crowd of 1,475.

== WHL awards ==
- Note: In some cases, the WHL handed out separate awards for the East and West divisions.

Most Valuable Player: East: Emanuel Viveiros, Prince Albert Raiders; West: Rob Brown, Kamloops Blazers
Scholastic Player of the Year - Daryl K. (Doc) Seaman Trophy: Mark Janssens, Regina Pats
Top Scorer - Bob Clarke Trophy: Rob Brown, Kamloops Blazers
Most Sportsmanlike Player: East: Randy Smith, Saskatoon Blades; Ken Morrison, Kamloops Blazers
Top Defenseman - Bill Hunter Trophy: East: Emanuel Viveiros, Prince Albert Raiders; West: Glen Wesley, Portland Winter Hawks
Rookie of the Year - Jim Piggott Memorial Trophy: East: Neil Brady, Medicine Hat Tigers; West: (tie) Ron Shudra, Kamloops Blazers and Dave Waldie, Portland Winter Hawks
Top Goaltender - Del Wilson Trophy: Mark Fitzpatrick, Medicine Hat Tigers
Coach of the Year - Dunc McCallum Memorial Trophy: Terry Simpson, Prince Albert Raiders
Regular season champions - Scotty Munro Memorial Trophy: Medicine Hat Tigers

== All-Star teams ==
East Division
	First Team		Second Team	
Goal	Darryl Gilmour	Moose Jaw Warriors	Mark Fitzpatrick	Medicine Hat Tigers
Defense	Emanuel Viveiros	Prince Albert Raiders	Robert Dirk	Regina Pats
Defense	Ken Spangler	Calgary Wranglers	Dave Manson	Prince Albert Raiders
Center	Al Conroy	Medicine Hat Tigers	Randy Smith	Saskatoon Blades
Left Wing	Tim Iannone	Regina Pats	Larry DePalma	Saskatoon Blades
Right Wing	Pat Elynuik	Prince Albert Raiders	Kim Issel	Prince Albert Raiders
West Division
	First Team		Second Team	
Goal	Larry Dyck	Seattle Thunderbirds	Bill Ranford	New Westminster Bruins
Defense	Glen Wesley	Portland Winter Hawks	Mike Berger	Spokane Chiefs
Defense	Jim Agnew (tied)	Portland Winter Hawks	Ron Shudra	Kamloops Blazers
Defense	Greg Hawgood (tied)	Kamloops Blazers	-	-
Center	Rob Brown	Kamloops Blazers	Simon Wheeldon	Victoria Cougars
Left Wing	Dave Waldie	Portland Winter Hawks	Ken Priestlay	Victoria Cougars
Right Wing	Ken Morrison	Kamloops Blazers	Terry Perkins	Spokane Chiefs

== See also ==
- 1986 Memorial Cup
- 1986 NHL entry draft
- 1985 in sports
- 1986 in sports

Preceded by 1984–85 WHL season	WHL seasons	Succeeded by 1986–87 WHL season
