= 1986–87 WHL season =

Junior ice hockey season

- League: Western Hockey League
- Sport: Ice hockey
- Teams: 14

Regular season
- Scotty Munro Memorial Trophy: Kamloops Blazers (2)
- Season MVP: Rob Brown (Kamloops Blazers) / Joe Sakic (Swift Current Broncos)
- Top scorer: Rob Brown (Kamloops Blazers)

Playoffs
- Finals champions: Medicine Hat Tigers (2)
- Runners-up: Portland Winter Hawks

WHL seasons
- 1985–86 1987–88

1986–87 CHL season
- League: Canadian Hockey League
- Sport: Ice hockey
- Teams: 39

OHL

QMJHL

WHL

Memorial Cup
- Finals champions: Medicine Hat Tigers (WHL) (1st title)
- Runners-up: Oshawa Generals (OHL)

The 1986–87 WHL season was the 21st season of the Western Hockey League (WHL). While the Kamloops Blazers won their second Scotty Munro Memorial Trophy as regular season champions, the Medicine Hat Tigers won the President's Cup as playoff champions before going on to win the 1987 Memorial Cup tournament.

The season saw the return of the Swift Current Broncos, with the Lethbridge Broncos relocating prior to the start of the season.

== League notes ==
- On December 30, 1986, the Swift Current Broncos bus crash caused the deaths of four members of the Broncos: Trent Kresse, Scott Kruger, Chris Mantyka, and Brent Ruff. Despite the tragedy, the Broncos opted to continue playing for the remainder of the season. The WHL would later rename its Most Valuable Player award the Four Broncos Memorial Trophy in honour of the four players who were killed in the crash.
- On March 1, 1987, Regina Pats player Brad Hornung was paralyzed during a game by a body check. In 1988, the WHL renamed its Most Sportsmanlike Player award—previously the Frank Boucher Memorial Trophy—the Brad Hornung Trophy in his honor. The incident also led to a rule change, making body checking from behind illegal.
- Rob Brown established a league record with a 212-point season for the Kamloops Blazers. In a season where the league awarded Most Valuable Player honours to a player from each of the East and West Divisions, Brown shared the MVP title with the Broncos' Joe Sakic.

== Team changes ==
- The Lethbridge Broncos relocate to Swift Current, Saskatchewan, becoming the Swift Current Broncos.

== Regular season ==
=== Final standings ===
East Division
| Pos | Team | Pld | W | L | T | GF | GA | Pts |
|---|---|---|---|---|---|---|---|---|
| 1 | x – Medicine Hat Tigers | 72 | 48 | 19 | 5 | 383 | 264 | 101 |
| 2 | x – Saskatoon Blades | 72 | 44 | 26 | 2 | 369 | 282 | 90 |
| 3 | x – Prince Albert Raiders | 72 | 43 | 26 | 3 | 346 | 264 | 89 |
| 4 | x – Moose Jaw Warriors | 72 | 38 | 31 | 3 | 366 | 321 | 79 |
| 5 | x – Regina Pats | 72 | 31 | 37 | 4 | 332 | 356 | 66 |
| 6 | x – Swift Current Broncos | 72 | 28 | 40 | 4 | 331 | 393 | 60 |
| 7 | Calgary Wranglers | 72 | 23 | 46 | 3 | 304 | 390 | 49 |
| 8 | Brandon Wheat Kings | 72 | 19 | 49 | 4 | 282 | 443 | 42 |

x – qualified for playoffs

West Division
| Pos | Team | Pld | W | L | T | GF | GA | Pts |
|---|---|---|---|---|---|---|---|---|
| 1 | x – Kamloops Blazers | 72 | 55 | 14 | 3 | 496 | 292 | 113 |
| 2 | x – Portland Winter Hawks | 72 | 47 | 23 | 2 | 439 | 355 | 96 |
| 3 | x – Spokane Chiefs | 72 | 37 | 33 | 2 | 374 | 350 | 76 |
| 4 | x – Victoria Cougars | 72 | 30 | 41 | 1 | 334 | 412 | 61 |
| 5 | Seattle Thunderbirds | 72 | 21 | 47 | 4 | 328 | 430 | 46 |
| 6 | New Westminster Bruins | 72 | 18 | 50 | 4 | 300 | 432 | 40 |

x – qualified for playoffs

=== Scoring leaders ===
Note: GP = Games played; G = Goals; A = Assists; Pts = Points; PIM = Penalties in minutes

| Player | Team | GP | G | A | Pts | PIM |
|---|---|---|---|---|---|---|
| Rob Brown | Kamloops Blazers | 63 | 76 | 136 | 212 | 101 |
| Craig Endean | Regina Pats | 72 | 69 | 77 | 146 | 34 |
| Len Nielsen | Regina Pats | 72 | 36 | 100 | 136 | 32 |
| Joe Sakic | Swift Current Broncos | 72 | 60 | 73 | 133 | 31 |
| Theoren Fleury | Moose Jaw Warriors | 66 | 61 | 68 | 129 | 110 |
| Adam Morrison | Victoria Cougars | 65 | 55 | 70 | 125 | 57 |
| Greg Hawgood | Kamloops Blazers | 61 | 30 | 93 | 123 | 139 |
| Ron Shudra | Kamloops Blazers | 71 | 49 | 70 | 119 | 68 |
| Robin Bawa | Kamloops Blazers | 62 | 57 | 62 | 113 | 91 |
| Pat Elynuik | Prince Albert Raiders | 64 | 51 | 62 | 113 | 40 |

== 1987 WHL Playoffs ==
=== First round ===
- Medicine Hat earned a bye
- Saskatoon earned a bye
- Prince Albert defeated Swift Current 3 games to 1
- Moose Jaw defeated Regina 3 games to 0

=== Division semi-finals ===
- Medicine Hat defeated Moose Jaw 4 games to 2
- Saskatoon defeated Prince Albert 4 games to 0
- Kamloops defeated Victoria 5 games to 0
- Portland defeated Spokane 5 games to 0

=== Division finals ===
- Medicine Hat defeated Saskatoon 4 games to 3
- Portland defeated Kamloops 5 games to 3

=== WHL Championship ===
- Medicine Hat defeated Portland 4 games to 3

== All-Star game ==
On January 20, the East Division defeated the West Division 4–3 at Regina, Saskatchewan with a crowd of 3,652.

== WHL awards ==
- Note: For the 1986–87 season, the WHL handed out separate awards for the East and West Divisions.

Most Valuable Player - Four Broncos Memorial Trophy: East: Joe Sakic, Swift Current Broncos; West: Rob Brown, Kamloops Blazers
Scholastic Player of the Year - Daryl K. (Doc) Seaman Trophy: Casey McMilan, Swift Current Broncos
Top Scorer - Bob Clarke Trophy: East: Craig Endean, Regina Pats; West: Rob Brown, Kamloops Blazers
WHL Most Sportsmanlike Player: East: Len Nielson, Regina Pats; West: Dave Archibald, Portland Winter Hawks
Top Defenseman - Bill Hunter Trophy: East: Wayne McBean, Medicine Hat Tigers; West: Glen Wesley, Portland Winter Hawks
Rookie of the Year - Jim Piggott Memorial Trophy: East: Joe Sakic, Swift Current Broncos; West: Dennis Holland, Portland Winter Hawks
Top Goaltender - Del Wilson Trophy: East: Kenton Rein, Prince Albert Raiders; West: Dean Cook, Kamloops Blazers
Coach of the Year - Dunc McCallum Memorial Trophy: East: Graham James, Swift Current Broncos; West: Ken Hitchcock, Kamloops Blazers
Regular season champions - Scotty Munro Memorial Trophy: Kamloops Blazers
WHL Plus-Minus Award: Rob Brown, Kamloops Blazers

== All-Star teams ==
East Division
| | First Team | | Second Team | |
|---|---|---|---|---|
| Goal | Kenton Rein | Prince Albert Raiders | Mark Reimer | Saskatoon Blades |
| Defense | Wayne McBean | Medicine Hat Tigers | unknown | |
| Defense | Mark Tinordi | Calgary Wranglers | Dean Kolstad | Prince Albert Raiders |
| Center | Theoren Fleury | Moose Jaw Warriors | Joe Sakic | Swift Current Broncos |
| Left Wing | Mark Pederson | Medicine Hat Tigers | Craig Endean | Regina Pats |
| Right Wing | Pat Elynuik | Prince Albert Raiders | unknown | |
West Division
| | First Team | | Second Team | |
| Goal | Drago Adam | New Westminster Bruins | Peter Fry | Victoria Cougars |
| Defense | Greg Hawgood | Kamloops Blazers | Mike Berger | Spokane Chiefs |
| Defense | Glen Wesley | Portland Winter Hawks | Chris Joseph | Seattle Thunderbirds |
| Center | Rob Brown | Kamloops Blazers | Glen Goodall | Seattle Thunderbirds |
| Left Wing | Brent Hughes | Victoria Cougars | Ken Priestlay | Victoria Cougars |
| Right Wing | Robin Bawa | Kamloops Blazers | Ron Shudra | Kamloops Blazers |

== See also ==
- 1987 NHL entry draft
- 1986 in sports
- 1987 in sports

| Preceded by 1985–86 WHL season | WHL seasons | Succeeded by 1987–88 WHL season |
