= 2006 Memorial Cup =

Canadian junior men's ice hockey championship

2006 Mastercard Memorial Cup

Tournament details
- Venue(s): Moncton Coliseum; Moncton, New Brunswick
- Dates: May 19–28, 2006
- Teams: 4
- Host team: Moncton Wildcats (QMJHL)
- TV partner(s): Rogers Sportsnet

Final positions
- Champions: Quebec Remparts (QMJHL) (2nd title)

Tournament statistics
- Games played: 9
- Attendance: 62,423 (6,936 per game)

The Memorial Cup trophy

The 2006 Memorial Cup was held in Moncton, New Brunswick, from May 19–28. It was the 88th annual Memorial Cup competition and determined the major junior ice hockey champion of the Canadian Hockey League (CHL). The host team Moncton Wildcats were the only team guaranteed a spot in the tournament. The other teams were the champions of the Ontario Hockey League (OHL), the Peterborough Petes; the Western Hockey League (WHL) champions, the Vancouver Giants; and the Quebec Major Junior Hockey League (QMJHL)'s Quebec Remparts, who were runners-up in the QMJHL final to the champion Wildcats. The Remparts won the Memorial Cup, defeating the Wildcats 6–2 in the first all-QMJHL final in tournament history. It also marked the first, and currently only time in Memorial Cup history that the winning team was neither the host nor a league champion.

== Round-robin standings ==
Pos	Team	Pld	W	L	GF	GA	GD
1	Quebec Remparts (QMJHL rep.)	3	2	1	12	9	+3
1	Moncton Wildcats (QMJHL and host)	3	2	1	10	8	+2
3	Vancouver Giants (WHL)	3	1	2	8	11	−3
3	Peterborough Petes (OHL) (Note: Peterborough finished ahead of Vancouver on goal differential, but Vancouver won the tie-breaker game.)	3	1	2	7	9	−2

== Rosters ==
Moncton Wildcats (host and QMJHL Champion)	Peterborough Petes (OHL)
Goaltenders: 35 – Jhase Sniderman; 39 – Josh Tordjman; Defencemen: 2 – Nick Emmanuele; 3 – Keith Yandle; 4 – Andrew MacDonald; 6 – Luc Bourdon; 7 – Oskars Bartulis; 8 – David MacDonald; 27 – Nathan Welton; 77 – Maxime Belanger; Forwards: 9 – Philippe Dupuis; 10 – Adam Pineault; 11 – Jerome Samson; 12 – Christian Gaudet; 15 – Martins Karsums; 16 – Stephane Goulet; 17 – Brad Marchand; 21 – Tim Spencer; 24 – Joshua Hepditch; 28 – Chris Morehouse; 36 – Matt Eagles; 61 – Matt Marquardt; 71 – Jean-Philip Chabot; Head coach: Ted Nolan	Goaltenders: 1 – David Shantz; 30 – Breton MacKinnon; 34 – Trevor Cann; Defencemen: 2 – Aaron Dawson; 3 – Mark Pawlowksi; 4 – Lubomir Stach; 5 – Bryan Young; 7 – Trevor Hendrikx; 18 – Craig Cescon; 26 – Kyle Raftis; 28 – Burke MacDonald; Forwards: 9 – Jordan Morrison; 11 – Jordan Staal; 12 – Scott Cowie; 14 – Justin Soryal; 15 – Steve Lock; 16 – Greg Stewart; 17 – Zach Harnden; 19 – Justin Caruna; 20 – Steve Downie; 21 – Jason McDonough; 22 – Liam Reddox; 23 – Daniel Ryder; 24 – Fredrik Naslund; 25 – Jamie Tardif; 27 – Patrick Kaleta; Head coach: Dick Todd
Quebec Remparts (QMJHL)	Vancouver Giants (WHL)
Goaltenders: 30 – Cedrick Desjardins; 35 – Kevin Desfosses; Defencemen: 2 – Andrew Andricopoulos; 5 – Joey Ryan; 6 – Pierre Bergeron; 8 – Michal Sersen; 24 – Guillaume Veilleux; 27 – Stephen Valente; 44 – Marc-Edouard Vlasic; Forwards: 7 – Angelo Esposito; 9 – Yan Ouimet; 10 – Simon Courcelles; 13 – Todd Chinova; 14 – Kenzie Sheppard; 16 – Jordan LaVallee; 17 – Felix Petit; 18 – Brent Aubin; 19 – Christophe Poirier; 21 – Maxime Lacroix; 22 – Alexander Radulov; 55 – Alexandre Mineault; 58 – Nicolas Robillard; 91 – Mathieu Melanson; Head coach: Patrick Roy	Goaltenders: 1 – Tommy Tartaglione; 29 – Tyson Sexsmith; 37 – Dustin Slade; Defencemen: 2 – Ryan Molle; 3 – Paul Albers; 4 – Brent Regner; 5 – Mark Fistric; 6 – Cody Franson; 7 – Jonathon Blum; 21 – Brett Festerling; 22 – Brendan Mikkelson; 23 – John Flatters; 38 – Nathan Deck; Forwards: 9 – Jason Reese; 10 – David Rutherford; 11 – J. D. Watt; 12 – Tim Kraus; 13 – Kyle Lamb; 14 – Lance Bouma; 15 – Spencer Machacek; 16 – Kenton Dulle; 17 – Gilbert Brule; 18 – Mitch Czibere; 19 – Mitch Bartley; 20 – Mario Bliznak; 24 – Garet Hunt; 26 – Michal Repik; 27 – Milan Lucic; 28 – James Wright; 32 – Chad Scharff; Head coach: Don Hay

== Schedule ==
=== Round robin ===
May 19, 2006	Peterborough	3–2	Québec	Moncton Coliseum

S. Downie 29:21; J. Tardif 49:43; J. Morrison 55:29 / Goals / M. Lacroix 40:51 (SH); J. Ryan 55:16 (PP)

May 20, 2006	Moncton	3–2	Vancouver	Moncton Coliseum

P. Dupuis 32:35 (PP); B. Marchand 35:39; M. Karsums 46:15 / Goals / M. Repik 1:17; M. Bartley 41:39

May 21, 2006	Québec	6–3	Vancouver	Moncton Coliseum

A. Radulov 33:23; M. Melanson 38:58; M. Sersen 40:37 (PP); J. LaVallee 49:38; A. Radulov 52:41 (PP); J. LaVallee 58:58 (EN) / Goals / M. Bartley 00:20; G. Brule 16:14 (SH); P. Albers 35:39

May 22, 2006	Moncton	4–2	Peterborough	Moncton Coliseum

S. Goulet 19:41; S. Goulet 31:16; A. Pineault 34:21; B. Marchand 55:26 / Goals / S. Downie 29:58 (PP); G. Stewart 43:12

May 23, 2006	Vancouver	3–2	Peterborough	Moncton Coliseum

B. Parker 15:07 (PP); G. Brule 24:48; G. Brule 48:42 (SH) / Goals / J. Tardif 28:44 (PP); D. Ryder 50:53

May 24, 2006	Québec	4–3	Moncton	Moncton Coliseum

M. Melanson 19:46; M. Lacroix 23:39; A. Radulov 40:17; A. Andricopoulos 56:13 / Goals / J. Samson 15:42; C. Gaudet 38:47; P. Dupuis 52:49

=== Tie breaker ===
May 25, 2006	Peterborough	0–6	Vancouver	Moncton Coliseum

Goals / C. Franson 16:25 (PP); G. Brule 22:57 (PP); C. Franson 24:15 (PP); C. Franson 26:48 (PP); G. Brule 45:39 (PP); J. Blum 47:36 (PP)

=== Semi-final ===
May 26, 2006	Moncton	3–1	Vancouver	Moncton Coliseum

K. Yandle 4:33 (PP); M. Marquardt 6:18 (PP); C. Gaudet 59:15 (EN) / Goals / G. Brule 11:36 (PP)

=== Championship game ===
May 28, 2006	Québec	6–2	Moncton	Moncton Coliseum

P. Bergeron 9:36; A. Radulov 19:50; A. Radulov 21:51; A. Esposito 31:03; M. Melanson 49:58 (PP); J. LaVallee 59:17 (PP) / Goals / K. Yandle 40:31 (PP); K. Yandle 43:57

== Leading scorers ==
Player	GP	G	A	Pts	+/-	PIM
Gilbert Brule, Vancouver	5	6	6	12	−1	18
Alexander Radulov, Quebec	4	5	4	9	+4	6
Philippe Dupuis, Moncton	5	2	5	7	+3	4
Mathieu Melanson, Quebec	4	3	3	6	+5	8
Cody Franson, Vancouver	5	3	2	5	−5	8
Maxime Lacroix, Quebec	4	2	3	5	+2	2
Angelo Esposito, Quebec	4	1	4	5	+2	6
Jordan LaVallee, Quebec	4	3	1	4	−3	7
Stephane Goulet, Moncton	5	2	2	4	+2	2
Brad Marchand, Moncton	5	2	2	4	+1	2
Mitch Bartley, Vancouver	5	2	2	4	+2	2
Martins Karsums, Moncton	5	1	3	4	+2	6
Paul Albers, Vancouver	5	1	3	4	−4	4

== Leading goaltenders ==
Player	MINS	GA	GAA	SO	Sv%
Josh Tordjman, Moncton	298	11	2.21	0	.935
Dustin Slade, Vancouver	295	12	2.43	1	.886
Cedrick Desjardins, Quebec	239	15	3.76	0	.881
David Shantz, Peterborough	235	15	3.83	0	.906

== Award winners ==
- Stafford Smythe Memorial Trophy (MVP): Alexander Radulov, Quebec
- George Parsons Trophy (Sportsmanship): Jerome Samson, Moncton
- Hap Emms Memorial Trophy (Goaltender): Cedrick Desjardins, Quebec
- Ed Chynoweth Trophy (Leading Scorer): Gilbert Brule, Vancouver

All-star team

- Goal: Cedrick Desjardins, Quebec
- Defence: Paul Albers, Vancouver; Michal Sersen, Quebec
- Forwards: Alexander Radulov, Québec; Gilbert Brule, Vancouver; Adam Pineault, Moncton

== The road to the cup ==
All series are best-of-seven

=== WHL playoffs ===
For regular season final standings and other stats, see 2005–06 WHL season.

Conference Quarter-finals	Conference Semi-finals
C1	Medicine Hat	4
C4	Swift Current	0
C1	Medicine Hat	4
E2	Saskatoon	0
E3	Regina	2
E2	Saskatoon	4
Eastern
C2	Calgary	4
C3	Lethbridge	2
C2	Calgary	3
E1	Moose Jaw	4
E4	Brandon	2
E1	Moose Jaw	4
B1	Vancouver	4
B4	Prince George	1
B1	Vancouver	4
U3	Portland	1
U3	Portland	4
U2	Seattle	3
Western
B2	Kelowna	4
B3	Kootenay	2
B2	Kelowna	2
U1	Everett	4
U4	Tri City	1
U1	Everett	4

Conference Finals
C1	Medicine Hat	1
E1	Moose Jaw	4
B1	Vancouver	4
U1	Everett	0

President's Cup Finals
E1	Moose Jaw	0
B1	Vancouver	4

=== OHL playoffs ===
For regular season final standings and other stats, see 2005–06 OHL season.

Conference Quarter-finals	Conference Semi-finals
1	Peterborough	4
8	Ottawa	2
1	Peterborough	4
5	Sudbury	0
4	Kingston	2
5	Sudbury	4
East
2	Brampton	4
7	Belleville	2
2	Brampton	1
3	Barrie	4
3	Barrie	4
6	Toronto	0
1	London	4
8	Sault Ste. Marie	0
1	London	4
6	Owen Sound	2
3	Kitchener	1
6	Owen Sound	4
West
4	Guelph	4
5	Saginaw	0
4	Guelph	4
2	Plymouth	2
2	Plymouth	4
7	Windsor	3

Conference Finals
1	Peterborough	4
3	Barrie	1
1	London	4
4	Guelph	1

J. Ross Robertson Cup Finals
E1	Peterborough	4
W1	London	0

=== QMJHL playoffs ===
For regular season final standings and other stats, see 2005–06 QMJHL season.

Division Quarterfinals	Division Semifinals
1	Moncton	4
8	Victoriaville	1
1	Moncton	4
4	Halifax	1
4	Lewiston	2
5	Halifax	4
East
2	Acadie–Bathurst	4
7	P.E.I.	2
2	Acadie-Bathurst	4
3	Cape Breton	0
3	Cape Breton	4
6	St. John's	1
1	Québec	4
8	Val-d'Or	1
1	Québec	4
6	Shawinigan	1
3	Rouyn-Noranda	1
6	Shawinigan	4
West
2	Chicoutimi	4
7	Baie-Comeau	0
2	Chicoutimi	1
4	Gatineau	4
4	Gatineau	4
5	Drummondville	3

League Semi-Finals
1	Moncton	4
4	Gatineau	1
1	Québec	4
2	Acadie-Bathurst	3

President's Cup Finals
E1	Moncton	4
W1	Québec	2

Note: teams cross over between conferences for the final four.
