= Paul Albers =

Canadian ice hockey player

- Born: October 15, 1985 (age 40) Melville, Saskatchewan, Canada
- Height: 6 ft 1 in (185 cm)
- Weight: 188 lb (85 kg; 13 st 6 lb)
- Position: Defence
- Shot: Left
- Played for: Houston Aeros; Thomas Sabo Ice Tigers; Krefeld Pinguine; Tohoku Free Blades; SG Cortina
- NHL draft: Undrafted
- Playing career: 2006–2015

Paul Albers (born October 15, 1985) is a Canadian former professional ice hockey defenceman who played in the American Hockey League (AHL) with the Houston Aeros.

== Playing career ==
Albers played major junior in the Western Hockey League (WHL) for five seasons with the Calgary Hitmen, Regina Pats, and Vancouver Giants. As an overaged player with the Giants in 2005–06, Albers recorded a major junior career high 17 goals, 45 assists, and 62 points. He was named to the WHL West First All-Star Team, along with teammate Dustin Slade, and earned a nomination for the Bill Hunter Memorial Trophy as the league's top defenceman (awarded to Kris Russell of the Medicine Hat Tigers). His +39 plus/minus was a league high and earned him the WHL Plus-Minus Award. Albers added 19 points in 18 postseason games, helping lead the Giants to a President's Cup as WHL champions. Playing in the subsequent 2006 Memorial Cup in Moncton, he was named to the Tournament All-Star Team with teammate Gilbert Brulé.

Undrafted by a National Hockey League (NHL) club, Albers signed an entry-level contract with the Minnesota Wild and turned pro in the ECHL with the Texas Wildcatters in 2006–07. He recorded 43 points as a rookie and moved up to the American Hockey League (AHL) with the Houston Aeros the next season. On July 31, 2009, he left the United States and signed for German club Nürnberg Ice Tigers.

Albers spent six seasons of his professional career abroad, the last three with SG Cortina in the Italian Serie A before retiring after the 2014–15 season.

== Career statistics ==
			Regular season					Playoffs
Season	Team	League	GP	G	A	Pts	PIM	GP	G	A	Pts	PIM
2001–02	Calgary Hitmen	WHL	54	1	5	6	32	7	0	0	0	6
2002–03	Calgary Hitmen	WHL	72	4	20	24	51	5	0	0	0	0
2003–04	Calgary Hitmen	WHL	8	0	1	1	6	—	—	—	—	—
2003–04	Regina Pats	WHL	54	5	18	23	30	4	0	0	0	2
2004–05	Regina Pats	WHL	23	0	4	4	6	—	—	—	—	—
2004–05	Vancouver Giants	WHL	48	4	19	23	42	6	2	3	5	0
2005–06	Vancouver Giants	WHL	70	17	45	62	33	18	3	16	19	8
2006–07	Texas Wildcatters	ECHL	68	12	31	43	32	9	1	5	6	8
2006–07	Houston Aeros	AHL	5	0	0	0	2	—	—	—	—	—
2007–08	Houston Aeros	AHL	69	5	16	21	26	4	0	0	0	0
2008–09	Houston Aeros	AHL	73	4	7	11	52	12	0	1	1	2
2009–10	Thomas Sabo Ice Tigers	DEL	49	3	10	13	24	5	0	0	0	4
2010–11	Krefeld Pinguine	DEL	46	0	12	12	50	8	0	2	2	6
2011–12	Tohoku Free Blades	AL	36	10	21	31	54	—	—	—	—	—
2012–13	SG Cortina	ITL	43	7	18	25	10	12	5	3	8	2
2013–14	SG Cortina	ITL	42	7	22	29	4	10	0	4	4	4
2014–15	SG Cortina	ITL	40	7	30	37	24	—	—	—	—	—
AHL totals			147	9	23	32	80	16	0	1	1	2

== Awards ==
- Named to the WHL West First All-Star Team in 2006
- Won the WHL Plus-Minus Award in 2006
- Won a President's Cup as WHL champions with the Vancouver Giants in 2006
- Named to the Memorial Cup All-Star Team in 2006
