= 2005–06 WHL season =

Junior ice hockey season

- WHL 40th anniversary logo
- League: Western Hockey League
- Sport: Ice hockey
- Duration: Regular season September, 2005 – March, 2006; Playoffs; March – May, 2006
- Teams: 20
- TV partner: Shaw TV

Regular season
- Scotty Munro Memorial Trophy: Medicine Hat Tigers (2)
- Season MVP: Justin Pogge (Calgary Hitmen)
- Top scorer: Troy Brouwer (Moose Jaw Warriors)

Playoffs
- Playoffs MVP: Gilbert Brule (Giants)
- Finals champions: Vancouver Giants (1)
- Runners-up: Moose Jaw Warriors

WHL seasons
- 2004–05 2006–07

2005–06 CHL season
- League: Canadian Hockey League
- Sport: Ice hockey
- Duration: September 2005 – May 2006
- Teams: 58

OHL

QMJHL

WHL

Memorial Cup
- Finals champions: Quebec Remparts (QMJHL) (2nd title)
- Runners-up: Moncton Wildcats (QMJHL)

The 2005–06 WHL season was the 40th season for the Western Hockey League. Twenty teams completed a 72-game schedule. The Vancouver Giants won their first President's Cup, defeating the Moose Jaw Warriors in the championship series and earning a berth in the 2006 Memorial Cup tournament. The Medicine Hat Tigers won the Scotty Munro Memorial Trophy for the best regular season record for the first time since 1985–86.

== League notes ==
Following changes introduced by the National Hockey League following the 2004–05 NHL lockout, the WHL announced that it would adopt many of the new rules put in place by the National Hockey League this season to increase scoring, including:

- Shootouts: Ties no longer possible, with games tied at the end of overtime proceeding to a shootout. Shootout losses count as one point in the standings.
- Tighter standards of officiating, especially as it relates to obstruction fouls.
- Introduction of the goaltender restriction zone, or the "trapezoid". Goaltenders are forbidden from playing the puck in the corners behind the goal line. A violation will merit a two-minute delay of game penalty.
- Tag-up offside rule will be used.
- The centre-ice red line will no longer be considered for the purpose of determining an offside (two-line) pass.
- Any player who shoots the puck over the glass and out of play from their defensive zone will receive a delay of game penalty.
- Any team called for icing the puck from within their defensive zone will not be permitted a line change. Unlike the NHL, any team that ices the puck from their half of the neutral zone will be permitted to change.

The WHL did not immediately modify the goal and blue lines to increase the size of the offensive zones like the NHL, as the league felt that the teams did not have enough time to modify their arenas. Only the Calgary Hitmen, sharing an arena with the NHL's Calgary Flames, played using the new alignment. The new standard was to be employed by the remaining teams beginning in the 2006–07 season.

=== Internet broadcasts ===
On September 14, 2005, Commissioner Ron Robison announced the league's intention to broadcast the entire 2005–06 season and playoffs live online on a pay-per-view basis. Partnering with streaming media company INSINC, this marked the first time in WHL history that fans, media and scouts were able to watch WHL action online.

== Regular season ==
Map of WHL, 2003–04 to 2005–06
East Division
Central Division
BC Division
US Division

=== Final standings ===
==== Eastern Conference ====
East Division
| Pos | Team | Pld | W | L | OTL | SOL | GF | GA | Pts |
|---|---|---|---|---|---|---|---|---|---|
| 1 | x – Moose Jaw Warriors | 72 | 44 | 20 | 5 | 3 | 278 | 205 | 96 |
| 2 | x – Saskatoon Blades | 72 | 41 | 25 | 2 | 4 | 232 | 217 | 88 |
| 3 | x – Regina Pats | 72 | 40 | 27 | 1 | 4 | 236 | 234 | 85 |
| 4 | x – Brandon Wheat Kings | 72 | 30 | 32 | 6 | 4 | 218 | 259 | 70 |
| 5 | Prince Albert Raiders | 72 | 25 | 36 | 1 | 10 | 167 | 228 | 61 |

x – qualified for playoffs

Central Division
| Pos | Team | Pld | W | L | OTL | SOL | GF | GA | Pts |
|---|---|---|---|---|---|---|---|---|---|
| 1 | x – Medicine Hat Tigers | 72 | 47 | 16 | 1 | 8 | 257 | 171 | 103 |
| 2 | x – Calgary Hitmen | 72 | 47 | 18 | 3 | 4 | 195 | 155 | 101 |
| 3 | x – Lethbridge Hurricanes | 72 | 27 | 36 | 3 | 6 | 195 | 250 | 63 |
| 4 | x – Swift Current Broncos | 72 | 24 | 34 | 6 | 8 | 175 | 242 | 62 |
| 5 | Red Deer Rebels | 72 | 26 | 40 | 1 | 5 | 166 | 220 | 58 |

x – qualified for playoffs

==== Western Conference ====
B.C. Division
| Pos | Team | Pld | W | L | OTL | SOL | GF | GA | Pts |
|---|---|---|---|---|---|---|---|---|---|
| 1 | x – Vancouver Giants | 72 | 47 | 19 | 0 | 6 | 252 | 156 | 100 |
| 2 | x – Kelowna Rockets | 72 | 46 | 22 | 1 | 3 | 243 | 188 | 96 |
| 3 | x – Kootenay Ice | 72 | 45 | 23 | 1 | 3 | 233 | 177 | 94 |
| 4 | x – Prince George Cougars | 72 | 35 | 31 | 2 | 4 | 195 | 195 | 76 |
| 5 | Kamloops Blazers | 72 | 34 | 33 | 2 | 3 | 179 | 196 | 73 |

x – qualified for playoffs

U.S. Division
| Pos | Team | Pld | W | L | OTL | SOL | GF | GA | Pts |
|---|---|---|---|---|---|---|---|---|---|
| 1 | x – Everett Silvertips | 72 | 40 | 27 | 2 | 3 | 203 | 158 | 85 |
| 2 | x – Seattle Thunderbirds | 72 | 35 | 31 | 1 | 5 | 186 | 211 | 76 |
| 3 | x – Portland Winter Hawks | 72 | 32 | 32 | 3 | 5 | 204 | 258 | 72 |
| 4 | x – Tri-City Americans | 72 | 30 | 35 | 4 | 3 | 188 | 221 | 67 |
| 5 | Spokane Chiefs | 72 | 25 | 39 | 5 | 3 | 193 | 254 | 58 |

x – qualified for playoffs

=== Scoring leaders ===
Note: GP = Games played; G = Goals; A = Assists; Pts = Points; PIM = Penalties in minutes

| Player | Team | GP | G | A | Pts | PIM |
|---|---|---|---|---|---|---|
| Troy Brouwer | Moose Jaw Warriors | 72 | 49 | 53 | 102 | 122 |
| Adam Cracknell | Kootenay Ice | 72 | 42 | 51 | 93 | 85 |
| Ian McDonald | Tri-City Americans | 71 | 37 | 55 | 92 | 16 |
| Dustin Boyd | Moose Jaw Warriors | 64 | 48 | 42 | 90 | 34 |
| Justin Keller | Kelowna Rockets | 72 | 51 | 37 | 88 | 82 |
| Blair Jones | Moose Jaw Warriors | 72 | 35 | 50 | 85 | 85 |
| Devin Setoguchi | Saskatoon Blades | 65 | 36 | 47 | 83 | 69 |
| Darren Helm | Medicine Hat Tigers | 70 | 41 | 38 | 79 | 37 |
| Ryan Russell | Kootenay Ice | 72 | 33 | 42 | 75 | 30 |
| Chad Klassen | Spokane/Saskatoon | 68 | 27 | 48 | 75 | 61 |

=== Goaltending leaders ===
Note: GP = Games played; Min = Minutes played; W = Wins; L = Losses; SOL = Shootout losses; GA = Goals against; SO = Total shutouts; SV% = Save percentage; GAA = Goals against average

| Player | Team | GP | Min | W | L | SOL | GA | SO | SV% | GAA |
|---|---|---|---|---|---|---|---|---|---|---|
| Justin Pogge | Calgary Hitmen | 54 | 3237 | 38 | 12 | 4 | 93 | 11 | .926 | 1.72 |
| Dustin Slade | Vancouver Giants | 55 | 3319 | 36 | 13 | 5 | 105 | 11 | .912 | 1.90 |
| Leland Irving | Everett Silvertips | 67 | 3791 | 37 | 23 | 3 | 121 | 4 | .925 | 1.91 |
| Matt Keetley | Medicine Hat Tigers | 62 | 3741 | 42 | 14 | 5 | 130 | 6 | .916 | 2.09 |
| Taylor Dakers | Kootenay Ice | 47 | 2671 | 30 | 15 | 1 | 94 | 8 | .926 | 2.11 |

== 2006 WHL Playoffs ==
=== Overview ===
Conference Quarter-finals | Conference Semi-finals
C1 | Medicine Hat | 4
C4 | Swift Current | 0
C1 | Medicine Hat | 4
E2 | Saskatoon | 0
E3 | Regina | 2
E2 | Saskatoon | 4
Eastern
C2 | Calgary | 4
C3 | Lethbridge | 2
C2 | Calgary | 3
E1 | Moose Jaw | 4
E4 | Brandon | 2
E1 | Moose Jaw | 4
B1 | Vancouver | 4
B4 | Prince George | 1
B1 | Vancouver | 4
U3 | Portland | 1
U3 | Portland | 4
U2 | Seattle | 3
Western
B2 | Kelowna | 4
B3 | Kootenay | 2
B2 | Kelowna | 2
U1 | Everett | 4
U4 | Tri-City | 1
U1 | Everett | 4

Conference Finals
C1 | Medicine Hat | 1
E1 | Moose Jaw | 4
B1 | Vancouver | 4
U1 | Everett | 0

WHL Championship
E1 | Moose Jaw | 0
B1 | Vancouver | 4

=== Conference quarterfinals ===
==== Eastern Conference ====
Moose Jaw vs. Brandon
| Date | Away | Home |
|---|---|---|
| March 24 | Brandon 1 | 5 Moose Jaw |
| March 25 | Brandon 2 | 1 Moose Jaw |
| March 27 | Moose Jaw 2 | 3 Brandon |
| March 30 | Moose Jaw 4 | 1 Brandon |
| April 2 | Brandon 0 | 1 Moose Jaw |
| April 4 | Moose Jaw 5 | 0 Brandon |
Moose Jaw wins 4–2

Medicine Hat vs. Swift Current
| Date | Away | Home | |
|---|---|---|---|
| March 24 | Swift Current 2 | 5 Medicine Hat | |
| March 25 | Swift Current 1 | 7 Medicine Hat | |
| March 28 | Medicine Hat 7 | 1 Swift Current | |
| March 29 | Medicine Hat 3 | 2 Swift Current | OT |
Medicine Hat wins 4–0

Saskatoon vs. Regina
| Date | Away | Home | |
|---|---|---|---|
| March 24 | Regina 2 | 3 Saskatoon | OT |
| March 25 | Regina 1 | 4 Saskatoon | |
| March 28 | Saskatoon 4 | 5 Regina | OT |
| March 29 | Saskatoon 5 | 3 Regina | |
| March 31 | Regina 5 | 2 Saskatoon | |
| April 4 | Saskatoon 5 | 1 Regina | |
Saskatoon wins 4–2

Calgary vs. Lethbridge
| Date | Away | Home | |
|---|---|---|---|
| March 24 | Calgary 3 | 2 Lethbridge | |
| March 25 | Calgary 2 | 5 Lethbridge | |
| March 28 | Lethbridge 6 | 4 Calgary | |
| March 30 | Lethbridge 1 | 2 Calgary | |
| April 1 | Lethbridge 2 | 3 Calgary | OT |
| April 2 | Calgary 3 | 2 Lethbridge | OT |
Calgary wins 4–2

==== Western Conference ====
Vancouver vs. Prince George
| Date | Away | Home | |
|---|---|---|---|
| March 24 | Prince George 0 | 3 Vancouver | |
| March 25 | Prince George 2 | 0 Vancouver | |
| March 28 | Vancouver 6 | 0 Prince George | |
| March 29 | Vancouver 3 | 2 Prince George | OT |
| April 1 | Prince George 2 | 5 Vancouver | |
Vancouver wins 4–1

Everett vs. Tri-City
| Date | Away | Home | |
|---|---|---|---|
| March 24 | Tri-City 0 | 4 Everett | |
| March 25 | Tri-City 2 | 1 Everett | |
| March 28 | Everett 2 | 1 Tri-City | OT |
| March 29 | Everett 4 | 1 Tri-City | |
| March 31 | Tri-City 0 | 2 Everett | |
Everett wins 4–1

Kelowna vs. Kootenay
| Date | Away | Home | |
|---|---|---|---|
| March 24 | Kootenay 3 | 2 Kelowna | 2OT |
| March 25 | Kootenay 1 | 5 Kelowna | |
| March 28 | Kelowna 3 | 4 Kootenay | |
| March 29 | Kelowna 5 | 4 Kootenay | |
| March 31 | Kootenay 1 | 4 Kelowna | |
| April 2 | Kelowna 5 | 2 Kootenay | |
Kelowna wins 4–2

Seattle vs Portland
| Date | Away | Home | |
|---|---|---|---|
| March 24 | Portland 5 | 8 Seattle | |
| March 25 | Portland 1 | 0 Seattle | |
| March 28 | Seattle 1 | 2 Portland | |
| March 31 | Seattle 6 | 3 Portland | |
| April 1 | Portland 3 | 2 Seattle | |
| April 4 | Seattle 5 | 2 Portland | |
| April 5 | Portland 4 | 3 Seattle | OT |
Portland wins 4–3

=== Conference semifinals ===
Eastern Conference

Medicine Hat vs. Saskatoon
| Date | Away | Home | |
|---|---|---|---|
| April 7 | Saskatoon 1 | 5 Medicine Hat | |
| April 8 | Saskatoon 3 | 4 Medicine Hat | 3OT |
| April 11 | Medicine Hat 3 | 2 Saskatoon | OT |
| April 12 | Medicine Hat 3 | 1 Saskatoon | |
Medicine Hat wins 4–0

Calgary vs. Moose Jaw
| Date | Away | Home | |
|---|---|---|---|
| April 8 | Moose Jaw 0 | 3 Calgary | |
| April 9 | Moose Jaw 3 | 2 Calgary | OT |
| April 11 | Calgary 2 | 4 Moose Jaw | |
| April 12 | Calgary 2 | 0 Moose Jaw | |
| April 14 | Moose Jaw 3 | 4 Calgary | OT |
| April 16 | Calgary 1 | 3 Moose Jaw | |
| April 19 | Moose Jaw 3 | 1 Calgary | |
Moose Jaw wins 4–3

Western Conference

Kelowna vs. Everett
| Date | Away | Home | |
|---|---|---|---|
| April 7 | Everett 5 | 3 Kelowna | |
| April 9 | Everett 2 | 3 Kelowna | |
| April 11 | Kelowna 0 | 2 Everett | |
| April 12 | Kelowna 2 | 3 Everett | |
| April 14 | Everett 2 | 3 Kelowna | 2OT |
| April 16 | Kelowna 2 | 6 Everett | |
Everett wins 4–2

Vancouver vs. Portland
| Date | Away | Home | |
|---|---|---|---|
| April 7 | Portland 1 | 0 Vancouver | |
| April 8 | Portland 1 | 7 Vancouver | |
| April 12 | Vancouver 4 | 3 Portland | OT |
| April 13 | Vancouver 3 | 1 Portland | |
| April 16 | Portland 0 | 2 Vancouver | |
Vancouver wins 4–1

=== Conference finals ===
Eastern Conference

Medicine Hat vs. Moose Jaw
| Date | Away | Home | |
|---|---|---|---|
| April 21 | Moose Jaw 3 | 2 Medicine Hat | |
| April 22 | Moose Jaw 4 | 3 Medicine Hat | OT |
| April 25 | Medicine Hat 5 | 3 Moose Jaw | |
| April 26 | Medicine Hat 1 | 3 Moose Jaw | |
| April 28 | Moose Jaw 4 | 3 Medicine Hat | OT |
Moose Jaw wins 4–1

Western Conference

Vancouver vs. Everett
| Date | Away | Home |
|---|---|---|
| April 21 | Everett 2 | 4 Vancouver |
| April 22 | Everett 0 | 2 Vancouver |
| April 25 | Vancouver 5 | 0 Everett |
| April 27 | Vancouver 5 | 0 Everett |
Vancouver wins 4–0

=== WHL Championship ===
Vancouver vs. Moose Jaw
| Date | Away | Home |
|---|---|---|
| May 5 | Moose Jaw 1 | 5 Vancouver |
| May 6 | Moose Jaw 5 | 7 Vancouver |
| May 8 | Vancouver 2 | 1 Moose Jaw |
| May 9 | Vancouver 6 | 3 Moose Jaw |
Vancouver wins 4–0

== ADT Canada-Russia Challenge ==
On November 30, Team WHL defeated the Russian Selects 9–2 in Saskatoon, Saskatchewan before a crowd of 5,572.

On December 1, Team WHL defeated the Russian Selects 3–1 in Regina, Saskatchewan before a crowd of 4,662.

== WHL awards ==
Four Broncos Memorial Trophy (Player of the Year): Justin Pogge, Calgary Hitmen
Daryl K. (Doc) Seaman Trophy (Scholastic Player of the Year): Brennen Wray, Moose Jaw Warriors
Scholastic Team of the Year: Kootenay Ice
Bob Clarke Trophy (Top scorer): Troy Brouwer, Moose Jaw Warriors
Brad Hornung Trophy (Most Sportsmanlike Player): Kris Russell, Medicine Hat Tigers
Bill Hunter Trophy (Top Defenseman): Kris Russell, Medicine Hat Tigers
Jim Piggott Memorial Trophy (Rookie of the Year): Peter Mueller, Everett Silvertips
Del Wilson Trophy (Top Goaltender): Justin Pogge, Calgary Hitmen
Dunc McCallum Memorial Trophy (Coach of the Year): Willie Desjardins, Medicine Hat Tigers
Lloyd Saunders Memorial Trophy (Executive of the Year): Scott Bonner, Vancouver Giants
Scotty Munro Memorial Trophy (Best regular season record): Medicine Hat Tigers
Allen Paradice Memorial Trophy (Top Official): Kyle Rehman
St. Clair Group Trophy (Marketing/Public Relations Award): Dave Andjelic, Medicine Hat Tigers
Doug Wickenheiser Memorial Trophy (Humanitarian of the Year): Wacey Rabbit, Saskatoon Blades
WHL Plus-Minus Award: Paul Albers, Vancouver Giants
WHL Playoff Most Valuable Player: Gilbert Brule, Vancouver Giants

== All-Star teams ==
Eastern Conference
| | First Team | | Second Team | |
|---|---|---|---|---|
| Goal | Justin Pogge | Calgary Hitmen | Matt Keetley | Medicine Hat Tigers |
| Defense | Kris Russell | Medicine Hat Tigers | Kyle Deck | Regina Pats |
| Defense | Brett Carson | Calgary Hitmen | Jeff Schultz | Calgary Hitmen |
| Forward | Dustin Boyd | Moose Jaw Warriors | Kyle Chipchura | Prince Albert Raiders |
| Forward | Troy Brouwer | Moose Jaw Warriors | Blair Jones | Moose Jaw Warriors |
| Forward | Darren Helm | Medicine Hat Tigers | Devin Setoguchi | Saskatoon Blades |
Western Conference
| | First Team | | Second Team | |
| Goal | Dustin Slade | Vancouver Giants | Leland Irving | Everett Silvertips |
| Defense | Paul Albers | Vancouver Giants | Cody Franson | Vancouver Giants |
| Defense | Shaun Heshka | Everett Silvertips | Logan Stephenson | Tri-City Americans |
| Forward | Blake Comeau | Kelowna Rockets | Gilbert Brule | Vancouver Giants |
| Forward | Justin Keller | Kelowna Rockets | Adam Cracknell | Kootenay Ice |
| Forward | Ian McDonald | Tri-City Americans | Brandon Dubinsky | Portland Winter Hawks |

- source: Western Hockey League press release

== 2006 Bantam draft ==
The 2006 WHL Bantam Draft took place in Calgary on Thursday, May 4. It was the 17th annual draft to take place.

List of first round picks in the bantam draft.

| # | Player | Nationality | WHL Team |
|---|---|---|---|
| 1 | Jared Cowen (D) | Canada | Spokane Chiefs |
| 2 | Landon Ferraro (C) | Canada | Red Deer Rebels |
| 3 | Ryan Howse (LW) | Canada | Chilliwack Bruins |
| 4 | Cole Penner (LW) | Canada | Prince Albert Raiders |
| 5 | Jimmy Bubnick (C) | Canada | Kamloops Blazers |
| 6 | Cody Eakin (C) | Canada | Swift Current Broncos |
| 7 | Carter Ashton (LW) | Canada | Lethbridge Hurricanes |
| 8 | Jason Gardiner (C/LW) | Canada | Tri-City Americans |
| 9 | Brayden Schenn (C) | Canada | Brandon Wheat Kings |
| 10 | Riley Boychuk (LW) | Canada | Portland Winter Hawks |
| 11 | Steve Chaffin (D) | Canada | Seattle Thunderbirds |
| 12 | Stefan Elliott (D) | Canada | Prince George Cougars |
| 13 | Kellan Tochkin (RW) | Canada | Everett Silvertips |
| 14 | Brett Miller (RW) | Canada | Regina Pats |
| 15 | Mitch Berg (D) | Canada | Saskatoon Blades |
| 16 | Nathan Lieuwen (G) | Canada | Kootenay Ice |
| 17 | Justin Maylan (RW) | Canada | Moose Jaw Warriors |
| 18 | Tyson Barrie (D) | Canada | Kelowna Rockets |
| 19 | Evander Kane (LW) | Canada | Vancouver Giants |
| 20 | Chase Schaber (LW) | Canada | Calgary Hitmen |
| 21 | Cody Carlson (D) | Canada | Medicine Hat Tigers |

== See also ==
- 2005–06 OHL season
- 2005–06 QMJHL season
- 2006 NHL entry draft
- 2005 in ice hockey
- 2006 in ice hockey

| Preceded by 2004–05 WHL season | WHL seasons | Succeeded by 2006–07 WHL season |
