= Jordan Smotherman =

American ice hockey player (born 1986)

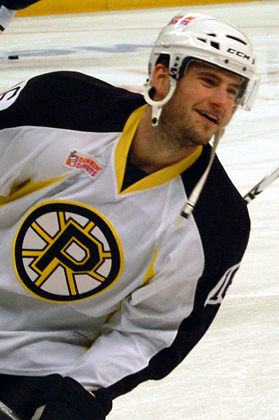
- Born: May 11, 1986 (age 40) Corvallis, Oregon, U.S.
- Height: 6 ft 3 in (191 cm)
- Weight: 211 lb (96 kg; 15 st 1 lb)
- Position: Left wing
- Shot: Left
- Played for: Atlanta Thrashers; EfB Esbjerg; Lahti Pelicans; Rögle BK; Iserlohn Roosters; Belfast Giants
- NHL draft: 116th overall, 2005; Atlanta Thrashers
- Playing career: 2006–2022

Jordan LaVallée Smotherman (born May 11, 1986) is an American former professional ice hockey winger and former head coach and General Manager of the Worcester Railers in the ECHL.

== Playing career ==
Smotherman was born in Corvallis, Oregon and moved to Binghamton, New York at the age of 2 before his family settled in Westborough, Massachusetts at the age of 10. Upon joining the Quebec Remparts, he went by the name Jordan LaVallée in order to connect with the Quebec fanbase, as his mother Maureen was French Canadian. He was a member of the 2006 Memorial Cup champion Quebec Remparts, as one of six New England natives who played on the Remparts roster.

He was drafted by the Atlanta Thrashers in the 4th round, 116th overall, of the 2005 NHL entry draft. His first National Hockey League goal was scored in his second game with the Thrashers in a 2-point effort against Craig Anderson of the Florida Panthers on April 1, 2008, in a 3-2 Thrashers loss.

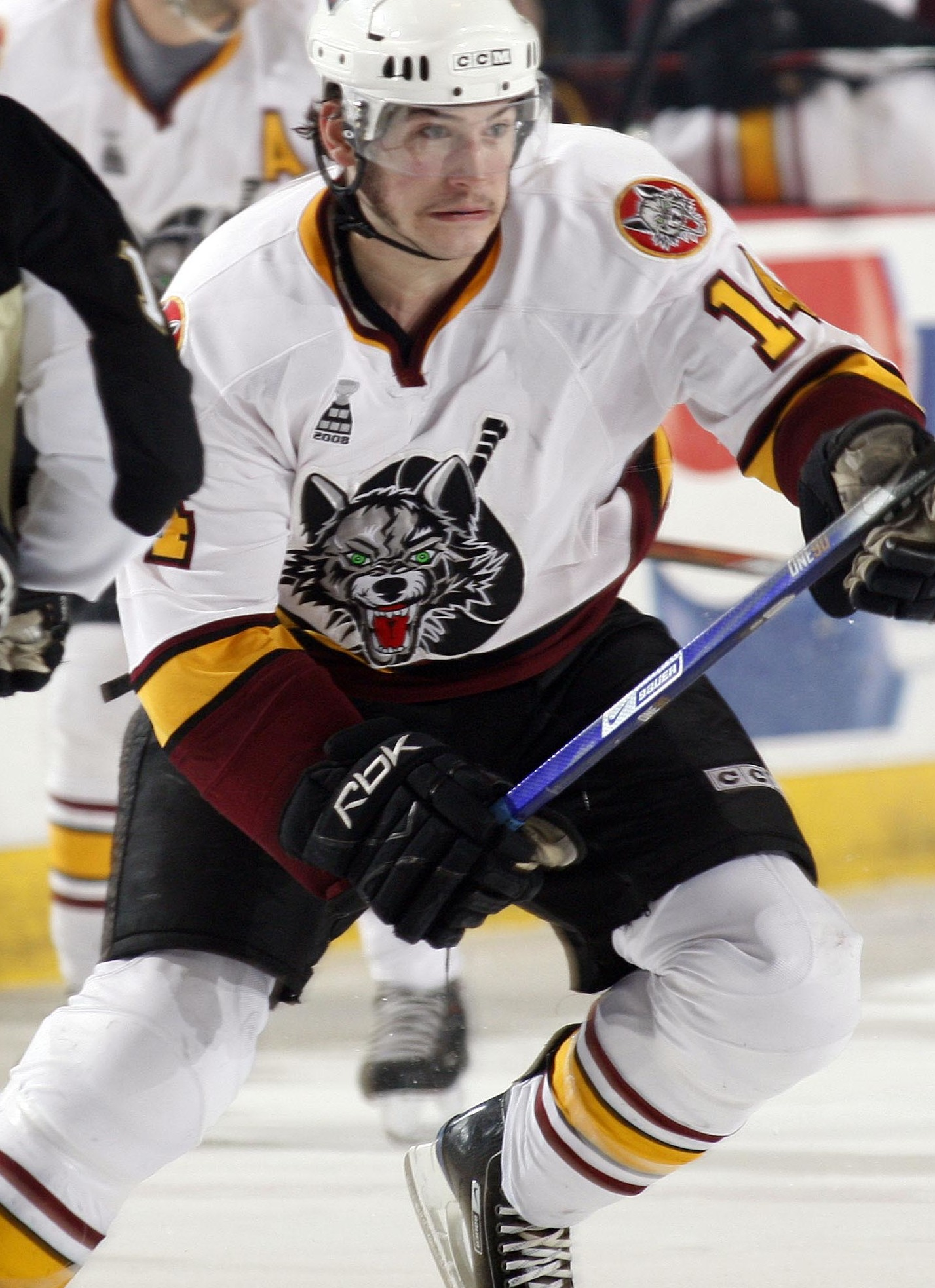
Smotherman playing for the Wolves in the 2008 Calder Cup Final

After spending the majority of his three-year tenure within the Thrashers organization with AHL affiliate, the Chicago Wolves, at the start of the 2009–10 season on October 8, 2009, the Thrashers traded Smotherman to the Columbus Blue Jackets in return for future considerations. He was then assigned to AHL affiliate, the Syracuse Crunch for the entirety of the year posting 10 goals and 32 points in 78 games with the Crunch.

Prior to the 2010–11 season, Smotherman was invited to the Boston Bruins training camp but was released on September 22, 2010, and was reassigned and later signed to the Providence Bruins.

Smotherman joined GET-ligaen club EfB Esbjerg for the 2011–12 season.

For the 2012–13 season, Smotherman joined Tingsryd AIF in the Swedish second-tier league HockeyAllsvenskan. While the team finished second to last in the series and was relegated to Swedish third-tier league Division 1, only one player in the entire league scored more than his 24 goals.

For the 2013–14 season he joined Karlskrona HK of the HockeyAllsvenskan and transferred to fellow Rögle BK during the 2014–15 season. After helping Rögle earn promotion from HockeyAllsvenskan to the Swedish Hockey League (SHL), the highest level professional competition in Sweden, he re-signed with the club and appeared in 52 SHL contests (14 goals, five assists) in 2015–16, helping Rögle to stay in the league.

On June 10, 2016, Smotherman moved to Germany, signing with the Iserlohn Roosters of the country's top-flight Deutsche Eishockey Liga (DEL). In the pre-season with the Roosters, Smotherman and the Roosters opted to terminate his contract, for personal reasons.

Smotherman returned home to North America, and opted to resume his career in the ECHL with the Manchester Monarchs for the 2016–17 season. In contributing with 20 points in 18 games and experiencing a brief stint in the AHL with the Springfield Thunderbirds, Smotherman returned to Sweden in agreeing to a contract with Modo Hockey of the second division Allsvenskan on January 17, 2017. Smotherman played out the season with Modo, collecting 8 goals in 14 games.

As a free agent, Smotherman returned to link up again with the Manchester Monarchs of the ECHL on August 4, 2017. In the 2017–18 season, Smotherman led the Monarchs with 72 points in 69 games earning a place in the ECHL First All-Star Team.

On May 30, 2018, Smotherman signed for a second time with the Iserlohn Roosters of the DEL on a one-year deal.

Smotherman signed for the Belfast Giants of the UK EIHL in February 2019, later going on to score the winning goal in the 2018-19 EIHL Challenge Cup final against the Guildford Flames.

The winger re-signed with Belfast for the 2019–20 season, and took on the role of player-assistant coach to head coach Adam Keefe. Smotherman announced his departure from Belfast in a social media post in July 2020.

On 8 July 2020, it was announced Smotherman would return to the ECHL for the 2020–21 season by signing a contract with the Worcester Railers. However, Worcester did not take part in the 2020–21 ECHL season due to COVID-19.

In January 2021, Smotherman instead moved again to Denmark's Metal Ligaen to sign for Esbjerg Energy - his second spell with the team having played for them during the 2011–12 season.

In July 2021, the Worcester Railers again announced they had agreed terms with Smotherman ahead of the 2021–22 ECHL season. In his final professional year, Smotherman was still able to contribute offensively, posting 30 goals and 52 points through 60 regular season games.

== Coaching career ==
In June 2022, Smotherman moved behind the bench - becoming the Head Coach and General Manager of the ECHL's Worcester Railers.

== Career statistics ==
			Regular season					Playoffs
Season	Team	League	GP	G	A	Pts	PIM	GP	G	A	Pts	PIM
2002–03	Quebec Remparts	QMJHL	55	3	6	9	54	11	0	1	1	0
2003–04	Quebec Remparts	QMJHL	69	11	16	27	111	5	2	0	2	6
2004–05	Quebec Remparts	QMJHL	64	40	26	66	108	13	5	2	7	26
2005–06	Quebec Remparts	QMJHL	37	18	19	37	34	23	7	8	15	30
2006–07	Chicago Wolves	AHL	79	16	18	34	90	14	7	1	8	8
2007–08	Chicago Wolves	AHL	76	20	22	42	73	23	3	5	8	16
2007–08	Atlanta Thrashers	NHL	2	1	1	2	0	—	—	—	—	—
2008–09	Chicago Wolves	AHL	64	18	12	30	94	—	—	—	—	—
2008–09	Atlanta Thrashers	NHL	2	0	0	0	0	—	—	—	—	—
2009–10	Syracuse Crunch	AHL	78	10	22	32	75	—	—	—	—	—
2010–11	Providence Bruins	AHL	71	14	12	26	68	—	—	—	—	—
2011–12	EfB Ishockey	DEN	39	31	29	60	73	5	1	3	4	10
2012–13	Tingsryds AIF	Allsv	52	24	12	36	126	10	2	6	8	18
2013–14	Karlskrona HK	Allsv	47	23	20	43	75	6	4	8	12	6
2014–15	Pelicans	Liiga	38	11	9	20	45	—	—	—	—	—
2014–15	Rögle BK	Allsv	12	10	3	13	16	10	6	3	9	10
2015–16	Rögle BK	SHL	52	14	5	19	16	—	—	—	—	—
2016–17	Manchester Monarchs	ECHL	18	12	8	20	0	—	—	—	—	—
2016–17	Springfield Thunderbirds	AHL	5	0	0	0	2	—	—	—	—	—
2016–17	Modo Hockey	Allsv	14	8	1	9	6	—	—	—	—	—
2017–18	Manchester Monarchs	ECHL	69	34	38	72	51	10	3	2	5	16
2018–19	Iserlohn Roosters	DEL	35	4	11	15	20	—	—	—	—	—
2018–19	Belfast Giants	EIHL	19	6	8	14	4	4	4	2	6	2
2019–20	Belfast Giants	EIHL	47	13	23	36	13	—	—	—	—	—
2020–21	Esbjerg Energy	DEN	12	3	3	6	0	—	—	—	—	—
2021–22	Worcester Railers	ECHL	61	30	22	52	32	—	—	—	—	—
2021–22	Springfield Thunderbirds	AHL	1	1	0	1	0	—	—	—	—	—
AHL totals			374	79	86	165	402	37	10	6	16	24
NHL totals			4	1	1	2	0	—	—	—	—	—
Allsv totals			125	65	36	101	223	26	12	17	29	34
