= Alexander Radulov =

Russian ice hockey player (born 1986)

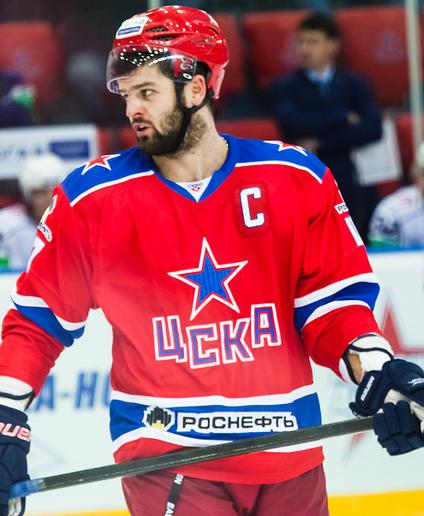
- Radulov with CSKA Moscow in 2012
- Born: 5 July 1986 (age 40) Nizhny Tagil, Russian SFSR, Soviet Union
- Height: 6 ft 1 in (185 cm)
- Weight: 214 lb (97 kg; 15 st 4 lb)
- Position: Right wing
- Shoots: Left
- KHL team Former teams: Lokomotiv Yaroslavl; Dynamo Moscow; Nashville Predators; Salavat Yulaev Ufa; CSKA Moscow; Montreal Canadiens; Dallas Stars; Ak Bars Kazan
- National team: Russia
- NHL draft: 15th overall, 2004; Nashville Predators
- Playing career: 2002–present

Alexander Valerievich Radulov (Russian: Александр Валерьевич Радулов; born 5 July 1986) is a Russian professional ice hockey player for Lokomotiv Yaroslavl of the Kontinental Hockey League (KHL). He had previously had two separate stints with the Nashville Predators, the NHL team which had drafted him, from 2006 to 2008 and again in 2012, as well one season with the Montreal Canadiens, five seasons with the Dallas Stars between 2016 and 2022, and eight seasons in the Kontinental Hockey League (KHL), split evenly between Salavat Yulaev Ufa and CSKA Moscow from 2008 to 2016.

Radulov is a two-time World Champion (2008 and 2009) with Russia; a triple Gagarin Cup champion, in 2011 with Salavat Yulaev Ufa and again in 2025 and 2026 with Lokomotiv Yaroslavl; and a 2006 Memorial Cup champion with the Quebec Major Junior Hockey League (QMJHL)'s Quebec Remparts. He won the Golden Stick Award (KHL MVP) on four occasions. Radulov ranks second in all-time KHL scoring with 427 points, behind Sergei Mozyakin. He is of mixed Russian and Gagauz ethnicity. Alexander is the brother of Igor Radulov.

== Playing career ==
=== Junior career ===
Radulov began his North American career in 2004–05, selected at the 2004 Canadian Hockey League Import player draft by the Quebec Remparts of the Quebec Major Junior Hockey League (QMJHL). That year, he finished third in scoring for his team, with 75 points in 65 games, behind Josh Hennessy and Karl Gagné.

The following year, Radulov became a dominant player in the QMJHL. In the first half of the season, he and Angelo Esposito formed one of the duos in the league. He became equally renowned for skating in front of the opposing team's bench and twirling his stick around and banging the handle on the ice after scoring a goal.

On 28 October 2005, Radulov set a new franchise record with six goals against the Drummondville Voltigeurs. He added an assist in the eventual 11–3 win. That night, Radulov tied the Remparts team's record with Eric Chouinard for most points in a single game, with seven. Later, on 19 March 2006, in a game against the 2005 Memorial Cup second-place finishing Rimouski Océanic, for whom his teammates Cédrick Desjardins and Michal Sersen played for in 2004–05, Radulov wrote history in the Québec Colisée by scoring an unprecedented 7 goals and 4 assists for 11 points, breaking both records for most goals and points in a single game for the Remparts, in a lopsided 16–3 victory.

Radulov owns the Remparts record for the most consecutive point streak games with 50, passing the 28-game mark established by Eric Chouinard in the 1999–2000 season. Radulov is ranked second all-time with that sequence in the QMJHL, only behind Mario Lemieux, with 62.

Radulov finished as the scoring leader for the QMJHL and the CHL in 2005–06 with 152 points (61 goals and 91 assists). He currently owns the record for the most points in a single season for the Remparts, surpassing the mark of 120 set by Simon Gagné in 1998–99. Radulov also owns the record for the most goals and assists in a season as a Rempart. He passed the mark of 57 goals set by Eric Chouinard and the mark of 75 assists set by Wes Scanzano, both in 1999–2000. He also tied with Pavel Rosa for the most points by a QMJHL European player in a single season. His 61 goals were second-highest in the QMJHL for the 2005–06 season; Maxime Boisclair of the Chicoutimi Saguenéens was first, with 70.

In the 2006 QMJHL playoffs, Radulov scored 55 points (21 goals and 34 assists) and was ranked again as the scoring leader. He registered at least a point in each game. Radulov finished only two points shy of the playoff points record set by Simon Gamache in 2000–01. In the Remparts' semi-final series against the Acadie-Bathurst Titan, he had 19 points in the seven-game series alone. He lost the MVP award, however, to victorious Moncton Wildcats forward Mārtiņš Karsums.

All team records set by Radulov are for the new edition of the Remparts, which began in the 1997–98 season.

Radulov delivered an incredible performance in the Remparts' 2006 Memorial Cup championship game victory over the Moncton Wildcats. In the 6–2 win, he netted two goals and assisted on three more, totaling five points, one point away from tying the all-time record in a Memorial Cup final. He registered nine points (five goals and four assists) in four games and won the Stafford Smythe Memorial Trophy as the tournament MVP.

On 28 November 2007, the Remparts retired Radulov's number 22 jersey.

=== Nashville Predators ===
During Radulov's 2005–06 season in the QMJHL, he signed a three-year, entry-level professional contract with the Nashville Predators on 9 January 2006. He would begin his professional career as a member of the Predators' minor league affiliate, the Milwaukee Admirals of the American Hockey League (AHL), the following season. He was selected Player of the Week on 16 October 2006, posting two goals and four assists in only two games.

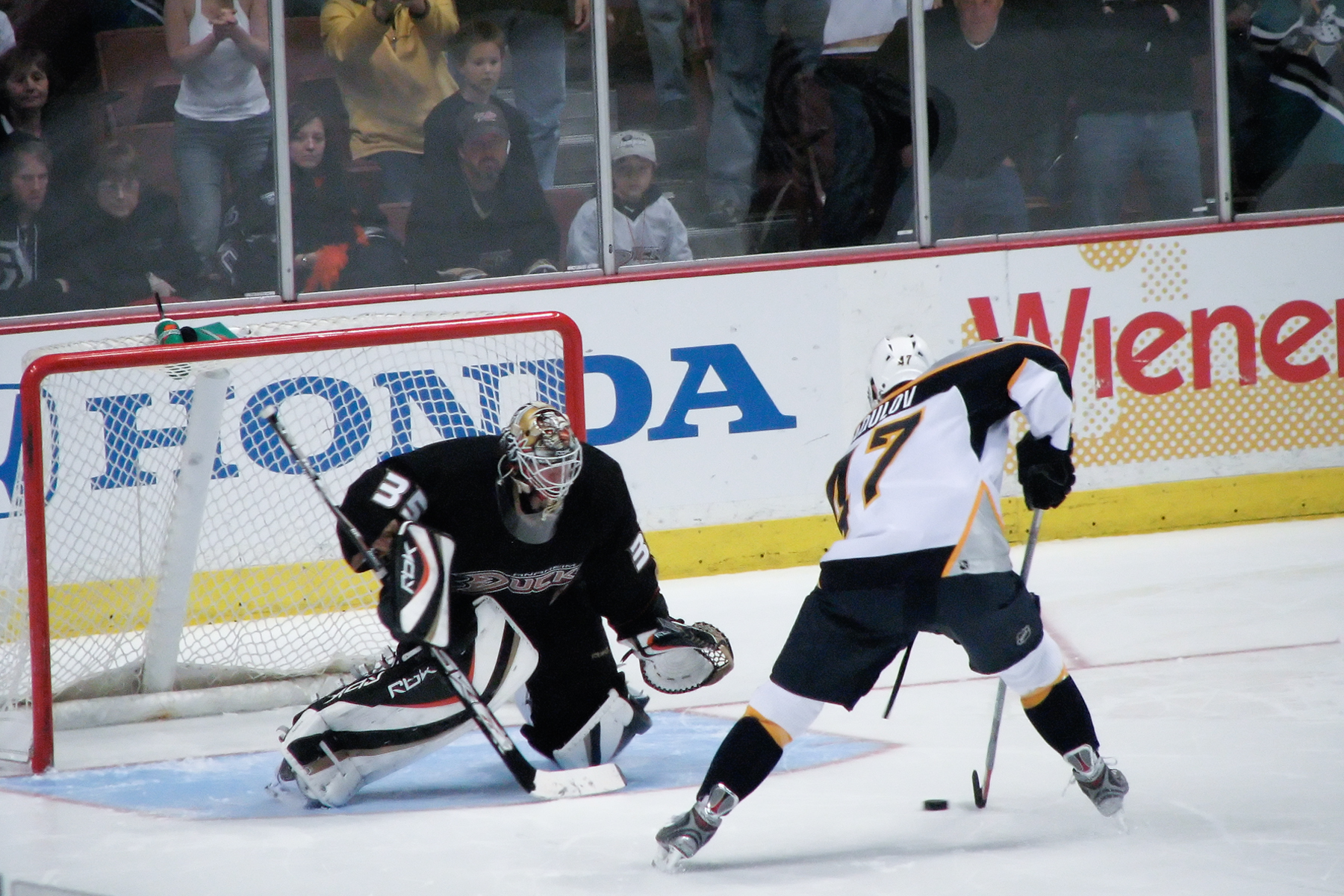
Radulov attempts to score during a shootout in March 2007

On 21 October 2006, Radulov made his NHL debut with the Predators against the Vancouver Canucks, logging seven minutes and one minor penalty. He scored his first career NHL goal on his first career shot against the San Jose Sharks on 26 October. Following another reassignment to Milwaukee, Radulov remained on the Nashville roster for the rest of the 2006–07 season after he was recalled on 21 November 2006.

In Game 2 of the first round of the 2007 Stanley Cup playoffs, Radulov was suspended for one game for his hit on San Jose forward Steve Bernier. Bernier was sent into the boards head first and lay motionless on the ice for three minutes, before being helped off by teammates Joe Thornton and Marcel Goc. Bernier, however, did not suffer any serious injury.

=== Salavat Yulaev Ufa ===
==== Transfer dispute ====
On 11 July 2008, it was announced that although Radulov was still under contract with the Nashville Predators for one more season, he had signed a three-year contract with Salavat Yulaev Ufa of the Kontinental Hockey League (KHL), which would be extended to four years. Radulov had previously notified the Predators organization of his desire to play in Russia, stating that he was being offered better conditions.

Immediately after the announcement, the Predators, NHL and the International Ice Hockey Federation (IIHF) all released statements emphasizing that Radulov's contract obligated him to play for the Predators through the 2008–09 season and that signing with a team in Russia was a direct violation of an agreement made the previous day between the NHL and all international hockey leagues to respect players' existing contracts. After the IIHF ordered that Ufa void Radulov's contract, Ilya Kochevrin, vice-president of the KHL, argued that Radulov was signed on 5 July, before the agreement was made on 10 July. While the contract remained disputed, the IIHF suspended Radulov from international play on 18 July as investigations continued, although the suspension was soon lifted.

Nashville management gave Radulov until 1 September to confirm his intention to remain with the team. They suspended him on 2 September without pay for the 2008–09 season.

==== Two Continental Cups ====
In his first year, the 2008–09 season with Salavat Yulaev Ufa, a 22-year-old Radulov would finish third on the team with 48 points in 52 games. The team would win the Continental Cup as regular season champions. In the playoffs, they would bow out in the first round, with Radulov earning two assists in four games.

In his second year, the 2009–10 season, Radulov would lead his team with 63 points in 54 games. The team would win a second straight Continental Cup, but in the playoffs, they would lose in the Eastern Conference Final to eventual champions Ak Bars Kazan in six games. Radulov led the team with 19 points in 16 games.

Radulov won his first Golden Stick Award as KHL regular season MVP, and made the season All-Star team. His 63 points placed him fourth in the league, three points away from league leader Sergei Mozyakin, who had played two more games. Radulov's plus-minus rating of +44 was second best in the league, behind teammate Patrick Thoresen's +45. Radulov finished the season tied second in assists (39) and tied for ninth in goals (24).

==== Gagarin Cup champion ====
In his third year, the 2010–11 season, Radulov would lead his team and all of the KHL with 80 points in 54 games. Salavat Yulaev Ufa would finish second in the league, with division rival Avangard Omsk winning the Continental Cup. In the playoffs, the pairing of Radulov and Thoresen would lead the team to a Gagarin Cup, with each of them scoring 18 points apiece over 21 games; each scored 3 goals and added 15 assists.

Radulov won his second Golden Stick Award as KHL regular season MVP and made the All-Star team again. His record-setting 80 points were 14 more than linemate Thoresen's 66 points and 19 more than Roman Červenka's 61 points for Avangard Omsk. Radulov finished the season first in assists, tied for 15th in goals, and tied for first in plus-minus rating (+27).

==== Final year ====
At the conclusion of the previous championship winning season, the contract of head coach Vyacheslav Bykov was expiring. At the time, Bykov also served as the head coach of the Russian national team, having held the post for the previous five years. Unfortunately, a poor showing for Russia at the 2011 IIHF World Championship, where the team finished without a medal for the first time under his tenure, prompted Salavat not to renew his contract with the club.

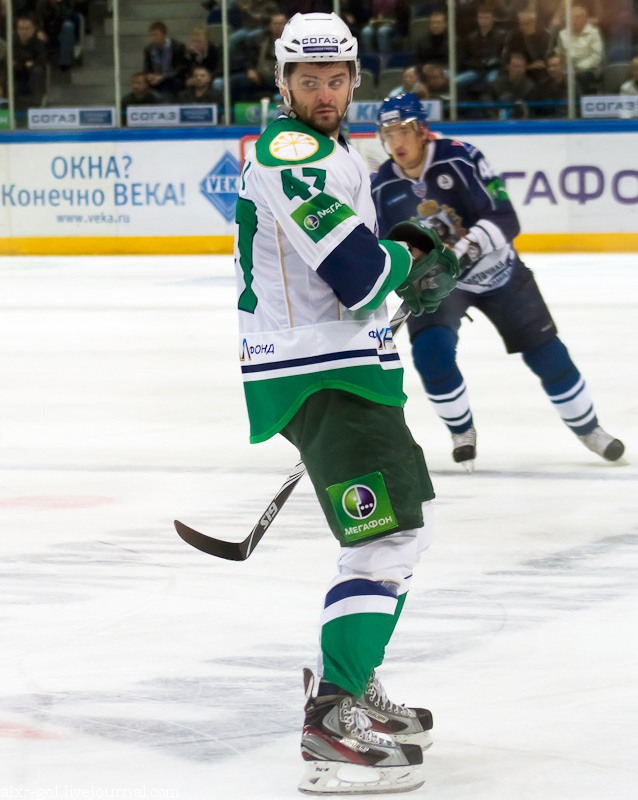
Radulov with Salavat Yulaev Ufa in September 2011, during his final season with the club

As a result, a number of important players left the club in the off season—Patrick Thoresen, Kirill Koltsov and Dmitri Kalinin all signed with mega club SKA Saint Petersburg. This led to the rehiring of head coach Sergei Mikhalev, who had coached the team in the 2008–09 season to a Continental Cup, with a record of 43–8–0–5. However, he was unable to replicate past results and was fired as head coach after 21 games, posting a result of 9–8–0–4.

This led to a third coach within the calendar year being named to the post: Vener Safin. As the team was struggling, more players were traded away, including Robert Nilsson and Jakub Klepiš, among others. The team would round out the season with a record of 21–10–0–2 and ultimately finish eighth in the league. In the playoffs, they would lose to Ak Bars Kazan in the first round, in six games.

In his final year, the 2011–12 season, Radulov would once again lead his team and all of the KHL, with 63 points in 50 games despite an overturned roster. In the playoffs, he would add six assists in six games. At season's end, Radulov won his third Golden Stick Award as KHL regular season MVP and made the All-Star team for the third time. He finished the season first in assists and tied for second in goals.

=== Return to Nashville ===
Following the end of Salavat Yulaev Ufa's 2011–12 season, on 12 March 2012, it was reported that paperwork was being finalized for Radulov to return to Nashville for the balance of the regular season and for the 2012 playoffs. Five days later, Radulov's agent Yuri Nikolaev confirmed Radulov was indeed returning to the NHL for Nashville's 22 March 2012, game against the Pittsburgh Penguins. The day before his return, Radulov was presented his jersey at a press conference, where the Predators announced they had lifted his suspension from the team, finalizing his return. In his return to Nashville, Radulov scored the Predators' only goal in a 5–1 loss to the Penguins. He concluded the 2011–12 regular season with seven points (three goals and four assists) in nine games.

On 1 May 2012, Radulov and Predators teammate Andrei Kostitsyn were spotted at a Scottsdale, Arizona, bar at 5:00 AM the night before Game 2 of their second round playoff series against the Phoenix Coyotes, thus breaking team curfew. Both were subsequently suspended by Predators management for Game 3. Predators general manager David Poile said of the incident, "What they did was unacceptable and the coaches and myself had to come to the plate and do the right thing for the team. It happened. It's really unfortunate. It's selfish behaviour and we'll just have to leave it at that."

On 6 June 2012, the Predators announced that they would not be extending Radulov's contract, thus making him an unrestricted free agent.

=== CSKA Moscow ===
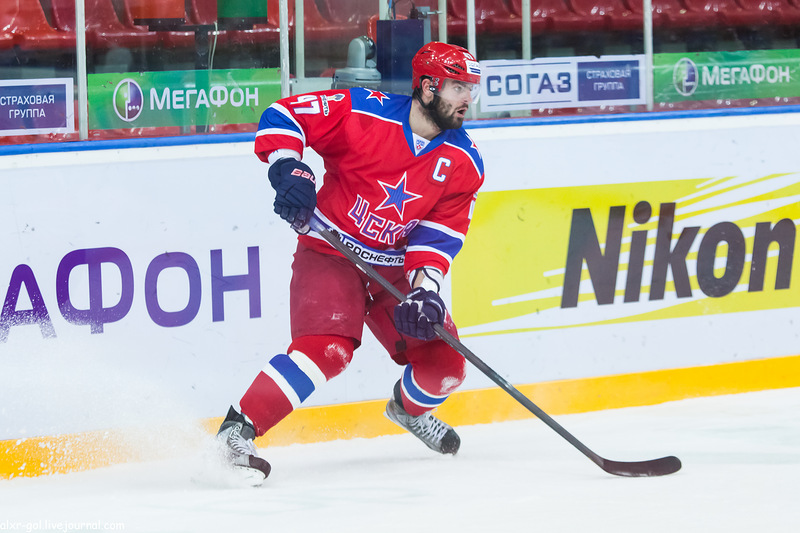
Radulov with CSKA Moscow, November 2012

On 2 July 2012, Radulov signed a four-year contract with CSKA Moscow of the KHL worth an average annual value of $9.2 million. He would lead the KHL in points or finish runner up, in three of the four seasons of his contract: 2012–13 (second), 2014–15 (first) and 2015–16 (second).

The 2013–14 season would be filled with injuries, and Radulov would miss multiple stretches of games. He would go on to appear in only 34 games, while still putting up 34 points. He would also miss the playoffs, during which CSKA was eliminated in the first round. Radulov competed for CSKA at the 2013 Spengler Cup.

In his third year, 2014–15, Radulov led his team to a Continental Cup. In the playoffs, CSKA reached the Conference Final of the Gagarin Cup, losing in Game 7 to the eventual champions SKA Saint Petersburg.

In his fourth and final season, 2015–16, Radulov led CSKA to a second-straight Continental Cup. In the playoffs, they once again met SKA Saint Petersburg in the Conference Final, eliminating them in four-straight games. However, CSKA would then fall short of their ultimate goal and lose Game 7 of the Gagarin Cup Final to champions Metallurg Magnitogorsk.

=== Montreal Canadiens ===
On 1 July 2016, Radulov returned to the NHL as a free agent, signing a one-year, $5.75 million contract with the Montreal Canadiens. Radulov assumed a scoring role on the top line of the Canadiens and went on to score 18 goals and 36 assists for 54 points in 76 games played.

=== Dallas Stars ===
On 3 July 2017, having been unable to agree to another contract with the Canadiens, Radulov signed with the Dallas Stars to a five-year, $31.25 million contract. With the Stars, Radulov reached the 2020 Stanley Cup Finals losing to the Tampa Bay Lightning (2–4). However, the following seasons were plagued with an injury and a decrease of his point production, posting only 22 points in 71 games in the last year of his contract.

=== Ak Bars Kazan ===
On 31 May 2022, his agent announced his return to KHL, signing a two-year contract with Ak Bars Kazan. It was later announced officially by Ak Bars on 14 July.

== International play ==
Medal record

Representing Russia

Ice hockey

World Championships
Gold medal – first place	2009 Switzerland	
Gold medal – first place	2008 Canada	
Bronze medal – third place	2007 Russia	

World Junior Championships
Silver medal – second place	2006 Canada	
Silver medal – second place	2005 United States	

Radulov has played for Russia since the junior youth level, earning silver medals in the 2005 and 2006 World Junior Championships. He made his full senior men's debut in the 2007 World Championships, claiming a bronze medal before capturing two golds at the 2008 and 2009 World Championships.

At the 2014 Winter Olympics in Sochi, Radulov led Russia in goals (three) and points (six) in five games, though the team lost in the quarter-finals to Finland, ultimately finishing in fifth place.

== Personal life ==
In May 2015, Radulov married rhythmic gymnast Darya Dmitriyeva. Their first child was born in November 2015. The pair divorced on 7 June 2017.

== Career statistics ==
=== Regular season and playoffs ===
			Regular season					Playoffs
Season	Team	League	GP	G	A	Pts	PIM	GP	G	A	Pts	PIM
2002–03	Dynamo–2 Moscow	RUS-3	8	3	0	3	8	—	—	—	—	—
2003–04	THC Tver	RUS-2	42	15	16	31	102	—	—	—	—	—
2003–04	Dynamo Moscow	RSL	1	0	0	0	2	—	—	—	—	—
2003–04	Dynamo–2 Moscow	RUS-3	8	4	1	5	45	—	—	—	—	—
2004–05	Quebec Remparts	QMJHL	65	32	43	75	64	13	6	5	11	15
2005–06	Quebec Remparts	QMJHL	62	61	91	152	101	23	21	34	55	30
2006–07	Milwaukee Admirals	AHL	11	6	12	18	26	—	—	—	—	—
2006–07	Nashville Predators	NHL	64	18	19	37	26	4	3	1	4	19
2007–08	Nashville Predators	NHL	81	26	32	58	44	6	2	2	4	6
2008–09	Salavat Yulaev Ufa	KHL	52	22	26	48	92	4	0	2	2	4
2009–10	Salavat Yulaev Ufa	KHL	54	24	39	63	62	16	8	11	19	10
2010–11	Salavat Yulaev Ufa	KHL	54	20	60	80	83	21	3	15	18	42
2011–12	Salavat Yulaev Ufa	KHL	50	25	38	63	64	6	0	6	6	2
2011–12	Nashville Predators	NHL	9	3	4	7	4	8	1	5	6	4
2012–13	CSKA Moscow	KHL	48	22	46	68	86	9	1	6	7	0
2013–14	CSKA Moscow	KHL	34	9	25	34	75	—	—	—	—	—
2014–15	CSKA Moscow	KHL	46	24	47	71	143	16	8	13	21	20
2015–16	CSKA Moscow	KHL	53	23	42	65	73	20	4	12	16	26
2016–17	Montreal Canadiens	NHL	76	18	36	54	62	6	2	5	7	6
2017–18	Dallas Stars	NHL	82	27	45	72	72	—	—	—	—	—
2018–19	Dallas Stars	NHL	70	29	43	72	54	13	5	5	10	8
2019–20	Dallas Stars	NHL	60	15	19	34	46	27	8	10	18	24
2020–21	Dallas Stars	NHL	11	4	8	12	6	—	—	—	—	—
2021–22	Dallas Stars	NHL	71	4	18	22	30	3	0	0	0	0
2022–23	Ak Bars Kazan	KHL	62	25	32	57	66	24	10	9	19	49
2023–24	Ak Bars Kazan	KHL	58	16	24	40	36	4	1	3	4	29
2024–25	Lokomotiv Yaroslavl	KHL	60	18	16	34	42	21	7	9	16	4
2025–26	Lokomotiv Yaroslavl	KHL	64	21	31	52	64	22	6	11	17	32
KHL totals			635	249	426	675	886	163	48	97	145	218
NHL totals			524	144	224	368	344	67	21	28	49	67

=== International ===
Year	Team	Event	GP	G	A	Pts	PIM
2003	Russia	U18	5	2	0	2	6
2004	Russia	WJC18	6	2	5	7	2
2005	Russia	WJC	6	2	1	3	4
2006	Russia	WJC	6	1	3	4	4
2007	Russia	WC	9	2	0	2	6
2008	Russia	WC	6	0	3	3	2
2009	Russia	WC	9	4	6	10	10
2010	Russia	OLY	4	1	1	2	4
2011	Russia	WC	9	2	5	7	6
2013	Russia	WC	8	5	5	10	4
2014	Russia	OLY	5	3	3	6	4
Junior totals			23	7	9	16	16
Senior totals			50	17	23	40	36

== Awards and achievements ==
=== KHL ===
Trophies

- Gagarin Cup champion: 2011, 2025, 2026
- Continental Cup winner: 2009, 2010, 2015, 2016
- Golden Stick Award: 2010, 2011, 2012, 2015

=== AHL ===
Player of the week

- Week 2: 10 October 2006 to 15 October 2006

=== CHL ===
Player of the week

- Week 1: 1 November 2005
- Week 21: 21 March 2006

Trophies

- Memorial Cup: 2006
- Stafford Smythe Memorial Trophy: 2006
- CHL Top Scorer Award: 2006
- CHL Player of the Year: 2006

=== QMJHL ===
Player of the week

- Week 6: 24 to 30 October 2005
- Week 18: 23 to 29 January 2006
- Week 23: 27 February to 5 March 2006
- Week 25: 14 to 19 March 2006

Player of the month

- February 2006
- March 2006

Trophies

- Jean Béliveau Trophy: 2006
- Telus Trophy: 2006
- Michel Brière Memorial Trophy: 2006
- QMJHL First All-Star Team: 2006
- Coupe Postes Canada for QMJHL: 2006

Awards and achievements
Preceded by Ryan Suter	Nashville Predators first-round draft pick 2004	Succeeded by Ryan Parent
Preceded by Sidney Crosby	CHL Player of the Year; 2006	Succeeded by John Tavares
