= Josh Tordjman =

Canadian ice hockey goaltender (born 1985)

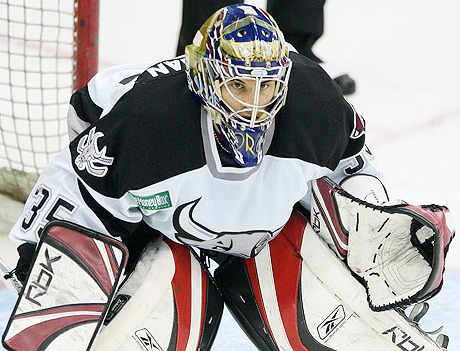
- Tordjman with the San Antonio Rampage in 2006
- Born: January 11, 1985 (age 40); Montreal, Quebec, Canada
- Height: 6 ft 1 in (185 cm)
- Weight: 155 lb (70 kg; 11 st 1 lb)
- Position: Goaltender
- Caught: Left
- Played for: Asiago; EC Salzburg; Phoenix Coyotes
- NHL draft: Undrafted
- Playing career: 2006–2013

Joshua Tordjman (born January 11, 1985) is a Canadian former professional ice hockey goaltender. He played two games in the National Hockey League with the Phoenix Coyotes during the 2008–09 season. The rest of his career, which lasted from 2006 to 2013, was spent in the minor league and concluded with two seasons in Europe.

== Biography ==
Tordjman, who is Jewish, was born in Montreal, Quebec. His parents came from Morocco. As a youth, he played in the 1998 Quebec International Pee-Wee Hockey Tournament with a minor ice hockey team from the Lakeshore area of Montreal.

In 2009, Tordjman was selected to represent Canada in the World Jewish Hockey Championship in Metulla, Israel.

Playing for the Phoenix Coyotes, Tordjman recorded 23 saves in his first NHL game, a 3–2 loss to the New York Islanders on March 8, 2008. Tordjman won the Yanick Dupre Memorial Award in the 2009-10 AHL season, playing for the San Antonio Rampage.

On June 14, 2011, Tordjman signed a one-year contract with European team, EC Red Bull Salzburg, of the Austrian Hockey League. He played one season for Salzburg before joining Asiago Hockey 1935 in the Italian league for an additional season, retiring in 2013.

== Career statistics ==
=== Regular season and playoffs ===
| | | | Regular season | | | | | | | | | | Playoffs |
| Season | Team | League | GP | W | L | T | OTL | MIN | GA | SO | GAA | SV% | GP | W | L | MIN | GA | SO | GAA | SV% |
|---|---|---|---|---|---|---|---|---|---|---|---|---|---|---|---|---|---|---|---|---|
| 2000–01 | Lac St-Louis Lions | QMAAA | 12 | — | — | — | — | — | — | — | 5.07 | .856 | — | — | — | — | — | — | — | — |
| 2001–02 | Lac St-Louis Lions | QMAAA | 30 | — | — | — | — | — | — | — | 4.25 | .872 | — | — | — | — | — | — | — | — |
| 2002–03 | Victoriaville Tigres | QMJHL | 10 | 4 | 3 | 0 | — | 432 | 24 | 1 | 3.33 | .860 | 2 | 0 | 1 | 112 | 12 | 0 | 6.46 | .800 |
| 2003–04 | Victoriaville Tigres | QMJHL | 42 | 10 | 24 | 4 | — | 2177 | 143 | 2 | 3.94 | .893 | — | — | — | — | — | — | — | — |
| 2004–05 | Victoriaville Tigres | QMJHL | 56 | 22 | 28 | 4 | — | 3185 | 171 | 5 | 3.22 | .906 | 7 | 3 | 4 | 435 | 24 | 0 | 3.31 | .929 |
| 2005–06 | Victoriaville Tigres | QMJHL | 31 | 13 | 17 | 0 | — | 1792 | 106 | 2 | 3.55 | .904 | — | — | — | — | — | — | — | — |
| 2005–06 | Moncton Wildcats | QMJHL | 25 | 18 | 6 | 0 | — | 1427 | 55 | 2 | 2.31 | .915 | 21 | 15 | 5 | 1238 | 48 | 2 | 2.33 | .913 |
| 2005–06 | Moncton Wildcats | M-Cup | — | — | — | — | — | — | — | — | — | — | 5 | 3 | 2 | 290 | 15 | 0 | 3.11 | .897 |
| 2006–07 | San Antonio Rampage | AHL | 37 | 15 | 18 | — | 2 | 2114 | 91 | 1 | 2.58 | .920 | — | — | — | — | — | — | — | — |
| 2006–07 | Phoenix RoadRunners | ECHL | 9 | 4 | 4 | — | 0 | 480 | 25 | 0 | 3.12 | .900 | — | — | — | — | — | — | — | — |
| 2007–08 | San Antonio Rampage | AHL | 43 | 22 | 14 | — | 4 | 2466 | 109 | 1 | 2.65 | .910 | 6 | 3 | 3 | 357 | 11 | 1 | 1.85 | .941 |
| 2008–09 | Phoenix Coyotes | NHL | 2 | 0 | 2 | — | 0 | 118 | 8 | 0 | 4.08 | .871 | — | — | — | — | — | — | — | — |
| 2008–09 | San Antonio Rampage | AHL | 51 | 25 | 22 | — | 2 | 2921 | 127 | 6 | 2.61 | .910 | — | — | — | — | — | — | — | — |
| 2009–10 | San Antonio Rampage | AHL | 45 | 20 | 22 | — | 2 | 2537 | 125 | 1 | 2.96 | .902 | — | — | — | — | — | — | — | — |
| 2010–11 | Bakersfield Condors | ECHL | 35 | 16 | 16 | — | 3 | 2033 | 97 | 3 | 2.86 | .913 | — | — | — | — | — | — | — | — |
| 2010–11 | Houston Aeros | AHL | 8 | 4 | 1 | — | 0 | 393 | 16 | 0 | 2.44 | .911 | 1 | 0 | 0 | 26 | 3 | 0 | 6.82 | .833 |
| 2011–12 | EC Salzburg | EBEL | 34 | 18 | 11 | — | 0 | 1841 | 90 | 0 | 2.93 | .912 | — | — | — | — | — | — | — | — |
| 2012–13 | Asiago | ITA | 16 | 8 | 7 | — | 0 | 915 | 43 | 1 | 2.82 | .902 | — | — | — | — | — | — | — | — |
| NHL totals | | | 2 | 0 | 2 | — | 2 | 118 | 8 | 0 | 4.08 | .871 | — | — | — | — | — | — | — | — |

== See also ==
- List of select Jewish ice hockey players
