= Adam Pineault =

American ice hockey player (born 1986)

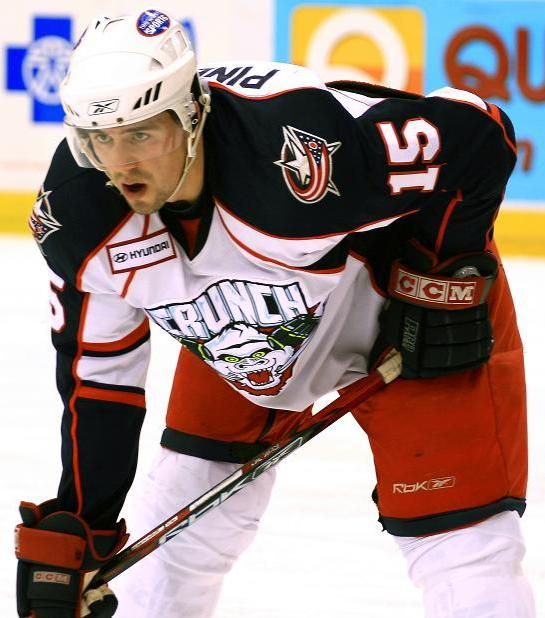
- Pineault with the Syracuse Crunch in 2007
- Born: May 23, 1986 (age 39) Holyoke, Massachusetts, U.S.
- Height: 6 ft 1 in (185 cm)
- Weight: 201 lb (91 kg; 14 st 5 lb)
- Position: Right Wing
- Shot: Right
- Played for: Columbus Blue Jackets; HC Pardubice
- National team: United States
- NHL draft: 46th overall, 2004; Columbus Blue Jackets
- Playing career: 2006–2014

Adam Joseph Pineault (born May 23, 1986) is an American former professional ice hockey forward who played three games for the Columbus Blue Jackets in the National Hockey League (NHL).

== Playing career ==
As a youth, Pineault played in the 1999 and 2000 Quebec International Pee-Wee Hockey Tournaments with the Boston Junior Eagles, and then the Minuteman Flames minor ice hockey teams.

Pineault was drafted 46th overall in the 2004 NHL entry draft by the Columbus Blue Jackets. Pineault originally was a product of the U.S National Development Program. He then played collegiate hockey in 2003–04 with Boston College before moving on to the Moncton Wildcats of the QMJHL.

Pineault made his professional debut in the 2006–07 season with the Blue Jackets affiliate, Syracuse Crunch. Pineault made his NHL debut in the 2007–08 season on April 3, 2008, against the Detroit Red Wings.

On January 10, 2009, Pineault was traded by the Blue Jackets to the Chicago Blackhawks for Michael Blunden. He was then assigned to the Rockford IceHogs of the American Hockey League for the remainder of the 2008–09 season.

Pineault left for Europe and signed during the 2009–10 season to trial with HC in the Czech Extraliga on November 2, 2009. After appearing in ten games with Pardubice, Pineault established himself offensively and was offered a contract to remain on the team on December 8, 2009. Adding a physical presence and scoring 10 goals and 20 points in 31 games as a role player, Pineault was given an extended multi-year contract to stay in the Czech Republic on May 14, 2010.

After resuming his career in North America, with a tenure in the Central Hockey League with the Allen Americans, Pineault signed a one-year contract as a free agent with the Utah Grizzlies of the ECHL on August 28, 2013. At the completion of the 2013–14 season with the Grizzlies, after suffering from a Jaw injury for a significant portion of the year, Pineault opted to end his eight-year professional career and retire.

== Personal ==
Pineault took 2011 away from hockey to be with his wife, Monique Pineault who was battling Leukemia at the time. After his wife went into remission he continued playing hockey for the Allen Americans, but only played in 3 games before returning to be with his wife. Upon retirement, Pinealt opted for a career in pharmaceutical sales, driven by his wife Monique's battle with acute myeloid leukemia.

== Career statistics ==
=== Regular season and playoffs ===
			Regular season					Playoffs
Season	Team	League	GP	G	A	Pts	PIM	GP	G	A	Pts	PIM
2000–01	Boston Junior Bruins	EJHL	57	30	35	65	56	—	—	—	—	—
2001–02	US NTDP U17	USDP	20	5	4	9	14	—	—	—	—	—
2001–02	US NTDP U18	NAHL	38	11	4	15	11	—	—	—	—	—
2002–03	US NTDP U17	USDP	43	13	15	28	76	—	—	—	—	—
2002–03	US NTDP U18	USDP	4	4	3	7	6	—	—	—	—	—
2002–03	US NTDP U18	NAHL	9	5	4	9	13	—	—	—	—	—
2003–04	Boston College	HE	29	4	4	8	30	—	—	—	—	—
2004–05	Moncton Wildcats	QMJHL	61	26	20	46	64	12	2	6	8	18
2005–06	Moncton Wildcats	QMJHL	55	29	30	59	94	21	14	8	22	25
2006–07	Syracuse Crunch	AHL	57	12	16	28	66	—	—	—	—	—
2007–08	Syracuse Crunch	AHL	74	21	27	48	64	8	0	2	2	2
2007–08	Columbus Blue Jackets	NHL	3	0	0	0	0	—	—	—	—	—
2008–09	Syracuse Crunch	AHL	29	5	7	12	36	—	—	—	—	—
2008–09	Rockford IceHogs	AHL	41	5	9	14	16	4	0	0	0	2
2009–10	HC Eaton Pardubice	ELH	31	10	10	20	67	13	0	5	5	12
2010–11	HC Eaton Pardubice	ELH	48	9	5	14	60	7	0	0	0	6
2011–12	Allen Americans	CHL	3	1	1	2	0	—	—	—	—	—
2012–13	Allen Americans	CHL	53	16	23	39	63	1	0	0	0	0
2013–14	Utah Grizzlies	ECHL	28	3	8	11	20	5	0	1	1	0
AHL totals			201	43	59	102	182	12	0	2	2	4
NHL totals			3	0	0	0	0	—	—	—	—	—

=== International ===
Year	Team	Event	Result	GP	G	A	Pts	PIM
2002	United States	U17	1st place, gold medalist(s)	6	1	2	3	4
2003	United States	WJC18	4th	5	0	2	2	4
2005	United States	WJC	4th	7	0	1	1	2
Junior totals				18	1	5	6	10
