= Maxime Lacroix =

Canadian-French ice hockey player

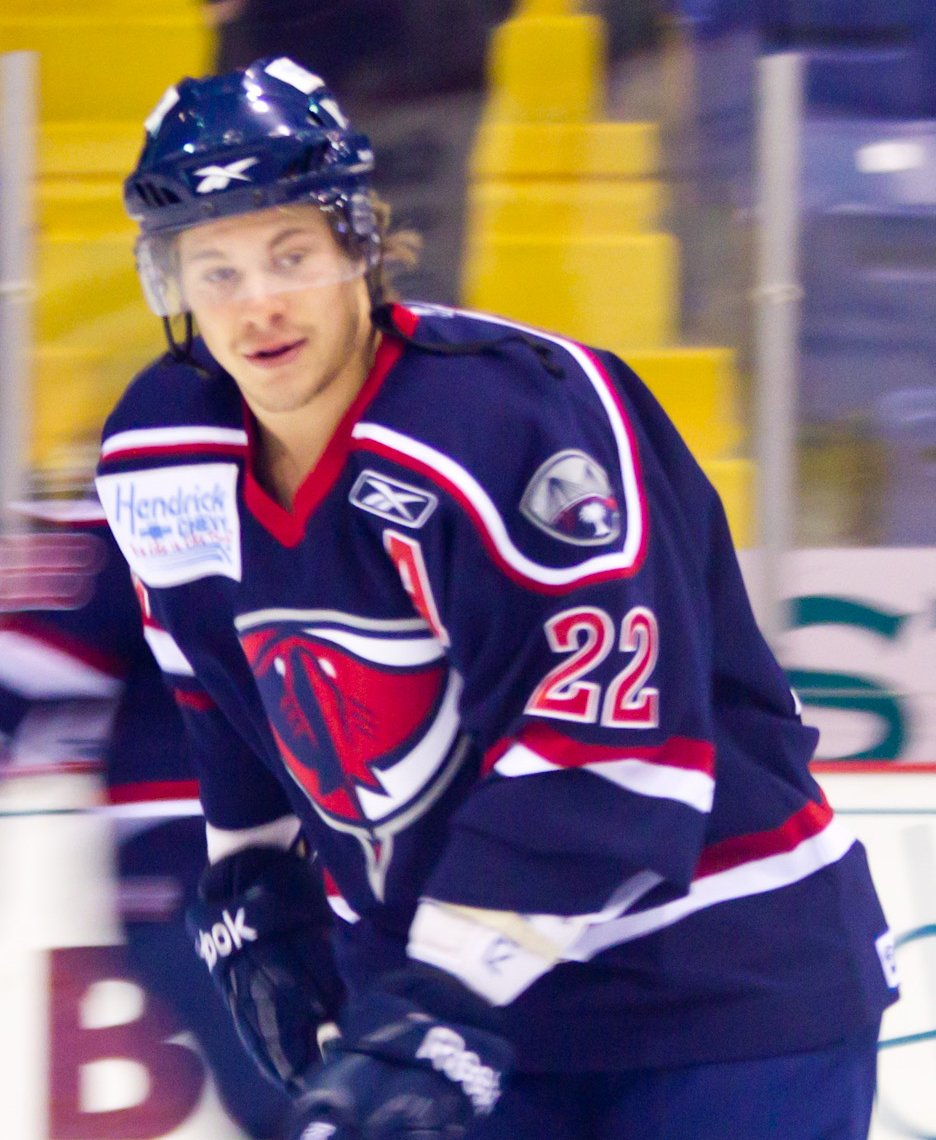
- Born: June 5, 1987 (age 38) Quebec City, Quebec, Canada
- Height: 6 ft 0 in (183 cm)
- Weight: 180 lb (82 kg; 12 st 12 lb)
- Position: Left wing
- Shoots: Left
- LNAH team Former teams: Saint-Georges Cool FM 103.5; Hamilton Bulldogs; Hershey Bears; Odense Bulldogs; Sheffield Steelers; Dragons de Rouen; Ducs d'Angers
- National team: France
- NHL draft: 127th overall, 2006; Washington Capitals
- Playing career: 2007–present

Maxime Lacroix (born June 5, 1987) is a French-Canadian professional ice hockey left winger currently playing for Saint-Georges Cool FM 103.5 in the Ligue Nord-Américaine de Hockey (LNAH). He was drafted by the Washington Capitals in the fifth round of the 2006 NHL entry draft with the 127th pick overall. He is the son of the former NHL player, Pierre Lacroix.

== Playing career ==
Born in Quebec City, Quebec, Lacroix spent his junior career (2004–07) with the Quebec Remparts of the QMJHL. While with the Remparts, he scored 176 points in combined goals and assists and earned 287 penalty minutes in regular season play. In the 2005–06 postseason, Lacroix scored 7 goals and 5 assists, helping the Remparts to their eventual 6–2 victory over the Moncton Wildcats to win the Memorial Cup.

Lacroix turned pro at the end of the 2007–08 season, entering the Washington Capitals organization and joining the Hershey Bears in the Calder Cup playoffs. He scored one goal in the two games leading up to the Bears' first-round elimination by the Wilkes-Barre/Scranton Penguins.

For the 2008–09 season Lacroix joined the ECHL's South Carolina Stingrays in the race for what would become the team's third Kelly Cup championship. He placed second in points during the regular season with the Stingrays, scoring 33 goals and adding 31 assists for 64 points in 63 games, a 1.02 point-per-game average. Lacroix made Kelly Cup finals history when he scored back-to-back goals within 13 seconds of each other to seal a 3–2 comeback win over the Alaska Aces in the first game of the finals. Additionally, he tied the ECHL record for second-highest number of goals in a final series with 6 goals against the Aces.

Lacroix signed with the AHL's Hamilton Bulldogs for the 2009–10 season, posting three points and two penalty minutes in 27 games. Lacroix spent the rest of the season with the Cincinnati Cyclones, scoring 28 points in the regular season and 12 points in the playoffs to lead the Cyclones to their second Kelly cup title in three years, as well as Lacroix's second in two years.

Lacroix returned to the Stingrays to begin the 2010–11 season and would swing between the ECHL and AHL's Hershey Bears until the end of the 2011–12 season.

In the 2012–13 season, he helped the Odense Bulldogs reach the semifinals of Superisligaen in Denmark. He spent the 2013–14 season in England, playing for the Sheffield Steelers of the EIHL. He led the Steelers in scoring (31 games: 18 goals, 18 assists) before twin fractures in his ankle cut his season short.

Lacroix moved to France for the 2014–15 season, joining the Dragons de Rouen. He transferred to fellow Ligue Magnus side Ducs d'Angers for the following campaign.

== International play ==
Lacroix was invited to a training camp of the French Men's National Team in 2007.

== Career statistics ==
=== Regular season and playoffs ===
| | | | Regular season | | | | | Playoffs |
| Season | Team | League | GP | G | A | Pts | PIM | GP | G | A | Pts | PIM |
|---|---|---|---|---|---|---|---|---|---|---|---|---|
| 2003–04 | Séminaire Saint–François | QMAAA | 42 | 21 | 21 | 42 | 72 | — | — | — | — | — |
| 2004–05 | Quebec Remparts | QMJHL | 49 | 6 | 8 | 14 | 34 | 13 | 0 | 0 | 0 | 8 |
| 2005–06 | Quebec Remparts | QMJHL | 70 | 25 | 22 | 47 | 79 | 23 | 7 | 5 | 12 | 21 |
| 2006–07 | Quebec Remparts | QMJHL | 68 | 22 | 31 | 53 | 85 | 5 | 2 | 1 | 3 | 2 |
| 2007–08 | Quebec Remparts | QMJHL | 67 | 30 | 32 | 62 | 89 | 8 | 1 | 5 | 6 | 16 |
| 2007–08 | Hershey Bears | AHL | — | — | — | — | — | 2 | 1 | 0 | 1 | 0 |
| 2008–09 | South Carolina Stingrays | ECHL | 63 | 33 | 31 | 64 | 86 | 23 | 13 | 5 | 18 | 37 |
| 2008–09 | Hershey Bears | AHL | 6 | 1 | 0 | 1 | 7 | — | — | — | — | — |
| 2009–10 | Hamilton Bulldogs | AHL | 27 | 1 | 2 | 3 | 2 | — | — | — | — | — |
| 2009–10 | Cincinnati Cyclones | ECHL | 38 | 17 | 11 | 28 | 51 | 19 | 3 | 9 | 12 | 20 |
| 2010–11 | South Carolina Stingrays | ECHL | 13 | 7 | 3 | 10 | 20 | — | — | — | — | — |
| 2010–11 | Hershey Bears | AHL | 57 | 6 | 10 | 16 | 25 | 6 | 0 | 0 | 0 | 0 |
| 2011–12 | South Carolina Stingrays | ECHL | 31 | 12 | 21 | 33 | 26 | 9 | 5 | 5 | 10 | 6 |
| 2011–12 | Hershey Bears | AHL | 29 | 1 | 2 | 3 | 20 | — | — | — | — | — |
| 2012–13 | Odense Bulldogs | DEN | 40 | 15 | 25 | 40 | 36 | 14 | 5 | 4 | 9 | 4 |
| 2013–14 | Sheffield Steelers | EIHL | 24 | 12 | 17 | 29 | 42 | 4 | 2 | 2 | 4 | 0 |
| 2014–15 | Dragons de Rouen | FRA | 26 | 8 | 20 | 28 | 32 | 4 | 0 | 1 | 1 | 0 |
| 2015–16 | Ducs d'Angers | FRA | 26 | 22 | 25 | 47 | 14 | 16 | 6 | 10 | 16 | 30 |
| 2016–17 | Ducs d'Angers | FRA | 44 | 12 | 19 | 31 | 28 | 6 | 3 | 4 | 7 | 0 |
| 2017–18 | Ducs d'Angers | FRA | 43 | 15 | 18 | 33 | 58 | 5 | 1 | 1 | 2 | 8 |
| 2018–19 | Ducs d'Angers | FRA | 44 | 24 | 20 | 44 | 40 | 5 | 1 | 2 | 3 | 0 |
| 2019–20 | Ducs d'Angers | FRA | 40 | 21 | 23 | 44 | 56 | 4 | 0 | 1 | 1 | 4 |
| 2021–22 | Saint–Georges Cool FM 103.5 | LNAH | 26 | 5 | 11 | 16 | 23 | 11 | 3 | 2 | 5 | 23 |
| 2022–23 | Saint–Georges Cool FM 103.5 | LNAH | 34 | 15 | 29 | 44 | 30 | 17 | 10 | 11 | 21 | 18 |
| AHL totals | | | 119 | 9 | 14 | 23 | 54 | 8 | 1 | 0 | 1 | 0 |
| FRA totals | | | 223 | 102 | 125 | 227 | 228 | 40 | 11 | 19 | 30 | 42 |

=== International ===
| Year | Team | Event | Result | GP | G | A | Pts | PIM |
|---|---|---|---|---|---|---|---|---|
| 2016 | France | OGQ | DNQ | 3 | 0 | 0 | 0 | 0 |
| Senior totals | | | | 3 | 0 | 0 | 0 | 0 |
