= Gilbert Brulé =

Canadian ice hockey player (born 1987)

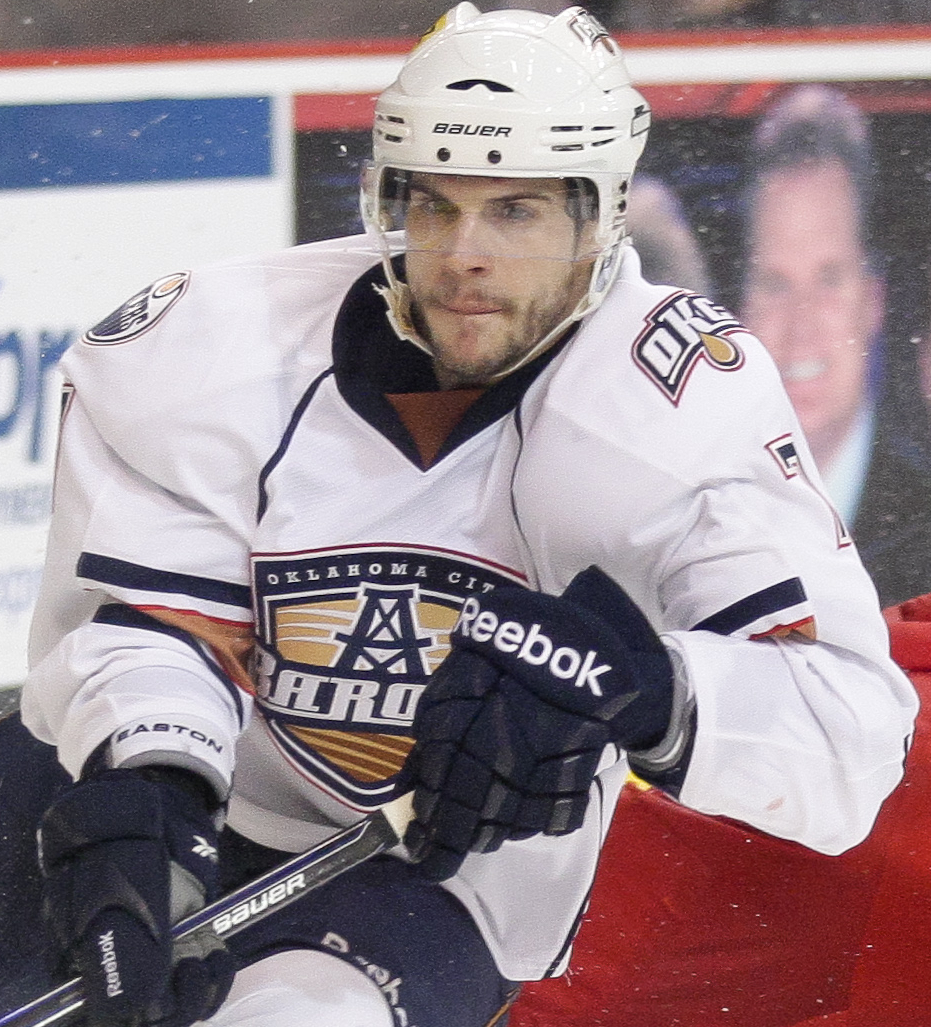
- Brulé with the Oklahoma City Barons in 2011
- Born: January 1, 1987 (age 39) Edmonton, Alberta, Canada
- Height: 5 ft 11 in (180 cm)
- Weight: 186 lb (84 kg; 13 st 4 lb)
- Position: Centre
- Shot: Right
- Played for: Columbus Blue Jackets; Edmonton Oilers; Phoenix Coyotes; ZSC Lions; Avtomobilist Yekaterinburg; KHL Medvescak Zagreb; Neftekhimik Nizhnekamsk; Traktor Chelyabinsk; Kunlun Red Star; Sibir Novosibirsk; TH Unia Oświęcim
- National team: Canada
- NHL draft: 6th overall, 2005; Columbus Blue Jackets
- Playing career: 2005–2021

Gilbert Jean Marco Brulé (born January 1, 1987) is a Canadian former professional ice hockey centre.

Drafted out of the Western Hockey League (WHL), Brulé played major junior with the Vancouver Giants for three seasons. After being named the WHL rookie of the year in 2004, Brulé was selected as the WHL playoff MVP and led the Memorial Cup in scoring, as part of the Giants' WHL championship-winning season two years later. Selected sixth overall in the 2005 NHL entry draft, he began his NHL career with the Columbus Blue Jackets before being traded to the Edmonton Oilers prior to the 2008–09 season. After three seasons with the Oilers, he was placed on waivers, then acquired by the Coyotes for the 2011–12 season and playoffs. He then joined the ZSC Lions for the 2012–13 season. Brulé was released by the Zurich-based team in October 2012.

Internationally, Brulé has represented Team Canada at the 2004 World U-17 Hockey Challenge and 2004 U-18 Junior World Cup, winning silver and gold medals, respectively. He played for Canada's bronze medal-winning team at the 2018 Winter Olympics.

== Playing career ==
As a youth, Brulé played in the 2001 Quebec International Pee-Wee Hockey Tournament with a minor ice hockey team from North Vancouver.

=== Early junior career ===
Brulé was selected first overall in the 2002 WHL Bantam Draft by the Vancouver Giants. The selection was originally possessed by the Prince Albert Raiders, but was dealt to the Giants in exchange for their third overall and third round selections. He debuted in one game with the Giants during the subsequent WHL season, while playing Junior A (Note: Junior A is a competitive level below the major junior level of the Western Hockey League) in the British Columbia Hockey League (BCHL) with the Quesnel Millionaires. Recording 57 points (32 goals and 25 assists) over 48 games in his lone BCHL season, he was named the Interior Conference's recipient of the Bruce Allison Memorial Trophy as rookie of the year.

In 2003–04, Brulé joined the Giants and tallied 60 points in 67 games. He became the first Giants player to win a major WHL award, receiving the Jim Piggott Memorial Trophy as league rookie of the year. The distinction made him a nominee for Canadian Hockey League (CHL) Rookie of the Year, which went to Quebec Major Junior Hockey League (QMJHL) rookie of the year Sidney Crosby of the Rimouski Océanic. He joined Crosby on the CHL All-Rookie Team.

The following season, Brulé finished third in WHL scoring with 87 points (39 goals and 48 assists), establishing a Giants single-season point-scoring record (surpassed by Casey Pierro-Zabotel in 2008–09). During the campaign, he was chosen to a squad of WHL All-Stars against the Russian select team in the 2004 ADT Canada-Russia Challenge in November. Several months later, he competed in the 2005 CHL Top Prospects Game, where he recorded the first hat trick in the history of the all-star match and was named Team Cherry's player of the game. At the end of the season, Brulé was named the CHL Scholastic Player of the Year, having taken more high school credits than any other WHL player.

=== NHL debut and Memorial Cup tournament ===
Brulé was selected sixth overall in the 2005 NHL entry draft by the Columbus Blue Jackets. He remained the highest-drafted Giants player in team history until Evander Kane was selected fourth overall in 2009. Brulé had been the second-ranked prospect behind Crosby by the International Scouting Services (ISS) at the beginning of the 2004–05 season, while the NHL Central Scouting Bureau (CSB) named him the WHL's top prospect in their preliminary rankings. By the end of the season, Brulé was ranked fourth overall by the ISS and fifth among North American skaters by the CSB. At the time of his draft, he was touted as an offensively skilled player with a competitive and physical edge. The ISS scouted him as an "outstanding skater with great vision on the ice...a natural goalscorer."

Brulé made the Blue Jackets' lineup in his first NHL training camp and signed with the club to a three-year, entry-level contract on October 3, 2005. He made his NHL debut against the Washington Capitals in the Blue Jackets' season opener two days later, notching an assist on a goal by Dan Fritsche in a 3–1 loss. The following game, he suffered a fractured sternum after receiving a hit from Calgary Flames defenceman Roman Hamrlík on October 7. After missing 17 games, he returned to the lineup on November 20. Brulé scored his first NHL career goal that night against Phoenix Coyotes, his team's lone tally in a 5–1 loss, beating goaltender David LeNeveu with a shot from the left offensive zone faceoff circle. Ten days later, he suffered his second injury in as many months, breaking his leg during a game against the Minnesota Wild.

Upon recovering, he was returned to the WHL on January 13, 2006. By reassigning Brulé before he played 10 NHL games, the Blue Jackets retained the first year of his rookie contract. Another strong factor in the decision to return him to junior was the acquisition of centre Sergei Fedorov, making Brulé expendable. Returning to the Giants, Brulé scored at a near-goal-a-game pace. He was named WHL Player of the Week on February 20, 2006, after recording 5 goals and 10 points in 3 Giants wins. He was later chosen as WHL Player of the Month for February with 12 goals and 23 points in 13 games. Completing the season with 23 goals and 38 points in 27 games, he earned WHL Second All-Star Team honours. In the opening round of the WHL playoffs, Brulé was named WHL and CHL Player of the Week by scoring four goals and seven points over three games against the Prince George Cougars. He received his second WHL and CHL Player of the Week honour during the WHL Finals against the Moose Jaw Warriors on May 10, having accumulated five goals and nine points in two games. His award-winning week included a three-goal, four-point performance in Game 1 of the series – a 7–5 win for the Giants. He went on to lead the WHL in scoring with 30 points in 18 games to earn the airBC Trophy as playoff MVP, helping the Giants to their first President's Cup as WHL champions.

Advancing to the 2006 Memorial Cup, (Note: Winners of the three leagues that constitute the Canadian Hockey League go on to compete in the Memorial Cup for the national major junior championship; a fourth team participates as tournament hosts.) the Giants tied for third out of four teams after the round-robin. Requiring a tie-breaker game to determine who would play in the semi-final, Brulé recorded five points (two goals, three assists) against the Peterborough Petes, one point short of the tournament single-game record, in a 6–0 win. The Giants were subsequently eliminated in the semi-final by the Moncton Wildcats 3–1. Brulé registered the only Giants goal in the game. Finishing with 12 points in 5 games, Brulé earned the Ed Chynoweth Trophy as the national tournament's leading scorer. He was also named to the Memorial Cup All-Star Team, alongside Giants teammate Paul Albers.

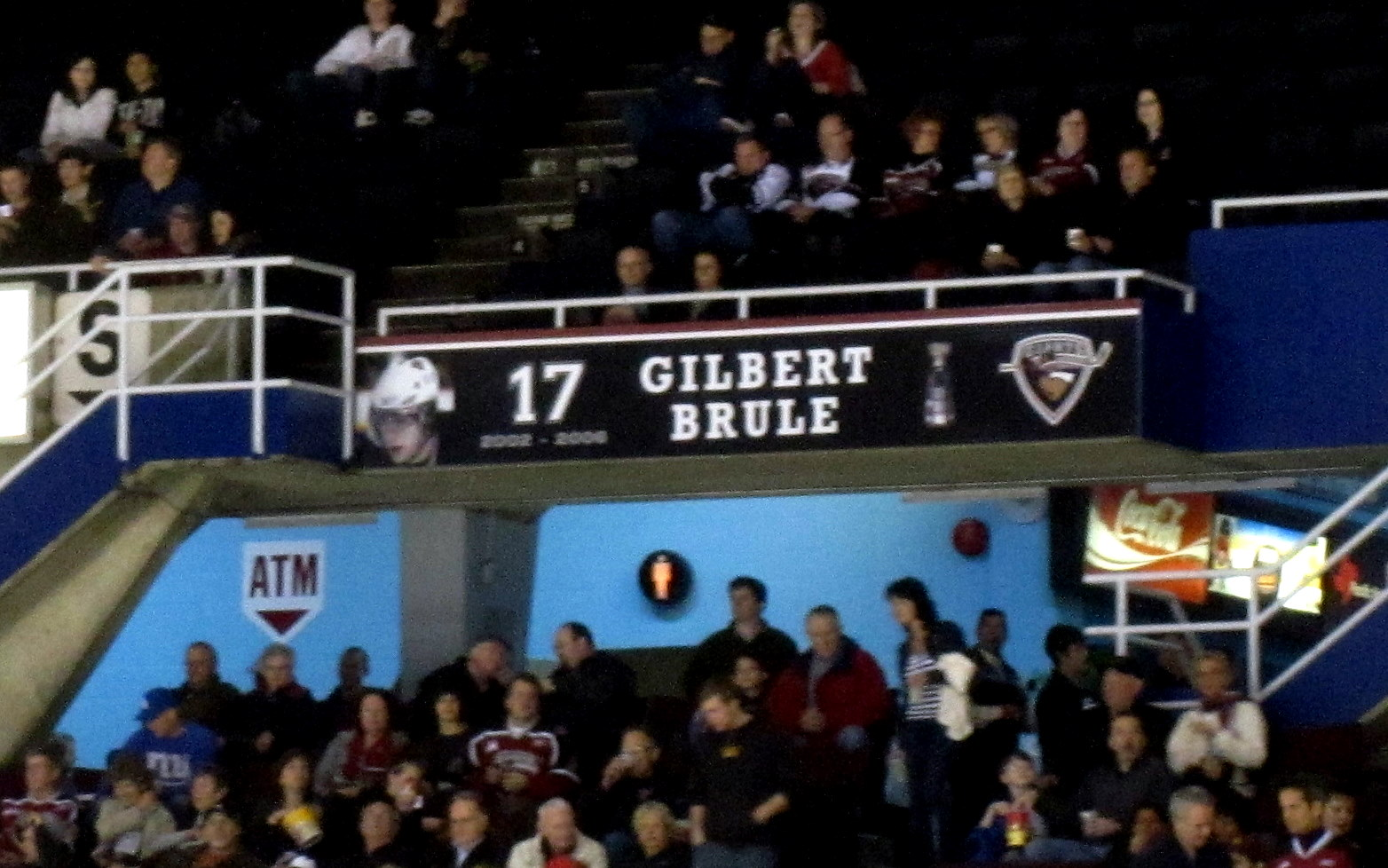
Brulé's Ring of Honour banner on display at the Pacific Coliseum

Four-and-a-half years after his junior career, the club honoured him in a ceremony prior to a game against the Kamloops Blazers on January 28, 2011, as part of "Gilbert Brulé Night". Brulé was the fourth alumnus added to the club's Ring of Honour, commemorating the team's best players; a plaque was unveiled inside the stadium bearing his name and the number 17 he wore on his jersey as a Giant. At the end of the Giants' 2010–11 WHL season, they released their fan-voted "Top 10 Giants of the Decade", which listed Brulé at #2, behind Milan Lucic.

=== Columbus Blue Jackets ===
Still eligible for junior, Brulé made the Blue Jackets' roster for the 2006–07 season. A month into the campaign, he was assured by General Manager Doug MacLean that he would not be returned to the Giants as he had been the previous season. He was scratched several times under head coach Gerard Gallant, but after Gallant was replaced by Ken Hitchcock in late-November, he began receiving more playing time. Playing mostly on the fourth line in his rookie season, he averaged 10 minutes of ice time per game. He went on to tally 19 points (9 goals and 10 assists) over 78 games in his first full NHL season.

During his second NHL season, Brulé recorded 9 points (1 goal and 8 assists) over 61 games with the Blue Jackets. He was sent down to the American Hockey League (AHL) in January 2008 for a month-long assignment as his play struggled, notching 5 goals and 10 points in 16 games with the Blue Jackets' minor league affiliate, the Syracuse Crunch. At the end of the Blue Jackets' regular season, Brulé was reassigned to Syracuse for the club's Calder Cup playoff run. Helping the Crunch advance to the second round, he recorded 2 goals and 5 points over 13 post-season games.

=== Edmonton Oilers ===
In the 2008 off-season, Brulé was traded to the Edmonton Oilers for forward Raffi Torres on July 1, 2008. He was one of the final cuts in his first training camp with the Oilers and was assigned to the Springfield Falcons, Edmonton's AHL affiliate. On October 17, 2008, he suffered a knee-on-knee hit from opposing defenceman Adam McQuaid during a game against the Providence Bruins, causing him to miss several contests injured. During a call-up to the NHL later in the season, Brulé scored his first goal with the Oilers on January 11, 2009, in a 2–1 win against the St. Louis Blues. He was reassigned to Springfield 10 days later. Finishing the season with 3 points in 11 games with the Oilers and 24 points in 39 games with the Falcons, he was re-signed by Edmonton in the off-season to a one-year, two-way contract on August 12, 2009.

Brulé began the 2009–10 season as the Oilers' fourth-line centre out of training camp. With improved play and the injury of first-line winger Ales Hemsky, Brulé moved up the Oilers' depth chart and recorded his best statistical season in the NHL. However, after suffering from a recurring flu throughout the campaign, which sidelined him for a combined 11 games, he suffered a high-ankle sprain during a game against the Dallas Stars on April 2, 2010; following a collision with opposing forward Brian Sutherby, his skate got jammed underneath goaltender Kari Lehtonen's pad. The injury sidelined him for the remaining week of the campaign. He finished the season with a career-high 17 goals, 20 assists and 37 points in 65 games, third in team-scoring. Becoming a restricted free agent in the 2010 off-season, Brulé filed for arbitration with the Oilers after failing to come to terms on a new contract. The two sides managed to avoid their arbitration hearing by signing a two-year, $3.7 million deal on July 27, 2010.

After staying healthy through the first three months of the 2010–11 season, Brulé suffered continued injury problems for the rest of the campaign. After being sidelined with a stomach virus for four games, he suffered an abdominal injury the following month and missed 23 additional contests. After returning to the lineup, he sustained a concussion during a game against the Pittsburgh Penguins on March 13, 2011. In total, Brulé missed 39 games with injuries in 2010–11, limiting him to 7 goals and 2 assists.

On June 24, 2011, it was reported that Brulé had been traded along with a fourth-round draft pick to the Los Angeles Kings in exchange for forward Ryan Smyth. Due to health concerns, the deal never materialized as Brulé had not yet been cleared to play following his concussion (under league rules, an injured player can be traded but cannot be bought out, which is what the Kings had planned on doing). Furthermore, Kings General Manager Dean Lombardi made it apparent to the media that the team wanted someone with a smaller salary cap hit if Brulé could not be bought out. The Oilers ultimately acquired Smyth in exchange for forward Colin Fraser (whose cap hit was over $1 million less) and a seventh-round pick in the 2012 draft.

During the off-season, Brulé worked with a sports psychologist to address the mental aspect of his game, including his confidence. Near the end of the Oilers' training camp, on October 2, 2011, he was placed on waivers for the purpose of being assigned to the team's AHL affiliate, the Oklahoma City Barons. (Note: Because Brulé had played 263 NHL games, he needed to clear waivers prior to being assigned to the AHL.) While the departure of Andrew Cogliano in July 2011 made room for Brulé to move up the Oilers' depth chart at centre, the performance of Oilers rookies Ryan Nugent-Hopkins and Anton Lander helped make him expendable. Regarding the move, Oilers General Manager Steve Tambellini described Brulé as having lacked consistency. Brulé cleared waivers two days later; an Edmonton Sun article suggested that he would have likely been picked up by another team if not for his $1.85 million salary.

=== Phoenix Coyotes ===
After recording 18 points (eight goals and ten assists) over 27 games with the Barons, Brulé was recalled by the Oilers on January 9, 2012, in lieu of injured forwards Nugent-Hopkins and Jordan Eberle. In order to join the team, however, he needed to clear re-entry waivers and he was consequently claimed by the Phoenix Coyotes the following day. Brulé debuted with the Coyotes on January 12, playing 14 minutes in a 3–2 shootout loss to the Detroit Red Wings. Two games later, he recorded his first two points as a Coyote, a goal and an assist, in a 6–1 win against the Colorado Avalanche.

A free agent going into the NHL lockout, Brulé opted to sign as a free agent in Switzerland with ZSC Lions of the National League A on a one-year contract August 13, 2012. In the 2012–13 season, he appeared in only 14 games before he requested an immediate release from his contract with the Lions to return to Canada for personal issues on October 23, 2012.

In the following season, Brulé accepted an invitation to the Coyotes' training camp for the 2013–14 season. He was assigned to the Coyotes' AHL affiliate, the Portland Pirates, to begin the season on a try-out contract before on November 30, 2013, re-signing with Phoenix on a one-year, two-way contract. Brulé played three games in his return to the Coyotes before he was reassigned to the Pirates. In declining to report back to the Pirates, Brulé opted to retire from professional hockey on January 1, 2014.

=== Return to hockey ===
On May 12, 2014, reports surfaced that Brulé opted to resume his playing career after signing a one-year contract with Russian club Avtomobilist Yekaterinburg of the Kontinental Hockey League (KHL). After one year in Yekaterinburg, he joined fellow KHL side Medvescak Zagreb of Croatia in July 2015 and had his contract renewed for the 2016–17 season.

On May 25, 2019, Brulé opted to return as a free agent for a second tenure with Kunlun Red Star of the KHL, agreeing to a two-year contract.

== International play ==
Medal record

Representing Canada

Ice hockey

Olympic Games
Bronze medal – third place	2018 Pyeongchang	

U18 Junior World Cup
Gold medal – first place	2004 Czech Republic	

World U17 Hockey Challenge
Silver medal – second place	2004 Canada	

Brulé made his international debut with Hockey Canada representing Team Pacific at the 2004 World U17 Hockey Challenge in Newfoundland. During the semi-final, he scored a goal and three assists, leading Team Pacific to a win against the United States. His efforts earned him his third player of the game award of the tournament. In the gold medal game, Team Pacific lost to Team Ontario 5–2, earning silver. Later that year, he represented Team Canada in the 2004 U18 Junior World Cup as an alternate captain. Brulé helped lead Team Canada to gold, scoring the game-winning goal in the championship match, a 4–1 win against the Czech Republic.

The following year, Brulé participated in the Canadian national junior team's summer development camp in preparation for the 2006 World Junior Championships. At the time of the final roster selection in December 2005, however, Brulé was recovering from a leg injury, suffered during NHL play with the Blue Jackets. He was invited to the team's summer camp again in 2006, but declined, choosing to focus instead on making the roster for Columbus.

== Personal life ==
Brulé was born in Edmonton, Alberta, moving to North Vancouver, British Columbia, during his childhood. He had a sister named Leah who died at the age of 12 as a result of complications from cerebral palsy. Brulé was nine years old at the time of his sister's death and later had her name tattooed on his left wrist. Despite growing up in both Edmonton and Vancouver, Brulé was a childhood fan of the Los Angeles Kings.

In May 2010, Brulé donated $10,000 to a fund assisting an Edmonton boy suffering from lymphatic cystic hydroma. The money was allocated to a costly surgery to be performed in New York, which doctors in Canada were unable to perform. Brulé received further media attention a year later for picking up a pair of hitchhikers who turned out to be Irish rock band U2 frontman Bono and his assistant in a West Vancouver neighbourhood on May 31, 2011. In return, Brulé was given backstage passes for him and his mother, for U2's concert in Edmonton on the next day. During the show, Bono thanked Brulé for the ride.

In July 2013, Brulé revealed in an interview that an adverse relationship with his father may have been at least partly to blame for his floundering NHL career.

== Career statistics ==
=== Regular season and playoffs ===
			Regular season					Playoffs
Season	Team	League	GP	G	A	Pts	PIM	GP	G	A	Pts	PIM
2002–03	Quesnel Millionaires	BCHL	48	32	25	57	71	7	4	7	11	14
2002–03	Vancouver Giants	WHL	1	0	0	0	0	4	1	0	1	0
2003–04	Vancouver Giants	WHL	67	25	35	60	100	11	4	5	9	10
2004–05	Vancouver Giants	WHL	70	39	48	87	169	6	1	3	4	8
2005–06	Columbus Blue Jackets	NHL	7	2	2	4	0	—	—	—	—	—
2005–06	Vancouver Giants	WHL	27	23	15	38	40	18	16	14	30	44
2006–07	Columbus Blue Jackets	NHL	78	9	10	19	28	—	—	—	—	—
2007–08	Columbus Blue Jackets	NHL	61	1	8	9	24	—	—	—	—	—
2007–08	Syracuse Crunch	AHL	16	5	5	10	44	13	2	3	5	16
2008–09	Edmonton Oilers	NHL	11	2	1	3	12	—	—	—	—	—
2008–09	Springfield Falcons	AHL	39	13	11	24	58	—	—	—	—	—
2009–10	Edmonton Oilers	NHL	65	17	20	37	38	—	—	—	—	—
2010–11	Edmonton Oilers	NHL	41	7	2	9	41	—	—	—	—	—
2011–12	Oklahoma City Barons	AHL	27	8	10	18	31	—	—	—	—	—
2011–12	Phoenix Coyotes	NHL	33	5	9	14	11	12	2	1	3	0
2012–13	ZSC Lions	NLA	14	0	6	6	4	—	—	—	—	—
2013–14	Portland Pirates	AHL	11	7	5	12	4	—	—	—	—	—
2013–14	Phoenix Coyotes	NHL	3	0	0	0	2	—	—	—	—	—
2014–15	Avtomobilist Yekaterinburg	KHL	44	10	5	15	49	—	—	—	—	—
2015–16	KHL Medveščak Zagreb	KHL	54	13	11	24	94	—	—	—	—	—
2016–17	KHL Medveščak Zagreb	KHL	16	6	4	10	53	—	—	—	—	—
2016–17	Neftekhimik Nizhnekamsk	KHL	37	12	20	32	28	—	—	—	—	—
2017–18	Traktor Chelyabinsk	KHL	6	0	1	1	0	—	—	—	—	—
2017–18	Kunlun Red Star	KHL	47	17	18	35	48	—	—	—	—	—
2018–19	Sibir Novosibirsk	KHL	30	7	15	22	14	—	—	—	—	—
2019–20	Kunlun Red Star	KHL	44	7	12	19	45	—	—	—	—	—
2020–21	TH Unia Oświęcim	POL	7	2	0	2	4	6	3	2	5	2
NHL totals			299	43	52	95	156	12	2	1	3	0
KHL totals			278	72	87	159	331	—	—	—	—	—

=== International ===
Year	Team	Event	Result	GP	G	A	Pts	PIM
2004	Canada Pacific	U17	2nd place, silver medalist(s)	6	8	5	13	14
2004	Canada	U18	1st place, gold medalist(s)	5	3	0	3	14
2018	Canada	OG	3rd place, bronze medalist(s)	5	2	1	3	25
Junior totals				11	11	5	16	28
Senior totals				5	2	1	3	25

== Awards ==
Award	Year
BCHL
Bruce Allison Memorial Trophy (Interior Conference)	2002–03
CHL
All-Rookie Team	2003–04
Top Prospects Game MVP	2005
Scholastic Player of the Year	2004–05
Second Team All-Star	2004–05
Memorial Cup All-Star Team	2006
Ed Chynoweth Trophy (Memorial Cup leading scorer)	2006
WHL
Jim Piggott Memorial Trophy (rookie of the year)	2003–04
Daryl K. (Doc) Seaman Trophy (scholastic player of the year)	2004–05
West First All-Star Team	2004–05
Player of the Week	February 20, 2006
Player of the Month	February 2006
West Second All-Star Team	2005–06
airBC Trophy (WHL playoff MVP)	2005–06

== Notes ==
Awards and achievements
Preceded by Sidney Crosby	Ed Chynoweth Trophy; 2006	Succeeded by Michal Řepík
Preceded by Shea Weber	WHL Playoff MVP; 2006	Succeeded by Matt Keetley
Preceded by Devan Dubnyk	CHL Scholastic Player of the Year; 2005	Succeeded by Pierre-Marc Guilbault
Preceded by Devan Dubnyk	Daryl K. (Doc) Seaman Trophy; 2005	Succeeded by Brennen Wray
Preceded by Matt Ellison	Jim Piggott Memorial Trophy; 2004	Succeeded by Tyler Plante
Sporting positions
Preceded by Alexandre Picard	Columbus Blue Jackets first-round draft pick 2005	Succeeded by Derick Brassard
