= Greg Stewart (ice hockey) =

Canadian ice hockey player

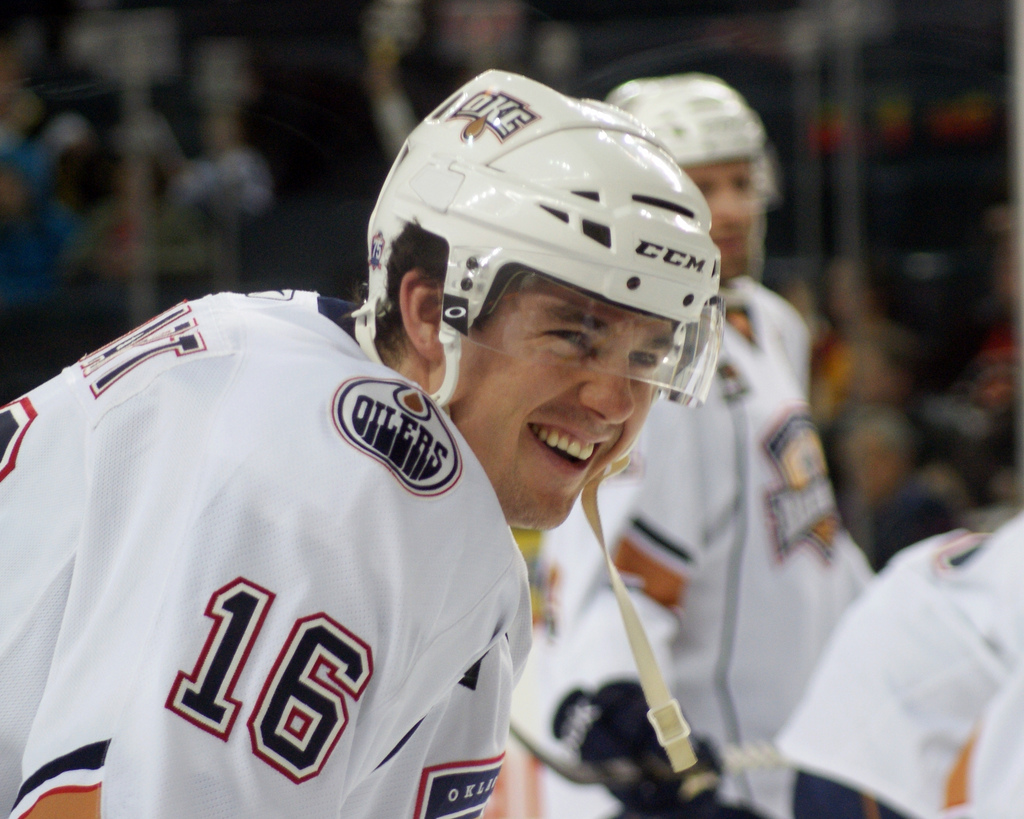
- 2010–11 Oklahoma City Barons
- Born: May 21, 1986 (age 40) Kitchener, Ontario, Canada
- Height: 6 ft 2 in (188 cm)
- Weight: 202 lb (92 kg; 14 st 6 lb)
- Position: Left wing
- Shot: Left
- Played for: Montreal Canadiens; Belfast Giants
- NHL draft: 246th overall, 2004; Montreal Canadiens
- Playing career: 2006–2016

Gregory John Stewart (born May 21, 1986) is a Canadian former professional ice hockey left winger. He played 26 games in the National Hockey League (NHL) with the Montreal Canadiens over three seasons from 2008 to 2009. The rest of his career, which lasted from 2006 to 2016, was mainly spent in the minor leagues. Stewart was born in Kitchener, Ontario.

== Playing career ==
Stewart was drafted in the eighth round, 246th overall in the 2004 NHL entry draft by the Montreal Canadiens from the Peterborough Petes of the Ontario Hockey League (OHL). On May 30, 2006, Greg signed a three-year entry-level contract with the Canadiens. Stewart made his professional debut in the 2006–07 playing the full season with the Cincinnati Cyclones of the ECHL.

In the 2007–08 season, Stewart was assigned to AHL affiliate, the Hamilton Bulldogs, for the majority of the year posting 10 goals in 69 games. On April 2, 2008, he was recalled from the Bulldogs and played his first NHL game on April 5, 2008, in the last game of the regular season against the Toronto Maple Leafs.

Demoted after 5 games with the Canadiens to the Bulldogs in the 2009–10 season. Appearing in 45 games with the Bulldogs for 10 points, Stewart was then loaned to the Chicago Wolves in exchange for Michael Vernace on March 10, 2010.

On July 16, 2010, Stewart signed as a free agent with the Edmonton Oilers to a one-year contract. Stewart played his first pre-season game for Edmonton on September 21, 2010. He scored the game-winning goal, as the Oilers defeated the Vancouver Canucks 3-2.

== Career statistics ==
=== Regular season and playoffs ===
			Regular season					Playoffs
Season	Team	League	GP	G	A	Pts	PIM	GP	G	A	Pts	PIM
2001–02	Waterloo Siskins	MWJHL	2	0	2	2	0	—	—	—	—	—
2002–03	Waterloo Wolves Midget AAA	AH	—	—	—	—	—	—	—	—	—	—
2002–03	Waterloo Siskins	MWJHL	1	0	1	1	2	—	—	—	—	—
2003–04	Peterborough Petes	OHL	58	4	6	10	76	—	—	—	—	—
2004–05	Peterborough Petes	OHL	68	16	18	34	111	14	3	3	6	20
2005–06	Peterborough Petes	OHL	60	24	15	39	83	19	1	6	7	30
2005–06	Peterborough Petes	M-Cup	—	—	—	—	—	4	1	0	1	4
2006–07	Cincinnati Cyclones	ECHL	62	8	15	23	126	10	5	2	7	36
2007–08	Montreal Canadiens	NHL	1	0	0	0	5	—	—	—	—	—
2007–08	Hamilton Bulldogs	AHL	69	10	7	17	137	—	—	—	—	—
2008–09	Montreal Canadiens	NHL	20	0	1	1	32	2	0	0	0	2
2008–09	Hamilton Bulldogs	AHL	51	7	10	17	170	2	1	0	1	9
2009–10	Montreal Canadiens	NHL	5	0	0	0	11	—	—	—	—	—
2009–10	Hamilton Bulldogs	AHL	45	5	5	10	90	—	—	—	—	—
2009–10	Chicago Wolves	AHL	9	1	0	1	39	10	0	1	1	20
2010–11	Oklahoma City Barons	AHL	74	6	10	16	108	6	0	2	2	21
2011–12	South Carolina Stingrays	ECHL	24	7	5	12	46	7	3	3	6	13
2012–13	Belfast Giants	EIHL	39	13	19	32	136	4	0	1	1	4
2013–14	Dundas Real McCoys	ACH	6	4	4	8	6	7	7	0	22
2014–15	Gander Flyers	NSHL	8	1	1	2	14	—	—	—	—	—
2014–15	Dundas Real McCoys	ACH	11	2	7	9	28	6	2	4	6	12
2015–16	Dundas Real McCoys	ACH	4	0	2	2	11	1	1	1	2	0
AHL totals			248	29	32	61	544	18	1	3	4	50
NHL totals			26	0	1	1	48	2	0	0	0	2
