= 2005 in ice hockey =

The following is a chronicle of events during the year 2005 in ice hockey.

== National Hockey League ==
- 2004–05 NHL season: The Stanley Cup was not awarded for the first time since 1919 as a result of the 2004–05 NHL lockout.
- On February 16, commissioner Gary Bettman announced the final cancellation of the NHL season. The lockout would be resolved on July 13 when an agreement was reached in principle. The lockout officially ended on July 22 when the owners ratified the agreement, ending the 310-day labour stoppage.
- On October 5, the puck dropped to open the 2005–06 NHL season in 15 cities, as for the first time in NHL history, all 30 teams were in action on the same night. The NHL also introduced a new, modernized logo, and implemented several rule changes, most notably the shoot out as part of the league's relaunch.

== Canadian Hockey League ==
- The 2005 Memorial Cup was won by the London Knights, who defeated the Rimouski Océanic 4–0 in the final held at London, Ontario.
- Ontario Hockey League: The London Knights defeated the Ottawa 67's to capture the J. Ross Robertson Cup, the first championship in the Knights' 40-year history.
- Quebec Major Junior Hockey League: The Rimouski Océanic captured their first President's Cup by defeating the Halifax Mooseheads.
- Western Hockey League: The Kelowna Rockets won their second President's Cup in three years by defeating the Brandon Wheat Kings.
- The London Knights broke the CHL record for longest undefeated streak, going 31 games (29-0-2) without a loss to begin the season. The previous record was 29 games, held by the WHL's Brandon Wheat Kings.
- The Calgary Hitmen took advantage of the NHL's labour stoppage to shatter the WHL and CHL attendance records, drawing 362,227 fans. Their per-game average of 10,062 was the highest average of any North American professional or junior team.

== International Hockey ==
- The Czech Republic defeated Canada 3–0 to win the gold medal at the 2005 Men's World Ice Hockey Championships. Russia won the bronze.
- The United States defeated Canada 1–0 in a shoot out to win the gold medal in the 2005 Women's World Ice Hockey Championships. Sweden won the bronze. The result was sharply criticized in Canada, where many felt that using the shoot out in the final cheapened the tournament. It was commonly noted that Canada did not allow a single goal in the entire tournament, yet did not win the gold medal.
- Canada ended a seven-year drought by winning the gold medal at the 2005 World Junior Ice Hockey Championships in one of the most dominating performances in tournament history. Russia won the silver, and the Czech Republic won the bronze in the tournament held at Grand Forks, North Dakota.

== European Hockey ==
- Russian Hockey Super League: The Russian national championship was captured by HC Dynamo Moscow.
- Elitserien: Frölunda HC captured the Swedish Elite League title.
- SM-liiga: Kärpät won their second consecutive Finnish national championship.
- Deutsche Eishockey Liga: Eisbären Berlin won the German national championship.

== Minor League hockey ==
- American Hockey League: The Philadelphia Phantoms won the Calder Cup, defeating the Chicago Wolves.
- ECHL: The Trenton Titans won the Kelly Cup.
- United Hockey League: The Muskegon Fury captured their second consecutive Colonial Cup.
- Central Hockey League: The Colorado Eagles won the Ray Miron President's Cup.

== Junior A hockey ==
- Canadian Junior A Hockey League:The Weyburn Red Wings of the SJHL defeated the Camrose Kodiaks of the AJHL to win the 2005 Royal Bank Cup as Canadian "Junior A" national champions.
- United States Hockey League:The Cedar Rapids Roughriders captured the Clark Cup.

== Women's ice hockey ==
- The Minnesota Golden Gophers women's ice hockey program defeated the Harvard Crimson women's ice hockey in the 2005 NCAA National Collegiate Women's Ice Hockey Tournament.
