= Dustin Slade =

Canadian former ice hockey goaltender (born 1986)

- Born: February 28, 1986 (age 39); Penticton, British Columbia, Canada
- Height: 5 ft 11 in (180 cm)
- Weight: 190 lb (86 kg; 13 st 8 lb)
- Position: Goaltender
- Shot: Left
- NHL draft: Undrafted
- Playing career: 2003–2007

Dustin Slade (born February 28, 1986) is a Canadian former ice hockey goaltender. Slade last played with the Halifax Wolverines of the Maritime Junior A Hockey League (MJAHL) after quitting the Vancouver Giants of the Western Hockey League (WHL), with whom he won a President's Cup as league champions and was a WHL West First Team All-Star.

== Playing career ==
Slade began his major junior career in the Western Hockey League (WHL) with the Kamloops Blazers in 2002–03, while still playing the majority of the season in the British Columbia Hockey League (BCHL) with the Quesnel Millionaires. Playing in his WHL rookie season in 2003–04, Slade was transferred twice to the Brandon Wheat Kings, then to the Regina Pats.

Slade ended up returning to the BCHL with the Surrey Eagles in 2004–05 after being suspended by the Pats for disciplinary reasons. He had additionally earned a reputation for being unable to maintain his on-ice composure, at one point, earning 26 penalty minutes in one game. He was subsequently traded to the Vancouver Giants for the 2005–06 season, where he recorded a 1.90 goals against average (GAA) to go with a 36-13-5 record in 56 games. He was named to the WHL West First All-Star Team and earned a WHL Goaltender of the Year nomination (awarded to Justin Pogge of the Calgary Hitmen). He went on to help lead the Giants to the franchise's first President's Cup, earning a berth in the 2006 Memorial Cup, where the Giants were eliminated in the semi-finals. His combined 17 regular season and WHL playoff shutouts established a WHL record.

The following season in 2006-07, Slade began splitting his starts with the younger Tyson Sexsmith, who was emerging as a legitimate goalie in his own right with the Giants. Frustrated by having to give up playing time, on November 20, 2006, he told management he'd rather join the minor professional ranks and left the team. However, unable to find a job in the minor leagues, he made a request to return to the Giants within several months, which went unaccepted. The Giants instead shopped him to interested WHL teams, but did not end up trading him either. As a result, Slade resorted to the Junior A ranks, joining the Halifax Wolverines of the MJAHL in late-January. Slade claimed that before joining the Wolverines, he had a three-year contract with a German professional club that was blocked by the Giants. About a month into his stint with Halifax, Slade was ejected from a game against the Moncton Beavers for a sequence that included a high stick on Beavers' rookie Joel Boffe that required 14 stitches followed by a fight with Pierre-Alexandre Poulin. After completing the season with the Wolverines, Slade has been unable to secure a job with a professional team.

== Awards and honours ==
- WHL West First All-Star Team (2005–06)
- Nominated for the Del Wilson Trophy (Top WHL Goaltender) (2006)
- Ed Chynoweth Cup as a member of the WHL champions Vancouver Giants (2005–06)
