= Nathan Deck =

Canadian ice hockey player

- Born: March 26, 1990 (age 35); Sedley, Saskatchewan, Canada
- Height: 5 ft 10 in (178 cm)
- Weight: 181 lb (82 kg; 12 st 13 lb)
- Position: Defence
- Shoots: Right
- team Former teams: Free Agent; Oklahoma City Barons; Ravensburg Towerstars; Mora IK
- NHL draft: Undrafted
- Playing career: 2011–present

Nathan Deck (born March 26, 1990) is a Canadian professional ice hockey defenceman. He is currently an unrestricted free agent who last played with Swedish club, Mora IK of the HockeyAllsvenskan (Allsv).

Deck began his professional career with the 2011–12 season, playing 60 games in the ECHL with the Stockton Thunder.

Deck was chosen as a starter for the 2012–13 ECHL All-Star Game to be played on January 24, 2013, but was not available for the game due to his call-up to join the Oklahoma City Barons of the American Hockey League He later returned to the Thunder and helped the club advance to the Kelly Cup finals.

On August 2, 2013, Deck re-signed with the Thunder to a further one-year contract. After 40 games with the Thunder, Deck left mid-season to embark on a European career in agreeing to a contract with German club, the Ravensburg Towerstars of the DEL2 for the remainder of the year.
