= 2005–06 QMJHL season =

Canadian junior ice hockey season

The 2005–06 QMJHL season was the 37th season in the history of the Quebec Major Junior Hockey League. The Canadian Hockey League institutes the shootout loss statistic to be recorded in the regular season standings. The league inaugurates the Maurice Filion Trophy for the "General Manager of the Year."

The QMJHL continued to expand eastward, into former American Hockey League markets, by granting franchises in Saint John, New Brunswick and St. John's, Newfoundland and Labrador. The league reorganizes into a West Division, entirely made of teams from the province of Quebec, and an East Division, entirely made of teams in Atlantic Canada. Eighteen teams played 70 games each in the schedule.

Coach Ted Nolan led the Moncton Wildcats to a first overall finish in the regular season, winning their first Jean Rougeau Trophy. The Wildcats also won their first President's Cup, defeating the Quebec Remparts in the finals. Since Moncton was chosen by default (due to no other bids) to host the 2006 Memorial Cup tournament, the Remparts qualified for the Cup as league finalists, and won the Memorial Cup, defeating Moncton in the championship game.

== Team changes ==
- The Saint John Sea Dogs join the league as an expansion franchise.
- The St. John's Fog Devils join the league as an expansion franchise.

== Final standings ==
Note: GP = Games played; W = Wins; L = Losses; OTL = Overtime loss; SL = Shootout loss; PTS = Points; GF = Goals for; GA = Goals against

Western Division	GP	W	L	OTL	SL	Pts	GF	GA
y-Quebec Remparts	70	52	16	1	1	106	349	221
x-Chicoutimi Saguenéens	70	51	15	2	2	106	321	185
x-Rouyn-Noranda Huskies	70	43	22	2	3	91	305	259
x-Gatineau Olympiques	70	40	23	4	3	87	261	215
x-Drummondville Voltigeurs	70	37	28	3	2	79	273	256
x-Shawinigan Cataractes	70	37	28	3	2	79	285	278
x-Baie-Comeau Drakkar	70	30	38	2	0	62	249	285
x-Val-d'Or Foreurs	70	28	39	1	2	59	244	298
x-Victoriaville Tigres	70	26	42	1	1	54	226	302
Rimouski Océanic	70	10	57	2	1	23	184	357

Eastern Division	GP	W	L	OTL	SL	Pts	GF	GA
y-Moncton Wildcats	70	52	15	0	3	107	345	184
x-Acadie-Bathurst Titan	70	43	19	3	5	94	291	223
x-Cape Breton Screaming Eagles	70	40	23	3	4	87	236	206
x-Lewiston Maineiacs	70	36	23	3	8	83	240	207
x-Halifax Mooseheads	70	35	33	1	1	72	246	258
x-St. John's Fog Devils	70	30	34	5	1	66	219	286
x-P.E.I. Rocket	70	25	38	4	3	57	221	304
Saint John Sea Dogs	70	15	47	2	6	38	174	325

y- division champion
x- playoff team

- complete list of standings.

== Scoring leaders ==
Note: GP = Games played; G = Goals; A = Assists; Pts = Points; PIM = Penalty minutes

Player	Team	GP	G	A	Pts	PIM
Alexander Radulov	Quebec Remparts	62	61	91	152	101
Stanislav Lascek	Chicoutimi Saguenéens	64	47	88	135	96
Maxime Boisclair	Chicoutimi Saguenéens	70	70	60	130	97
Olivier Latendresse	Val-d'Or Foreurs	70	41	84	125	83
David Desharnais	Chicoutimi Saguenéens	63	33	85	118	44
Brent Aubin	Rouyn-Noranda / Quebec	72	57	60	117	92
Derick Brassard	Drummondville Voltigeurs	58	44	72	116	92
Alex Bourret	Shawinigan Cataractes	67	44	70	114	133
Philippe Dupuis	Moncton Wildcats	56	32	76	108	52
Mathieu Roy	Acadie-Bathurst Titan	65	50	54	104	101

- complete scoring statistics

== Canada-Russia Challenge ==
The 2005 ADT Canada-Russia Challenge was hosted by the Drummondville Voltigeurs and the Moncton Wildcats. On November 21, 2005, the QMJHL All-stars defeated the Russian Selects 7–4 at the Centre Marcel Dionne. On November 22, 2005, the QMJHL All-stars defeated the Russian Selects 6–4 at the Moncton Coliseum. Since the tournament began in 2003, the QMJHL All-stars and Russian Selects have three wins each.

== Playoffs ==
The top nine teams from the West division, and top seven teams from the Eastern division qualified for the playoffs. The ninth place team in the West division qualified in the Eastern division, and ranked by regular season points. All series were best-of-seven. Divisions crossed over in the semifinals.

Alexander Radulov was the leading scorer of the playoffs with 55 points (21 goals, 34 assists).

Division quarterfinals	Division semifinals
1	Moncton	4
8^{†}	Victoriaville	1
1	Moncton	4
4	Halifax	1
4	Lewiston	2
5	Halifax	4
Eastern Division
2	Acadie-Bathurst	4
7	P.E.I.	2
2	Acadie-Bathurst	4
3	Cape Breton	0
3	Cape Breton	4
6	St. John's	1
1	Quebec	4
8	Val-d'Or	1
1	Quebec	4
6	Shawinigan	1
3	Rouyn-Noranda	1
6	Shawinigan	4
Western Division
2	Chicoutimi	4
7	Baie-Comeau	0
2	Chicoutimi	1
4	Gatineau	4
4	Gatineau	4
5	Drummondville	3

Semifinals
1	Moncton	4
4	Gatineau	1
1	Quebec	4
2	Acadie-Bathurst	3

Finals
E1	Moncton	4
W1	Quebec	2

^{†}Victoriaville seeded 8th in Eastern division.

== All-star teams ==
First team

- Goaltender - Ondrej Pavelec, Cape Breton Screaming Eagles
- Left defence - Kris Letang, Val-d'Or Foreurs
- Right defence - Keith Yandle, Moncton Wildcats
- Left winger - Maxime Boisclair, Chicoutimi Saguenéens
- Centreman - Derick Brassard, Drummondville Voltigeurs
- Right winger - Alexander Radulov, Quebec Remparts

Second team

- Goaltender - Josh Tordjman, Victoriaville Tigres / Moncton Wildcats
- Left defence - Frédéric St-Denis, Drummondville Voltigeurs
- Right defence - Michal Sersen, Quebec Remparts
- Left winger - Alex Bourret, Shawinigan Cataractes
- Centreman - David Desharnais, Chicoutimi Saguenéens
- Right winger - Stanislav Lascek, Chicoutimi Saguenéens

Rookie team

- Goaltender - Ondrej Pavelec, Cape Breton Screaming Eagles
- Left defence - Ivan Vishnevskiy, Rouyn-Noranda Huskies
- Right defence - Andrew Bodnarchuk, Halifax Mooseheads
- Left winger - Felix Schutz, Saint John Sea Dogs
- Centreman - Angelo Esposito, Quebec Remparts
- Right winger - Claude Giroux, Gatineau Olympiques
- List of First/Second/Rookie team all-stars.

== Trophies and awards ==
Team

- President's Cup - Playoff Champions, Moncton Wildcats
- Jean Rougeau Trophy - Regular Season Champions, Moncton Wildcats
- Luc Robitaille Trophy - Team that scored the most goals, Quebec Remparts
- Robert Lebel Trophy - Team with best GAA, Moncton Wildcats

Player

- Michel Brière Memorial Trophy - Most Valuable Player, Alexander Radulov, Quebec Remparts
- Jean Béliveau Trophy - Top Scorer, Alexander Radulov, Quebec Remparts
- Guy Lafleur Trophy - Playoff MVP, Martins Karsums, Moncton Wildcats
- Telus Cup – Offensive - Offensive Player of the Year, Alexander Radulov, Quebec Remparts
- Telus Cup – Defensive - Defensive Player of the Year, Keith Yandle, Moncton Wildcats
- Jacques Plante Memorial Trophy - Best GAA, Ondrej Pavelec, Cape Breton Screaming Eagles
- Guy Carbonneau Trophy - Best Defensive Forward, David Brine, Halifax Mooseheads
- Emile Bouchard Trophy - Defenceman of the Year, Keith Yandle, Moncton Wildcats
- Kevin Lowe Trophy - Best Defensive Defenceman, Olivier Magnan, Rouyn-Noranda Huskies
- Mike Bossy Trophy - Best Pro Prospect, Derick Brassard, Drummondville Voltigeurs
- RDS Cup - Rookie of the Year, Ondrej Pavelec, Cape Breton Screaming Eagles
- Michel Bergeron Trophy - Offensive Rookie of the Year, Angelo Esposito, Quebec Remparts
- Raymond Lagacé Trophy - Defensive Rookie of the Year, Ondrej Pavelec, Cape Breton Screaming Eagles
- Frank J. Selke Memorial Trophy - Most sportsmanlike player, David Desharnais, Chicoutimi Saguenéens
- QMJHL Humanitarian of the Year - Humanitarian of the Year, Joey Ryan, Quebec Remparts
- Marcel Robert Trophy - Best Scholastic Player, Pierre-Marc Guilbault, Shawinigan Cataractes

Executive

- Ron Lapointe Trophy - Coach of the Year, André Tourigny, Rouyn-Noranda Huskies
- Maurice Filion Trophy - General Manager of the Year, Ted Nolan, Moncton Wildcats
- John Horman Trophy - Executive of the Year, Eric Verrier, Drummondville Voltigeurs
- Jean Sawyer Trophy - Marketing Director of the Year, André Gosselin and Stéphane Rhéaume, Drummondville Voltigeurs
- Paul Dumont Trophy - Personality of the Year, Clément Jodoin, Lewiston Maineiacs

== See also ==
- 2006 Memorial Cup
- 2006 NHL entry draft
- 2005–06 OHL season
- 2005–06 WHL season

Preceded by 2004–05 QMJHL season	QMJHL seasons	Succeeded by 2006–07 QMJHL season
