= KCWT =

Television station in Wenatchee, Washington (1984–1993)

- Wenatchee, Washington; United States
- Channels: Analog: 27 (UHF)

Programming
- Affiliations: Independent (1984–1986, 1989–1991); Fox (via KAYU, 1986–1989); Channel America (1989–1991); TBN (1991–1993)

Ownership
- Owner: Central Washington Television, Inc.

History
- First air date: June 29, 1984
- Last air date: September 19, 1993
- Call sign meaning: "Central Washington Television"

KCWT (channel 27) was a television station in Wenatchee, Washington, United States. It operated from 1984 to 1993 under various formats; its last years were under the ownership of Trinity Broadcasting Network, which produced religious broadcasting.

== History ==
KCWT went on the air as an independent station on June 29, 1984, as the "First Television Station in North Central Washington", airing a mix of off-network sitcoms, movies, dramas, and classic cartoons. A newscast was added at 5 and 10 p.m. weeknights to compete with the stations in Seattle and Spokane, to better reflect the views of the Wenatchee area that felt neglected by the two larger markets. They also carried a weeknight Bingo game to get people to tune to the station.

In the fall of 1984, the station started running an hour-long anime block in the afternoons. A year later, they briefly found success when it became one of the first stations in the United States to air the Robotech saga. The show was so popular, that when it was pulled from the schedule after its initial run, a letter writing campaign began to bring it back. They reran it for another year.

KCWT became a satellite of Spokane's KAYU-TV in 1986, mostly simulcasting its entire schedule. Along with the Fox affiliation and new branding as "Fox 27", the quality of programming improved, with first-run syndicated shows as The Disney Afternoon block and Star Trek: The Next Generation.

In 1989, KCWT dropped its Fox affiliation (which later moved to K53CY), and became an independent once again, filling out their programming schedule from the Channel America service. A year later, after new ownership took over, the station became an affiliate of Trinity Broadcasting Network and began broadcasting religious programming in July 1991. The KCWT newsroom was disbanded in 1991; in its absence, KHQ-TV of Spokane added a dedicated Wenatchee Valley bureau.

On September 19, 1993, KCWT was forced off the air after its transmitter (located at Mission Ridge) malfunctioned. The transmitted was never repaired and the station ceased operations; its license was returned to the FCC. The cable channel slot for KCWT, which varied on TCI systems in the region, was later occupied by the then-new premium channel Starz!-Encore 8 in February 1994. The Wenatchee metropolitan area later became part of the Seattle television market.

KCWT's offices (which were located at 32 B North Mission Street, above KPQ-AM and FM) later housed Columbia River Broadcasting's radio cluster of KYVF (later KKXA, now KWLN), KSSY (now KKRV) and KKRT until they relocated in 2008, after KPQ's acquisition by Cherry Creek Radio. The building is now owned by Icicle River Broadcasting, owners of KOHO and KZAL.
