= WHL bantam draft =

Annual Western Hockey League draft

The WHL Bantam Draft is an annual outing, in which the teams of the Western Hockey League (WHL) select players who have graduated from bantam. The draft's order of selection depends on where the team finishes in the league standings. The teams that miss the playoffs are placed into a lottery for the 1st round only. After the 1st round, the teams select in order from fewest to most regular season points.

== History ==
Years ago, WHL teams were allowed to list first-year bantam players as of a set date in September. However, first-year bantams had been playing at the peewee level the previous year, and to list first-year bantams, WHL teams needed to scout the peewee ranks. This had many drawbacks including the need for extensive scouting systems along with the related expense, as well the added pressure on peewee-aged players (12- and 13-year-olds).

To get away from scouting peewees, the WHL instituted a bantam draft. WHL teams send scouts to watch second-year bantams from the start of the minor hockey season. After the season, the WHL holds a draft specifically to allow teams to add bantam players in an orderly manner to their protected lists. While this draft is the first opportunity for teams to select bantam players, it is not the last chance for a player to be listed. After the draft is completed, all the remaining bantams become eligible to be listed by teams, and many will be added as spots become available on team's PPLs, or as a player's talents improve or are more noticeable at a later date or at a higher level of hockey.

During the bantam draft (typically held in early May), players from the four Western Provinces and the states of Alaska, Arizona, California, Colorado, Hawaii, Idaho, Kansas, Minnesota, Montana, Nebraska, Nevada, New Mexico, North Dakota, Oklahoma, Oregon, South Dakota, Texas, Utah, Washington and Wyoming are eligible to be selected.

Players from non-North American countries are allowed to be added in the CHL Import Draft which is held in June.

== Protected player list ==
A team is allowed to add up to 50 players between the ages of 14 and 20 onto its PPL. 14-year-olds may not be added to the list until the Bantam Draft has been completed following their final year at the bantam level.

The 50 Player Protected List is used by the Western Hockey League to ensure there is a method of organization and control in the League for the rights to players. Without this type of built-in control, the system would be problematic.

The 50 Player Protected List works in a very simple manner. Each WHL team is permitted to place a maximum of 50 players between the ages of 14 and 20 on their List. A player may not be added to a WHL List until he has been eligible for the WHL Bantam Draft, which occurs following his final season of bantam hockey.

All players on a WHL team's roster are required to be on the 50 Player Protected List, so if a WHL team is carrying 23 players, this leaves only 27 spots available for future prospects. Needless to say, only the elite players will be represented on a team's List. If a player on the List no longer meets the expectations of the team, he will be replaced by another prospect. As a result, the List is constantly changing as teams evaluate their players and make adjustments. Teams are permitted to make changes to their 50 Player List throughout the entire year.

Roster limits are intended to promote competitive balance across the league. Limiting each team’s List to a maximum of 50 players helps ensure a more even distribution of talent throughout the WHL, while still rewarding organizations that demonstrate strong scouting and player development practices.

With only 50 available spots, this means that decisions must be made carefully so as to ensure the team's future viability. Depending on circumstances, a player may be added or removed from a team's List at any time.

Although many players are added to WHL team Lists during the Bantam Draft, there are also numerous situations where players develop later and are listed at that time. The following WHL stars were not selected in the WHL Bantam Draft but were added to a WHL team's list at a later date: Jarome Iginla, Darcy Tucker, Jeff Friesen, Dan Hamhuis, Scottie Upshall, Joffrey Lupul, Jeff Woywitka, Brendan Witt and Shane Doan.

A player who is on a WHL team's List may not play for another WHL team, or attend another WHL team's training camp or rookie camp. However, being a member of a WHL team's 50 Player Protected List does not restrict a player from playing for, or attending a camp of a non-WHL team. The 50 Player Protected List is used strictly to determine which WHL team holds the player's rights.

The WHL, along with the Ontario Hockey League (OHL) and the Quebec Major Junior Hockey League (QMJHL) comprise the Canadian Hockey League (CHL). Rules are in place to ensure that a player may be selected by only one league

== Recent first overall picks ==
Key

bold	Active in the WHL
^	Jim Piggott Memorial Trophy winner (Rookie of the Year)
*	Four Broncos Memorial Trophy winner (Player of the Year)
^{¤}	No games played in the WHL

Draft	Selected by	Player	Nationality	Position
1990	Victoria Cougars	Darcy Mattersdorfer	Canada	Forward
1991	Tacoma Rockets	Adam Smith	Canada	Defenceman
1992	Red Deer Rebels	Mike McBain	Canada	Defenceman
1993	Victoria Cougars	Martin Hohenberger	Austria	Forward
1994	Prince George Cougars	Jarrett Smith	Canada	Forward
1995	Calgary Hitmen	Chris Nielsen	Canada	Forward
1996	Edmonton Ice	Steve McCarthy	Canada	Defenceman
1997	Edmonton Ice	Jarret Stoll	Canada	Forward
1998	Medicine Hat Tigers	Jay Bouwmeester	Canada	Defenceman
1999	Medicine Hat Tigers	Ryan Hollweg	United States	Forward
2000	Portland Winterhawks	Braydon Coburn ^	Canada	Defenceman
2001	Prince Albert Raiders	Kyle Chipchura	Canada	Forward
2002	Vancouver Giants	Gilbert Brulé ^	Canada	Forward
2003	Tri-City Americans	Jonathan Toews ^{¤}	Canada	Forward
2004	Prince George Cougars	Ryan Kerr	Canada	Defenceman
2005	Regina Pats	Colten Teubert	Canada	Defenceman
2006	Spokane Chiefs	Jared Cowen	Canada	Defenceman
2007	Moose Jaw Warriors	Quinton Howden	Canada	Forward
2008	Red Deer Rebels	Ryan Nugent-Hopkins ^	Canada	Forward
2009	Portland Winterhawks	Derrick Pouliot	Canada	Defenceman
2010	Prince George Cougars	Alex Forsberg	Canada	Forward
2011	Calgary Hitmen	Jake Virtanen	Canada	Forward
2012	Seattle Thunderbirds	Mathew Barzal	Canada	Forward
2013	Vancouver Giants	Tyler Benson	Canada	Forward
2014	Brandon Wheat Kings	Stelio Mattheos	Canada	Forward
2015	Spokane Chiefs	Ty Smith	Canada	Defenceman
2016	Kootenay Ice	Peyton Krebs *	Canada	Forward
2017	Prince Albert Raiders	Kaiden Guhle	Canada	Defenceman
2018	Edmonton Oil Kings	Dylan Guenther ^	Canada	Forward
2019	Winnipeg Ice	Matthew Savoie	Canada	Forward
2020	Regina Pats	Connor Bedard ^	Canada	Forward
2021	Spokane Chiefs	Berkly Catton	Canada	Forward
2022	Medicine Hat Tigers	Gavin McKenna	Canada	Forward
2023	Prince Albert Raiders	Daxon Rudolph	Canada	Defenceman
2024	Everett Silvertips	Landon DuPont	Canada	Defenceman
2025	Regina Pats	Maddox Schultz	Canada	Forward
2026	Kelowna Rockets	Madden Daneault	Canada	Forward
