= KKRT =

Radio station in Wenatchee, Washington

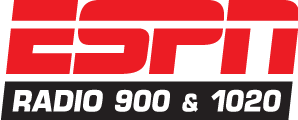
- Wenatchee, Washington; United States
- Frequency: 900 kHz
- Branding: ESPN Radio 900 & 1020

Programming
- Format: Sports
- Affiliations: ESPN Radio; Seattle Mariners Radio Network; Washington-Learfield Sports Network (Football); Gonzaga-Learfield Sports Network (Men's basketball)

Ownership
- Owner: Connoisseur Media; (Alpha Media Licensee LLC)
- Sister stations: KKRV; KWLN

History
- First air date: 1957 (as KUEN)
- Former call signs: KUEN (1957–1985); KSGA (1985–1987); KEYK (1987–1988)
- Call sign meaning: "K-Heart" (previous format)

Technical information
- Licensing authority: FCC
- Facility ID: 28634
- Class: D
- Power: 1,000 watts day; 72 watts night
- Transmitter coordinates: 47°27′43.5″N 120°21′32.3″W
- Repeater: 1020 KWIQ (Moses Lake North)

Links
- Public license information: Public file; LMS
- Webcast: Listen live
- Website: www.kkrt.com

KKRT (900 AM) is a sports radio station. Licensed to Wenatchee, Washington, United States. The station is owned by Connoisseur Media, through Alpha Media Licensee LLC, and features programming from ESPN Radio.

KKRT's programming is simulcast on sister station KWIQ (1020 AM) in Moses Lake North, Washington.

== History ==
KKRT has changed its name various times since its debut. It was first licensed on February 1, 1957, as KUEN. The call sign was changed to KSGA on July 1, 1985, and to KEYK in early January 1987. On October 13, 1988, the call sign was changed again to KKRT when it changed from classic country to adult standards as "K-Heart".

On occasion, during the early 1990s, KKRT was used as a back-up station to carry Seattle Mariners radio broadcast from KWWW, and later, KZPH when there were conflicts with broadcasts for the Washington State Cougars Football Team and the Seattle SuperSonics.

In 1993, the station dropped the standards format, and carried the audio feed of CNN Headline News. It was rebranded as "CNN AM 900".

In 1996, KKRT became the full time Mariners affiliate, and changed to an all sports format as "SportsRadio 900" carrying programming from One-on-One Sports and ESPN Radio. The station also later picked up the local rights to WSU football (which ended in 2015, when the broadcasts moved to KPQ) and the Sonics (which ended after the 2006–07 season, one year before the relocation to Oklahoma City). In 2000, KKRT dropped One-on-One and started carrying the entire ESPN Radio schedule.

In 2021, KKRT replaced most of ESPN Radio's weekday programming with Brock & Salk and Wyman & Bob from Seattle Sports 710. Along with the Mariners, KKRT is the regional affiliate for the Washington Huskies Football Team and the Gonzaga Men's Basketball Team.
