= KPQ =

KPQ may refer to:

- KPQ (AM), a radio station (560 AM) licensed to Wenatchee, Washington, United States
- KPQ-FM, a radio station (102.1 FM) licensed to Wenatchee, Washington, United States
