= KWWX =

KWWX may refer to:

- KYSP, a radio station (1340 AM) licensed to serve Wenatchee, Washington, United States
- KKWN, a radio station (106.7 FM) licensed to serve Cashmere, Washington, which held the call sign KWWX from 2008 to 2015
