= Ed Chynoweth Cup =

Western Hockey League trophy

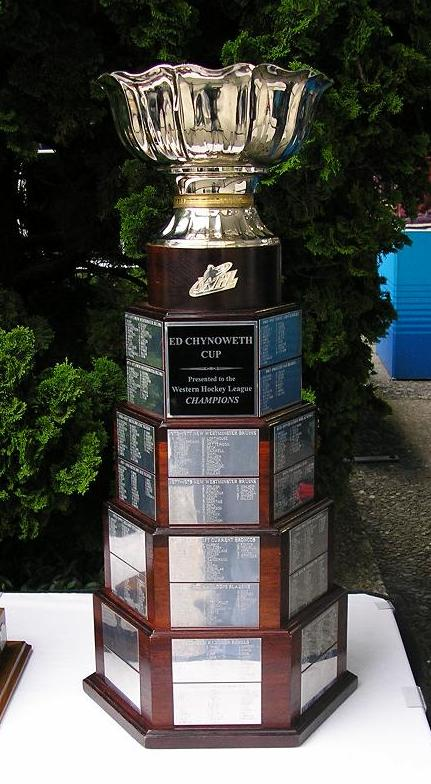
- Sport: Ice hockey
- Competition: Western Hockey League
- Awarded for: Playoff championship

History
- First award: 1966
- First winner: Moose Jaw Canucks
- Most wins: Kamloops Blazers & Medicine Hat Tigers (6)
- Most recent: Everett Silvertips (1)

The Ed Chynoweth Cup is an ice hockey club championship trophy awarded to the playoff champion of the Western Hockey League (WHL). Originally called the President's Cup when the league was founded in 1966, the trophy was renamed in 2007 to honour Ed Chynoweth's long service to junior ice hockey in Canada. The WHL champion earns a berth into the Memorial Cup tournament, Canada's major junior hockey championship. The Kamloops Blazers and Medicine Hat Tigers have won the most WHL championships, with six each. The Spokane Chiefs were the first team to win the renamed trophy in the 2007–08 WHL season. The current (2025–26) holders of the Ed Chynoweth Cup are the Everett Silvertips.

== History ==
The Western Hockey League was founded in 1966 by seven teams from Saskatchewan and Alberta who were hoping to improve the quality of junior hockey in western Canada. Despite gaining approval from the governing bodies of both provinces, the Canadian Amateur Hockey Association (CAHA) objected to the formation of the interprovincial league, refusing to sanction the circuit and suspending all players and officials who participated in the league from participation in any CAHA league or event. Declared an "outlaw league" by the CAHA, the WHL's founders chose to play on, though the league was ruled ineligible to participate in the Memorial Cup, Canada's national junior championship.

The first President's Cup champion was the Moose Jaw Canucks in 1967. In 1971, CAHA reorganized the top level of junior hockey into two tiers, sanctioning the WHL as the top league in western Canada and one of three leagues that formed the Major Junior tier, along with the Ontario Hockey Association—now the Ontario Hockey League (OHL)—and the Quebec Major Junior Hockey League—now the Quebec Maritimes Junior Hockey League (QMJHL). Together, these three leagues form the Canadian Hockey League (CHL). The 1971 WHL champion Edmonton Oil Kings faced the Quebec Remparts in the 1972 Memorial Cup final, which nearly failed to materialize as the OHA and QMJHL initially refused to face the western champion. The Oil Kings were ultimately defeated by Quebec in an abbreviated best-of-three series, as opposed to the normal best-of-seven. Three years later, in 1974, the Regina Pats became the first WHL champion to win the national title.

The New Westminster Bruins emerged as the first dynasty in WHL history, winning four consecutive championships between 1975 and 1978, along with two Memorial Cups in 1977 and 1978. In 1976, the Portland Winter Hawks became the first American-based team in the WHL, and six years later, the 1981–82 Winter Hawks recorded more firsts, becoming the first American team to win the President's Cup and the first American team to compete for the Memorial Cup. One year later, the Winter Hawks won the 1983 Memorial Cup to become the first American champions, and the first to win the Memorial Cup without winning its own league title; Portland participated by virtue of hosting the tournament despite losing the WHL final to the Lethbridge Broncos.

On December 30, 1986, four members of the Swift Current Broncos—Scott Kruger, Trent Kresse, Brent Ruff, and Chris Mantyka—were killed when the team bus crashed outside Swift Current. The community rallied around the team, and less than three years later, the Broncos emerged as the top team in the CHL. Featuring Scott Kruger's younger brothers Darren and Trevor, the 1988–89 Broncos became the first team in WHL history to sweep their way through the playoffs, winning the President's Cup without losing a single game in the post-season. The Broncos faced the host Saskatoon Blades in the 1989 Memorial Cup final, defeating their provincial rivals in the first all-WHL national championship. The Kamloops Blazers dominated the WHL in the early 1990s, capturing four league championships between 1990 and 1995 and three Memorial Cups to cap a period where WHL teams won seven Memorial Cup championships in a nine-year period between 1987 and 1995.

In 2007, the league renamed the championship trophy the Ed Chynoweth Cup in honour of Ed Chynoweth's long tenure with the league. Chynoweth had served as president of both the WHL and CHL, from 1972 and 1975 respectively, until leaving both posts in 1995 to form the Edmonton Ice. He remained with the franchise through its transfer to Kootenay and until his death in 2008. Chynoweth was described by OHL commissioner David Branch as being "the architect of the Canadian Hockey League as we know it today". Chynoweth was posthumously elected to the Hockey Hall of Fame in 2008.

== List of winners ==
- Number in parentheses denotes total championships won to that point

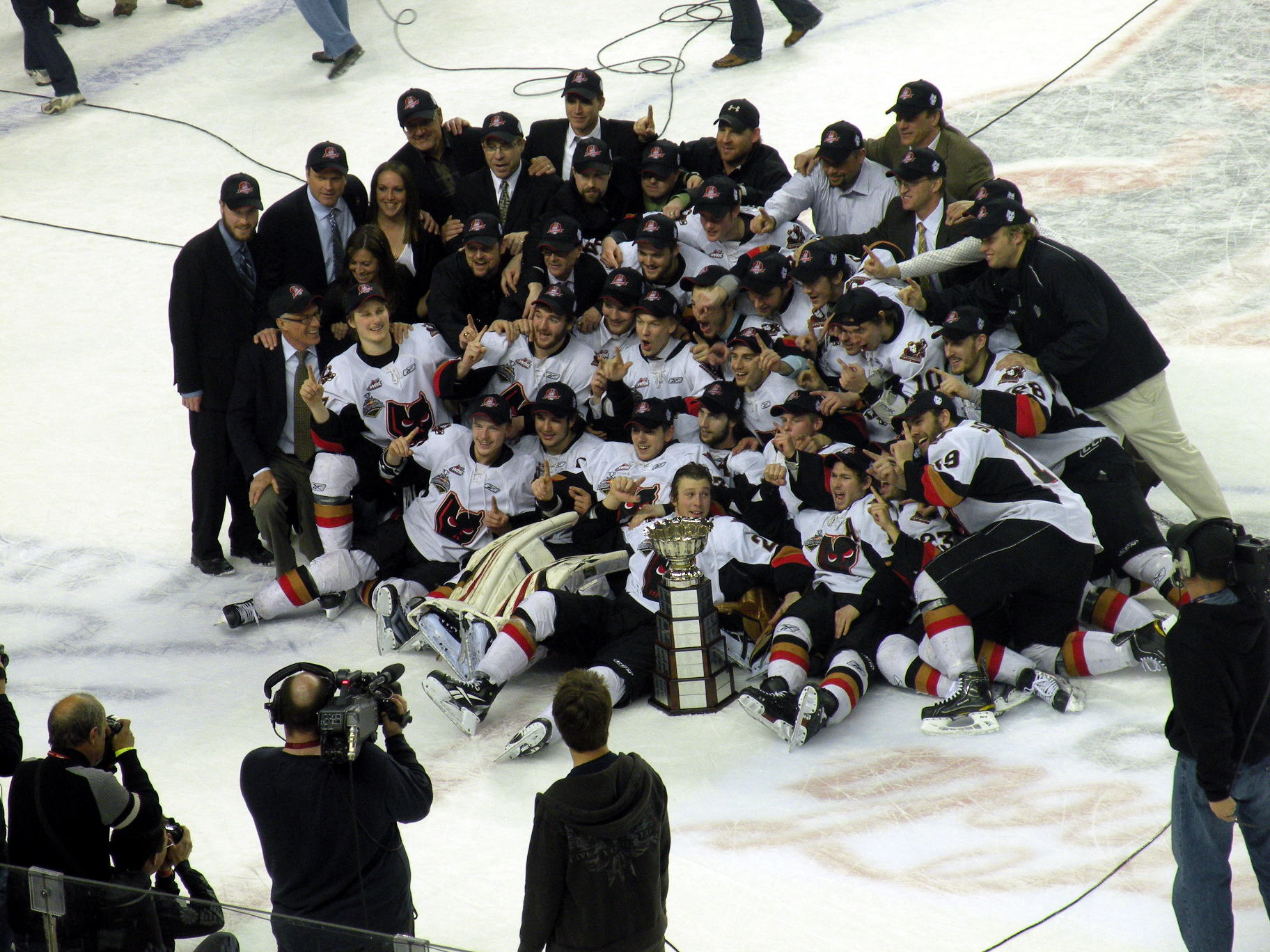
The Calgary Hitmen celebrate after winning the 2010 championship

=== By season ===
| Season | Winning team | Finalist | Games^{[a]} | Memorial Cup result |
|---|---|---|---|---|
| 1966–67 | Moose Jaw Canucks (1) | Regina Pats | 4–1 | Ineligible^{[b]} |
| 1967–68 | Estevan Bruins (1) | Flin Flon Bombers | 4–0–1 | Estevan lost final^{[b]} |
| 1968–69 | Flin Flon Bombers (1) | Edmonton Oil Kings | 4–2 | Ineligible^{[b]} |
| 1969–70 | Flin Flon Bombers (2) | Edmonton Oil Kings | 4–0 | Ineligible^{[b]} |
| 1970–71 | Edmonton Oil Kings (1) | Flin Flon Bombers | 4–1–1 | Edmonton lost final |
| 1971–72 | Edmonton Oil Kings (2) | Regina Pats | 4–1 | Edmonton finished third |
| 1972–73 | Medicine Hat Tigers (1) | Saskatoon Blades | 3–0–2 | Medicine Hat finished third |
| 1973–74 | Regina Pats (1) | Calgary Centennials | 4–0 | Regina won Memorial Cup |
| 1974–75 | New Westminster Bruins (1) | Saskatoon Blades | 4–3 | New Westminster lost final |
| 1975–76 | New Westminster Bruins (2) | Saskatoon Blades | 4–2–1 | New Westminster lost final |
| 1976–77 | New Westminster Bruins (3) | Brandon Wheat Kings | 4–1 | New Westminster won Memorial Cup |
| 1977–78 | New Westminster Bruins (4) | Billings Bighorns | 4–0 | New Westminster won Memorial Cup |
| 1978–79 | Brandon Wheat Kings (1) | Portland Winter Hawks | 4–2 | Brandon lost final |
| 1979–80 | Regina Pats (2) | Victoria Cougars | 4–1 | Regina finished third |
| 1980–81 | Victoria Cougars (1) | Calgary Wranglers | 4–3 | Victoria finished third |
| 1981–82 | Portland Winter Hawks (1) | Regina Pats | 4–1 | Portland finished third |
| 1982–83 | Lethbridge Broncos (1) | Portland Winter Hawks | 4–1 | Portland won Memorial Cup^{[c]} Lethbridge finished fourth |
| 1983–84 | Kamloops Junior Oilers (1) | Regina Pats | 4–3 | Kamloops finished third |
| 1984–85 | Prince Albert Raiders (1) | Kamloops Blazers | 4–0 | Prince Albert won Memorial Cup |
| 1985–86 | Kamloops Blazers (2) | Medicine Hat Tigers | 4–1 | Kamloops finished third Portland finished fourth^{[d]} |
| 1986–87 | Medicine Hat Tigers (2) | Portland Winter Hawks | 4–3 | Medicine Hat won Memorial Cup |
| 1987–88 | Medicine Hat Tigers (3) | Kamloops Blazers | 4–2 | Medicine Hat won Memorial Cup |
| 1988–89 | Swift Current Broncos (1) | Portland Winterhawks | 4–0 | Swift Current won Memorial Cup; Saskatoon lost final^{[e]} |
| 1989–90 | Kamloops Blazers (3) | Lethbridge Hurricanes | 4–1 | Kamloops finished fourth |
| 1990–91 | Spokane Chiefs (1) | Lethbridge Hurricanes | 4–0 | Spokane Won Memorial Cup |
| 1991–92 | Kamloops Blazers (4) | Saskatoon Blades | 4–3 | Kamloops won Memorial Cup; Seattle finished third^{[f]} |
| 1992–93 | Swift Current Broncos (2) | Portland Winter Hawks | 4–3 | Swift Current finished fourth |
| 1993–94 | Kamloops Blazers (5) | Saskatoon Blades | 4–3 | Kamloops Won Memorial Cup |
| 1994–95 | Kamloops Blazers (6) | Brandon Wheat Kings | 4–2 | Kamloops won Memorial Cup; Brandon finished third^{[g]} |
| 1995–96 | Brandon Wheat Kings (2) | Spokane Chiefs | 4–1 | Brandon finished third |
| 1996–97 | Lethbridge Hurricanes (1) | Seattle Thunderbirds | 4–0 | Lethbridge lost final |
| 1997–98 | Portland Winter Hawks (2) | Brandon Wheat Kings | 4–0 | Portland won Memorial Cup; Spokane finished third^{[h]} |
| 1998–99 | Calgary Hitmen (1) | Kamloops Blazers | 4–1 | Calgary lost final |
| 1999–2000 | Kootenay Ice (1) | Spokane Chiefs | 4–2 | Kootenay finished fourth |
| 2000–01 | Red Deer Rebels (1) | Portland Winter Hawks | 4–1 | Red Deer won Memorial Cup; Regina finished third^{[i]} |
| 2001–02 | Kootenay Ice (2) | Red Deer Rebels | 4–2 | Kootenay won Memorial Cup |
| 2002–03 | Kelowna Rockets (1) | Red Deer Rebels | 4–2 | Kelowna finished third |
| 2003–04 | Medicine Hat Tigers (4) | Everett Silvertips | 4–0 | Kelowna won Memorial Cup^{[j]} Medicine Hat finished third |
| 2004–05 | Kelowna Rockets (2) | Brandon Wheat Kings | 4–1 | Kelowna finished fourth |
| 2005–06 | Vancouver Giants (1) | Moose Jaw Warriors | 4–0 | Vancouver finished third |
| 2006–07 | Medicine Hat Tigers (5) | Vancouver Giants | 4–3 | Vancouver won Memorial Cup^{[k]} Medicine Hat lost final |
| 2007–08 | Spokane Chiefs (2) | Lethbridge Hurricanes | 4–0 | Spokane won Memorial Cup |
| 2008–09 | Kelowna Rockets (3) | Calgary Hitmen | 4–2 | Kelowna lost final |
| 2009–10 | Calgary Hitmen (2) | Tri-City Americans | 4–1 | Brandon lost final^{[l]} Calgary finished third |
| 2010–11 | Kootenay Ice (3) | Portland Winterhawks | 4–1 | Kootenay finished third |
| 2011–12 | Edmonton Oil Kings (1) | Portland Winterhawks | 4–3 | Edmonton finished fourth |
| 2012–13 | Portland Winterhawks (3) | Edmonton Oil Kings | 4–2 | Portland lost final^{[m]} Saskatoon finished fourth |
| 2013–14 | Edmonton Oil Kings (2) | Portland Winterhawks | 4–3 | Edmonton won Memorial Cup |
| 2014–15 | Kelowna Rockets (4) | Brandon Wheat Kings | 4–0 | Kelowna lost final |
| 2015–16 | Brandon Wheat Kings (3) | Seattle Thunderbirds | 4–1 | Brandon finished fourth Red Deer lost semifinal |
| 2016–17 | Seattle Thunderbirds (1) | Regina Pats | 4–2 | Seattle finished fourth |
| 2017–18 | Swift Current Broncos (3) | Everett Silvertips | 4–2 | Swift Current finished fourth Regina lost final |
| 2018–19 | Prince Albert Raiders (2) | Vancouver Giants | 4–3 | Prince Albert finished fourth |
| 2019–20 | WHL playoffs cancelled due to the COVID-19 pandemic — Ed Chynoweth Cup not awarded | | | |
| 2020–21 | WHL playoffs cancelled due to the COVID-19 pandemic — Ed Chynoweth Cup not awarded | | | |
| 2021–22 | Edmonton Oil Kings (3) | Seattle Thunderbirds | 4–2 | Edmonton finished fourth |
| 2022–23 | Seattle Thunderbirds (2) | Winnipeg Ice | 4–1 | Seattle lost final |
| 2023–24 | Moose Jaw Warriors (1) | Portland Winterhawks | 4–0 | Moose Jaw lost semifinal |
| 2024–25 | Medicine Hat Tigers (6) | Spokane Chiefs | 4–1 | Medicine Hat lost final |
| 2025–26 | Everett Silvertips (1) | Prince Albert Raiders | 4–1 | Everett lost final |

=== By team ===
| Team | Won | Lost | Years won | Years lost | Finals appearances |
|---|---|---|---|---|---|
| Kamloops Blazers^{[n]} | 6 | 3 | 1983–84, 1985–86, 1989–90, 1991–92, 1993–94, 1994–95 | 1984–85, 1987–88, 1998–99 | 9 |
| Medicine Hat Tigers | 6 | 1 | 1972–73, 1986–87, 1987–88, 2003–04, 2006–07, 2024–25 | 1985–86 | 7 |
| Edmonton Oil Kings^{[o]} | 5 | 3 | 1970–71, 1971–72, 2011–12, 2013–14, 2021–22 | 1968–69, 1969–70, 2012–13 | 8 |
| New Westminster Bruins | 4 | 0 | 1974–75, 1975–76, 1976–77, 1977–78 | — | 4 |
| Kelowna Rockets | 4 | 0 | 2002–03, 2004–05, 2008–09, 2014–15 | — | 4 |
| Portland Winterhawks | 3 | 10 | 1981–82, 1997–98, 2012–13 | 1978–79, 1982–83, 1986–87, 1988–89, 1992–93, 2000–01, 2010–11, 2011–12, 2013–14, 2023–24 | 13 |
| Brandon Wheat Kings | 3 | 5 | 1978–79, 1995–96, 2015–16 | 1976–77, 1994–95, 1997–98, 2004–05, 2014–15 | 8 |
| Swift Current Broncos | 3 | 0 | 1988–89, 1992–93, 2017–18 | — | 3 |
| Kootenay Ice | 3 | 0 | 1999–2000, 2001–02, 2010–11 | — | 3 |
| Regina Pats | 2 | 5 | 1973–74, 1979–80 | 1966–67, 1971–72, 1981–82, 1983–84, 2016–17 | 7 |
| Seattle Thunderbirds | 2 | 3 | 2016–17, 2022–23 | 1996–97, 2015–16, 2021–22 | 5 |
| Flin Flon Bombers | 2 | 2 | 1968–69, 1969–70 | 1967–68, 1970–71 | 4 |
| Spokane Chiefs | 2 | 3 | 1990–91, 2007–08 | 1995–96, 1999–2000, 2024–25 | 5 |
| Calgary Hitmen | 2 | 1 | 1998–99, 2009–10 | 2008–09 | 3 |
| Prince Albert Raiders | 2 | 1 | 1984–85, 2018–19 | 2025–26 | 3 |
| Lethbridge Hurricanes | 1 | 3 | 1996–97 | 1989–90, 1990–91, 2007–08 | 4 |
| Red Deer Rebels | 1 | 2 | 2000–01 | 2001–02, 2002–03 | 3 |
| Vancouver Giants | 1 | 2 | 2005–06 | 2006–07, 2018–19 | 3 |
| Everett Silvertips | 1 | 2 | 2025–26 | 2003–04, 2017–18 | 3 |
| Victoria Cougars | 1 | 1 | 1980–81 | 1979–80 | 2 |
| Moose Jaw Warriors | 1 | 1 | 2023–24 | 2005–06 | 2 |
| Moose Jaw Canucks | 1 | 0 | 1966–67 | — | 1 |
| Estevan Bruins | 1 | 0 | 1967–68 | — | 1 |
| Lethbridge Broncos | 1 | 0 | 1982–83 | — | 1 |
| Saskatoon Blades | 0 | 5 | — | 1972–73, 1974–75, 1975–76, 1991–92, 1993–94 | 5 |
| Calgary Centennials | 0 | 1 | — | 1973–74 | 1 |
| Billings Bighorns | 0 | 1 | — | 1977–78 | 1 |
| Calgary Wranglers | 0 | 1 | — | 1980–81 | 1 |
| Tri-City Americans | 0 | 1 | — | 2009–10 | 1 |
| Winnipeg Ice | 0 | 1 | — | 2022–23 | 1 |

== See also ==
- J. Ross Robertson Cup (OHL championship)
- President's Cup (QMJHL championship)
- List of Memorial Cup champions

== Notes ==
- ^{a} In some playoff years, ties were possible, and are noted in win–loss–tie format
- ^{b} The league did not receive official sanctioning by the Canadian Amateur Hockey Association until 1971, and thus was not eligible to compete for the Memorial Cup between 1967 and 1970. In spite of this, the 1968 Estevan Bruins did compete in the Memorial Cup final, the only team in the WHL's first four years permitted to do so.
- ^{c} Portland qualified for the 1983 Memorial Cup as the host team.
- ^{d} Portland qualified for the 1986 Memorial Cup as the host team after New Westminster withdrew as the host.
- ^{e} Saskatoon qualified for the 1989 Memorial Cup as the host team.
- ^{f} Seattle qualified for the 1992 Memorial Cup as the host team.
- ^{g} Kamloops both hosted the 1995 Memorial Cup and qualified as the league winner. As the losing finalist, Brandon played as the WHL's second representative.
- ^{h} Spokane qualified for the 1998 Memorial Cup as the host team.
- ^{i} Regina qualified for the 2001 Memorial Cup as the host team.
- ^{j} Kelowna qualified for the 2004 Memorial Cup as the host team.
- ^{k} Vancouver qualified for the 2007 Memorial Cup as the host team.
- ^{l} Brandon qualified for the 2010 Memorial Cup as the host team.
- ^{m} Saskatoon qualified for the 2013 Memorial Cup as the host team.
- ^{n} Kamloops' first title was won as the Junior Oilers, before being renamed the Blazers.
- ^{o} The original Oil Kings moved to Portland in 1976; the team was revived via expansion in 2007.
