= Michael Milne (ice hockey) =

Canadian ice hockey player (born 2002)

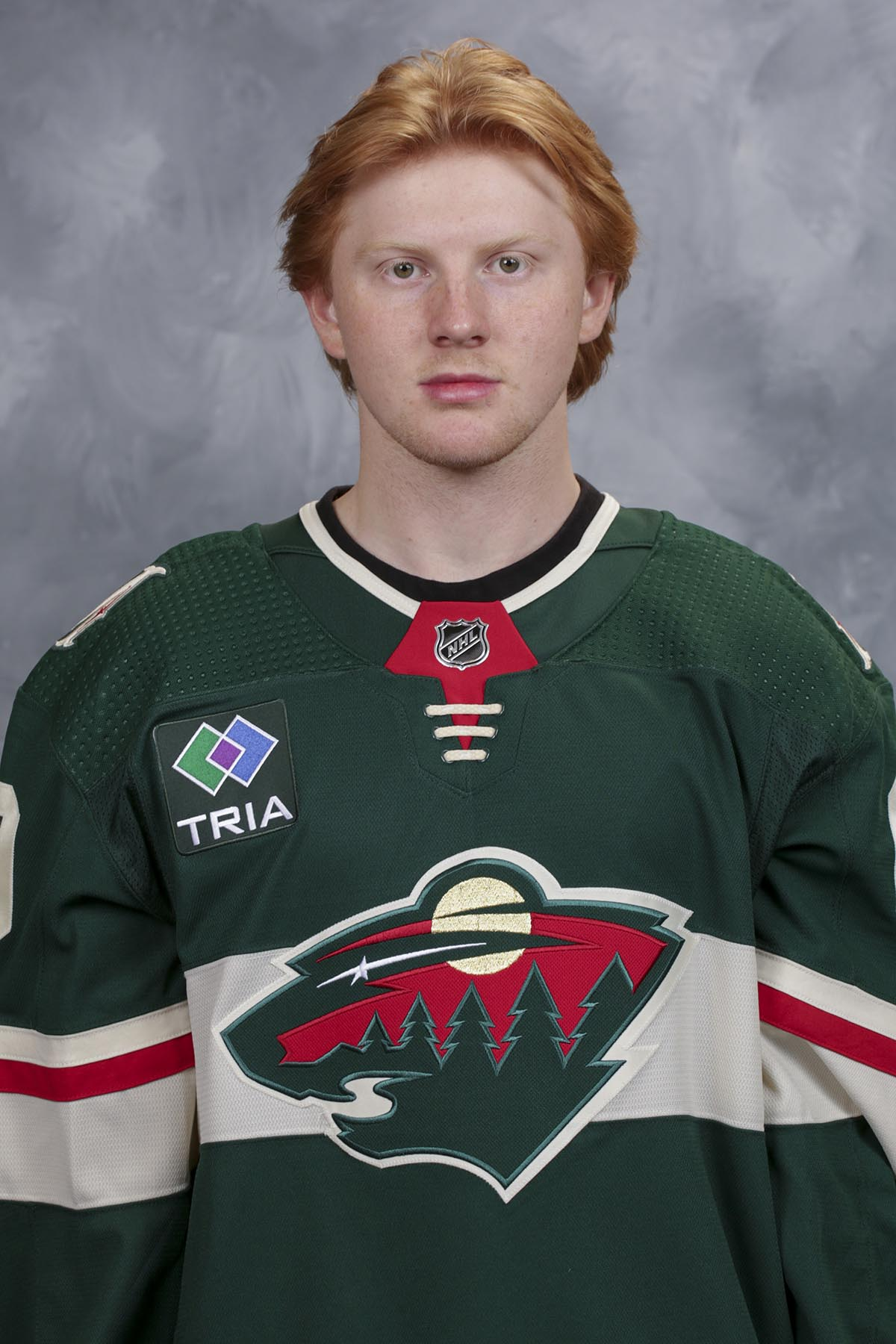
- Milne with the Minnesota Wild in 2022
- Born: September 21, 2002 (age 24) Abbotsford, British Columbia, Canada
- Height: 5 ft 11 in (180 cm)
- Weight: 185 lb (84 kg; 13 st 3 lb)
- Position: Left wing
- Shoots: Left
- AHL team Former teams: Manitoba Moose; Minnesota Wild
- NHL draft: 89th overall, 2022; Minnesota Wild
- Playing career: 2022–present

Michael Milne (born September 21, 2002) is a Canadian professional ice hockey left winger for the Manitoba Moose of the American Hockey League (AHL). The Minnesota Wild selected Milne in the third round, 89th overall, of the 2022 NHL entry draft.

== Early life ==
Milne was born September 21, 2002, in Abbotsford, British Columbia, to Deryn and Jerry Milne. He grew up playing minor ice hockey in Abbotsford before moving on to Yale Hockey Academy and the Fraser Valley Thunderbirds. He played two seasons in the Canadian Sport School Hockey League with Yale. During the 2017–18 season, Milne led the Yale U16 Prep team with 50 points in 27 games.

== Playing career ==
=== Junior ===
The Kootenay Ice of the Western Hockey League (WHL) selected Milne in the eighth round, 155th overall, of the 2017 WHL bantam draft. He joined the team for the 2018–19 season, recording 7 points in 40 rookie games. The next two years with the Winnipeg Ice, Milne had 45 points in 47 games. Although he was eligible for the 2021 NHL entry draft, a shoulder injury and the effects of the COVID-19 pandemic limited Milne to 14 games with the Ice, during which he had six goals and 12 points. During the 2021–22 season, Milne had a strong year in Winnipeg, with 38 goals and 81 points.

=== Professional ===
The Minnesota Wild of the National Hockey League (NHL) selected Milne in the third round, 89th overall, of the 2022 NHL entry draft. He signed a three-year entry-level contract with the Wild on October 19. Milne began his professional hockey career with the Iowa Wild, Minnesota's American Hockey League (AHL) affiliate, in 2022. In 107 AHL games to start his career, Milne recorded 19 goals and 42 points, and he appeared in two postseason games during the 2023 Calder Cup playoffs. Ahead of the 2024–25 season, Milne missed Wild rookie camp and training camp due to injury, and he opened the season in Iowa. After recording four goals and eight points through his first ten games, Milne was promoted to the Minnesota Wild on November 13. He made his NHL debut against the Dallas Stars on November 16, playing on the fourth line with Jakub Lauko and Marat Khusnutdinov.

The Wild signed Milne to a one-year, two-way contract extension on July 11, 2025.

On December 28, 2025, Milne was traded to the Tampa Bay Lightning in exchange for Boris Katchouk. Several months later, on March 12, 2026, Milne was traded to the Detroit Red Wings, alongside Wojciech Stachowiak, in exchange for Ian Mitchell. Milne played out the remainder of his contract within the Red Wings organization with affiliate, the Grand Rapids Griffins.

As a free agent from the Red Wings, Milne was signed to a one-year AHL contract with the Manitoba Moose, affiliate to the Winnipeg Jets, on July 21, 2026.

== Career statistics ==
			Regular season					Playoffs
Season	Team	League	GP	G	A	Pts	PIM	GP	G	A	Pts	PIM
2018–19	Kootenay Ice	WHL	40	3	4	7	12	—	—	—	—	—
2019–20	Winnipeg Ice	WHL	53	13	20	33	32	—	—	—	—	—
2020–21	Winnipeg Ice	WHL	14	6	6	12	4	—	—	—	—	—
2021–22	Winnipeg Ice	WHL	68	38	43	81	55	15	13	6	19	4
2022–23	Iowa Wild	AHL	57	7	6	13	12	2	0	0	0	0
2023–24	Iowa Wild	AHL	40	8	13	21	34	—	—	—	—	—
2024–25	Iowa Wild	AHL	60	15	11	26	44	—	—	—	—	—
2024–25	Minnesota Wild	NHL	1	0	0	0	0	—	—	—	—	—
2025–26	Iowa Wild	AHL	15	2	3	5	14	—	—	—	—	—
2025–26	Syracuse Crunch	AHL	19	0	1	1	18	—	—	—	—	—
2025–26	Grand Rapids Griffins	AHL	5	0	0	0	4	—	—	—	—	—
2025–26	Toledo Walleye	ECHL	5	0	2	2	2	12	4	5	9	2
NHL totals			1	0	0	0	0	—	—	—	—	—
