= Cale Fleury =

Canadian ice hockey player (born 1998)

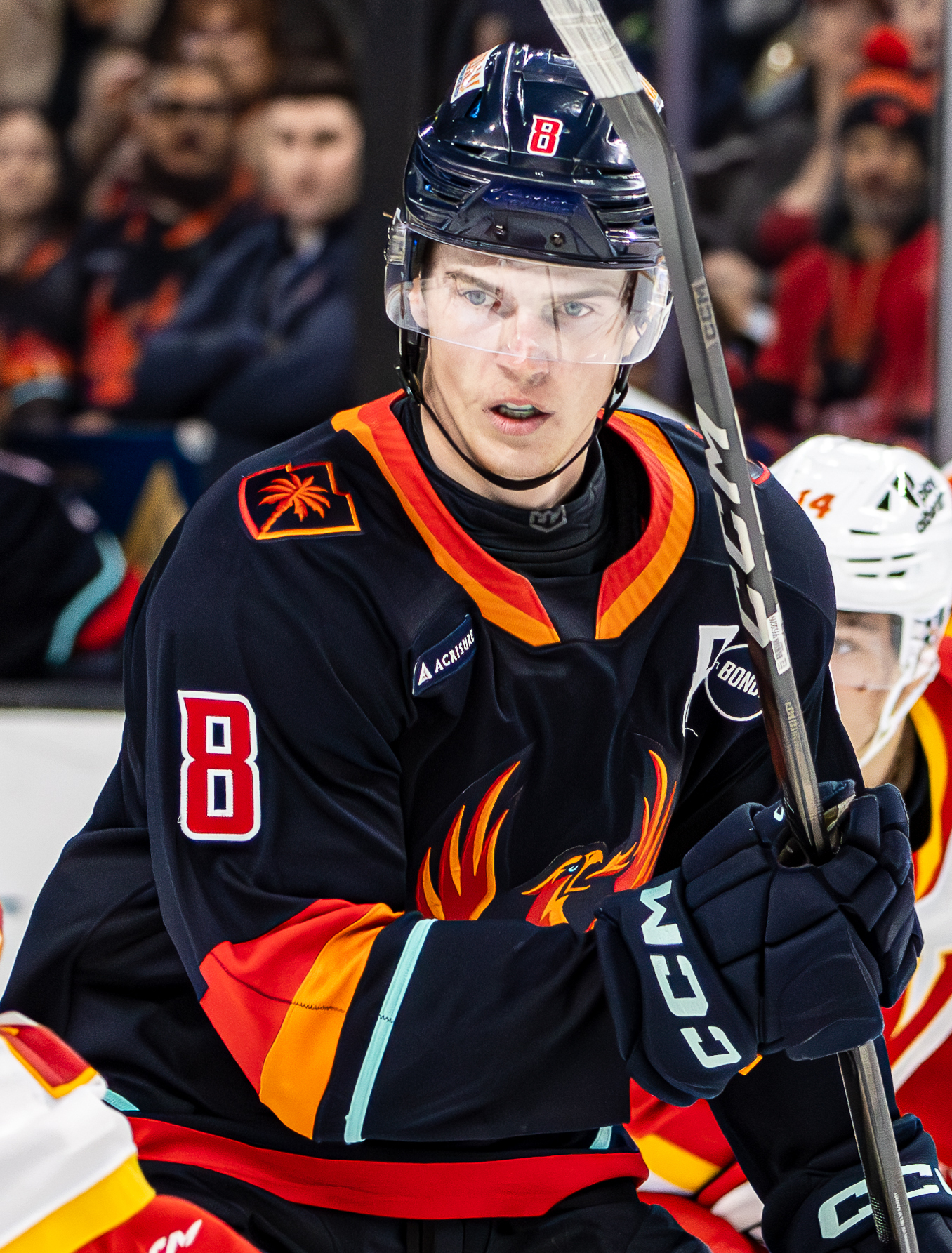
- Fleury with the Coachella Valley Firebirds in 2025
- Born: November 19, 1998 (age 27) Carlyle, Saskatchewan, Canada
- Height: 6 ft 1 in (185 cm)
- Weight: 204 lb (93 kg; 14 st 8 lb)
- Position: Defence
- Shoots: Right
- NHL team Former teams: Seattle Kraken; Montreal Canadiens
- NHL draft: 87th overall, 2017; Montreal Canadiens
- Playing career: 2018–present

Cale Fleury (born November 19, 1998) is a Canadian professional ice hockey player who is a defenceman for the Seattle Kraken of the National Hockey League (NHL). He was selected in the third round, 87th overall, by the Montreal Canadiens in the 2017 NHL entry draft.

Growing up in Carlyle, Saskatchewan, Fleury grew up playing minor hockey in the area before playing major junior hockey with the Kootenay Ice of the Western Hockey League. In 2017, he was drafted by the Canadiens, and in 2018, after four years with the Ice, he turned pro, joining the Laval Rocket, the AHL affiliate of the Canadiens. Fleury made his NHL debut in 2019, and he continued to play with the Canadiens and the Rocket until he was selected from the Canadiens in the 2021 NHL expansion draft by the Seattle Kraken. Since then, Fleury has played for the Kraken and their AHL affiliate, the Coachella Valley Firebirds.

== Playing career ==
=== Junior ===
Fleury was drafted in the fourth round, 78th overall, by the Kootenay Ice of the Western Hockey League (WHL) in the 2013 WHL bantam draft. Fleury played his first campaign with the Ice during the 2014–15 season, putting up one goal and 13 points through 70 games. On January 12, 2016, He was named alternate captain of the Ice. During the 2015–16 season, he tallied eight goals and 17 assists in 61 games.

On January 17, 2017, Fleury was named captain of the Ice, in part due to the trade of alternate captains Zak Zborosky and Matt Alfaro the week before. On January 28, he was named to Team Cherry for the 2017 CHL/NHL Top Prospects Game after an injury was sustained to Seattle Thunderbirds defenceman Jarret Tyszka. Team Cherry won the game 7–5 over Team Orr, and Fleury recorded three shots but no points. Fleury finished the 2016–17 season with 11 goals and 27 assists through 70 games. His work caused him to be ranked 62nd overall among North American skaters in the final NHL Bureau of Central Scouting ranking.

Fleury was selected 87th overall by the Montreal Canadiens in the 2017 NHL entry draft on July 24, 2017. On November 11, he was traded to the Regina Pats in exchange for defenceman Jonathan Smart and forward Cole Muir, as well as other WHL bantam draft picks. In 17 games before being traded, Fleury had achieved six goals and four assists. With the Pats, he notched six goals and 35 assists through 51 games. In seven playoff games, he tallied four assists. He helped the Pats reach the 2018 Memorial Cup, where he recorded one assist. However, the Pats lost the Memorial Cup Final 3–0 to the Acadie–Bathurst Titan.

=== Professional ===
==== Montreal Canadiens ====
Fleury was a participant in the Canadiens' 2018 training camp, and on October 4, 2018, he signed a three-year entry-level contract with the team. He then joined the Canadiens' American Hockey League (AHL) affiliate, the Laval Rocket, and he made the team's opening night roster. Fleury played 60 games with the Rocket during the 2018–19 season, ending with nine goals and 14 assists.

On October 1, 2019, it was announced that Fleury would appear in the Canadiens' opening night roster for the 2019–20 season. He made his NHL debut on October 3 against the Carolina Hurricanes, for whom his brother Haydn played at the time. On November 16, 2019, he scored his first NHL goal during a 4–3 overtime loss to the New Jersey Devils. On January 21, 2020, Fleury was assigned to the Rocket. His one goal was the only point he collected through 41 games that season with the Canadiens. Through 14 games with the Rocket, he put up two goals and three assists. To start the 2020–21 season, Fleury was named to the Canadiens' taxi squad, taxi squads being a safety measure put in place by the NHL for that season due to the COVID-19 pandemic. However, Fleury spent much of his time during the season with Laval, totaling six assists in 22 games.

==== Seattle Kraken ====
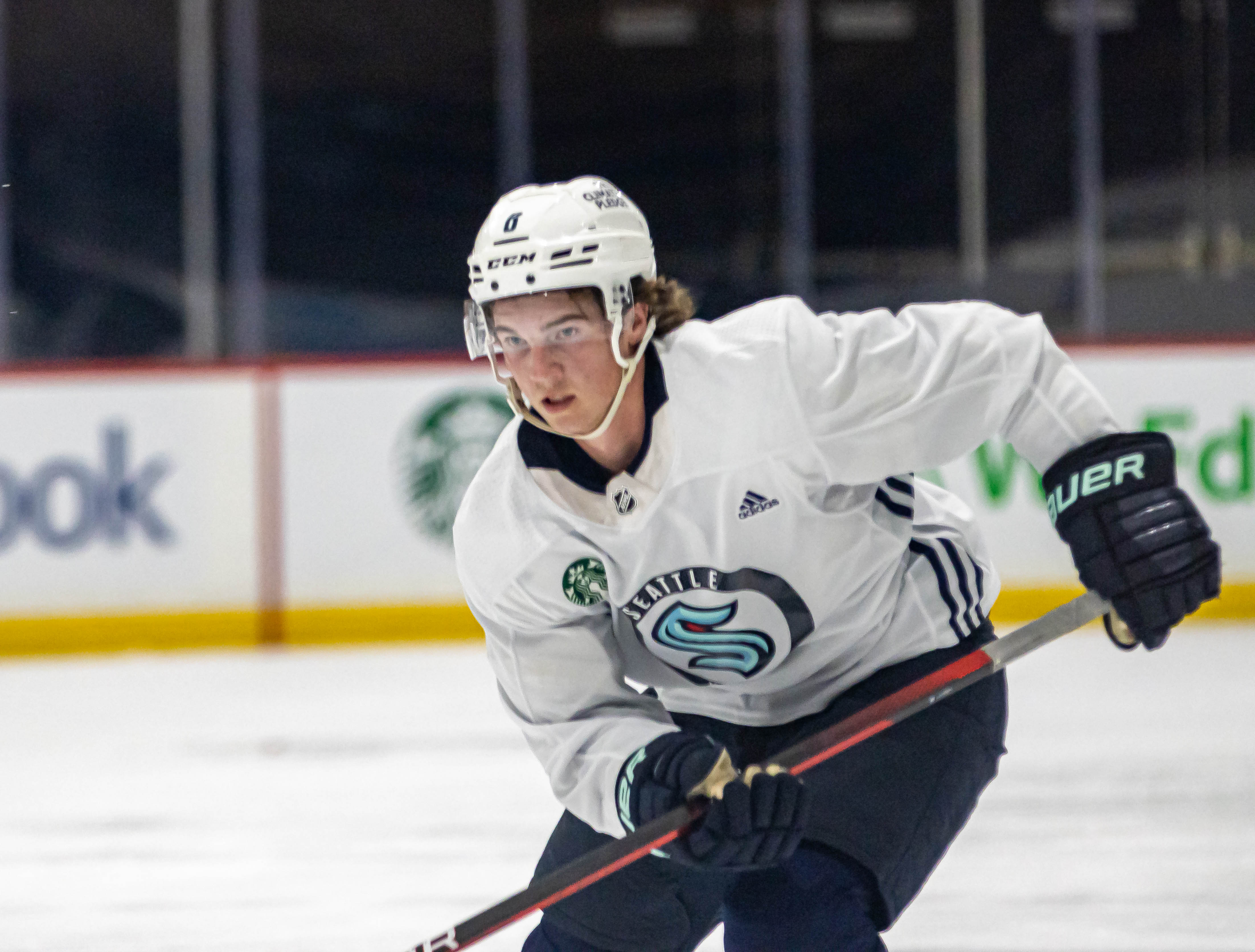
Fleury during the Kraken's 2022 training camp

On July 18, 2021, the protected player lists for the 2021 NHL expansion draft were released, which did not include Fleury. On July 21, he was selected from the Canadiens at the draft by the Seattle Kraken, reuniting him with his brother Haydn. On August 13, the Kraken signed him to a one-year, entry-level contract. Fleury was sent down to the Kraken's AHL affiliate, the Charlotte Checkers, of whom he was named an assistant captain. On January 24, 2022, after playing 36 games with Charlotte, he was recalled to the Kraken's taxi squad. He made his Kraken debut on February 1 against the Boston Bruins, playing on the same defensive pairing as his brother. Fleury was sent back down to the Checkers on February 3 after totaling two games with the Kraken. He was once again recalled by the Kraken on April 5, after collecting seven goals and 26 assists in 58 games with the Checkers. On April 28, after playing seven more games with the Kraken, he was returned to the Checkers. During the 2022 Calder Cup playoffs with the Checkers, Fleury notched three assists.

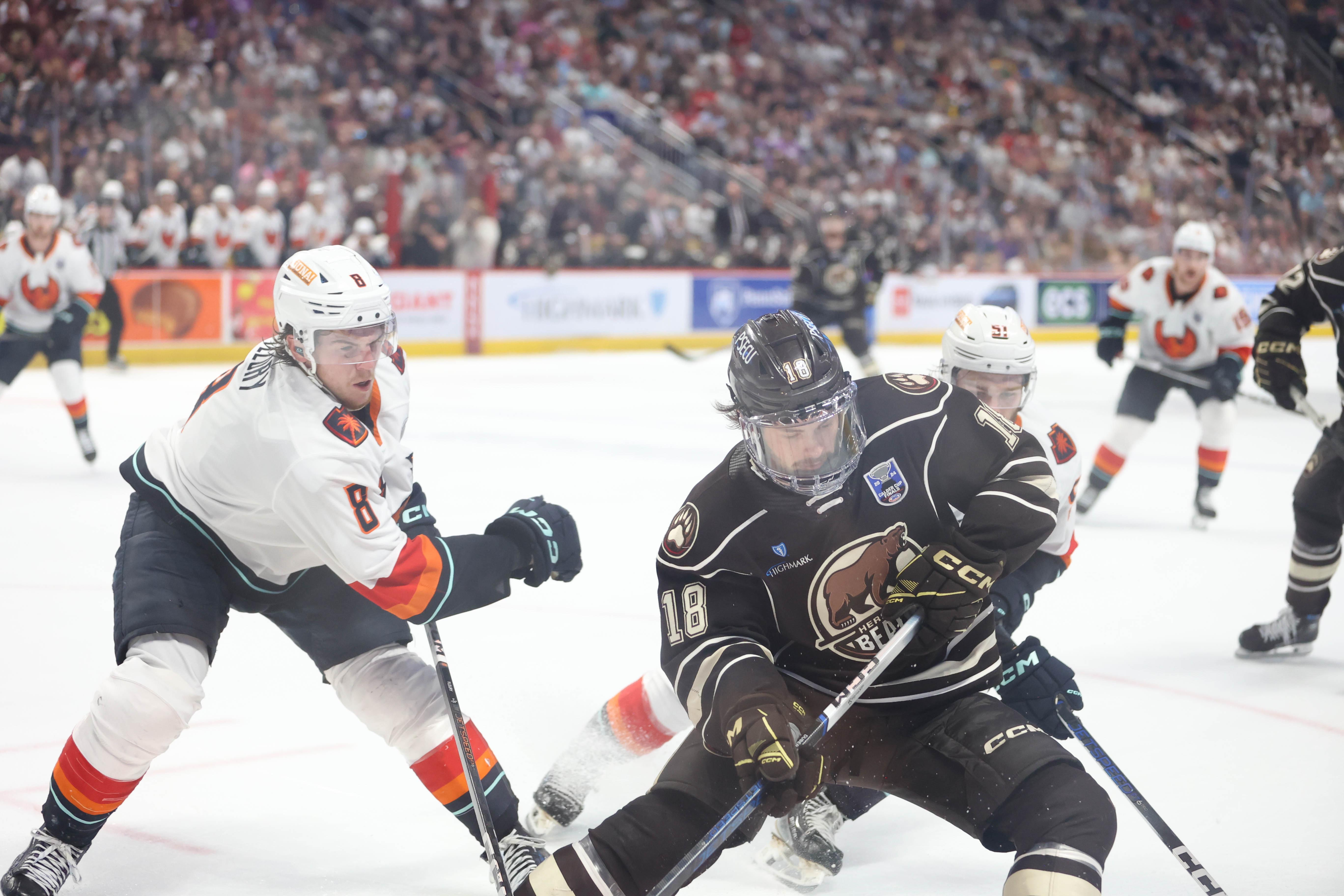
Fleury (left) with the Firebirds during the 2024 Calder Cup Final

During the 2022–23 season, Fleury played in 12 games with the Kraken, registering one assist. On July 9, 2023, He signed a two-year, US$1,600,000 contract with the Kraken. For the 2023–24 season, he was named to the opening roster of the Coachella Valley Firebirds, the Kraken's new AHL affiliate. Through 65 games with the Firebirds that season, Fleury tallied seven goals and 29 assists. He played one game with the Kraken that season on April 5, 2024, taking the place of Adam Larsson and registering 13:30 of ice time. During the Firebirds' run during the 2024 Calder Cup playoffs, which took them to the Calder Cup Final, Fleury registered five goals and nine assists in 18 games.

On October 18, 2024, Fleury recorded his first professional hat-trick as part of a 6–5 victory over the San Diego Gulls. On January 8, 2025, he was named to participate in the 2025 AHL All-Star Classic. However, on January 30, he was called up by the Kraken. This made him unable to participate in the All-Star Classic, and his roster spot was given to teammate Jani Nyman. Fleury ended the 2024–25 season with the Firebirds earning seven goals and 19 assists in 39 games. Through 14 games with the Kraken that season, he had only one assist. On June 20, Fleury signed a two-year contract extension with the Kraken, worth US$890,000 per year.

== Personal life ==
Fleury was born in Carlyle, Saskatchewan, to parents John and Sandra. Both John and Sandra's father and uncles played hockey in Carlyle as part of the Big Six Hockey League. Fleury and his brother Haydn grew up playing minor hockey in Carlyle until the family moved to Calgary in 2002.

Haydn Fleury's selection in the 2021 NHL expansion draft marked the first time brothers had been selected by the same team in the same draft. Haydn himself had been drafted 7th overall in the 2014 NHL entry draft by the Carolina Hurricanes.

== Career statistics ==
			Regular season					Playoffs
Season	Team	League	GP	G	A	Pts	PIM	GP	G	A	Pts	PIM
2014–15	Kootenay Ice	WHL	70	1	12	13	8	7	0	1	1	0
2015–16	Kootenay Ice	WHL	61	8	17	25	45	—	—	—	—	—
2016–17	Kootenay Ice	WHL	70	11	27	38	67	—	—	—	—	—
2017–18	Kootenay Ice	WHL	17	6	4	10	17	—	—	—	—	—
2017–18	Regina Pats	WHL	51	6	35	41	41	7	0	4	4	4
2018–19	Laval Rocket	AHL	60	9	14	23	23	—	—	—	—	—
2019–20	Montreal Canadiens	NHL	41	1	0	1	6	—	—	—	—	—
2019–20	Laval Rocket	AHL	14	2	3	5	4	—	—	—	—	—
2020–21	Laval Rocket	AHL	22	0	6	6	2	—	—	—	—	—
2021–22	Charlotte Checkers	AHL	58	7	26	33	39	7	0	3	3	24
2021–22	Seattle Kraken	NHL	9	0	0	0	0	—	—	—	—	—
2022–23	Seattle Kraken	NHL	12	0	1	1	2	—	—	—	—	—
2023–24	Coachella Valley Firebirds	AHL	65	7	29	36	20	18	5	9	14	8
2023–24	Seattle Kraken	NHL	1	0	0	0	0	—	—	—	—	—
2024–25	Coachella Valley Firebirds	AHL	39	7	19	26	11	3	0	0	0	2
2024–25	Seattle Kraken	NHL	14	0	1	1	0	—	—	—	—	—
2025–26	Seattle Kraken	NHL	23	1	2	3	7	—	—	—	—	—
NHL totals			100	2	4	6	15	—	—	—	—	—
