= Mike Green (ice hockey, born 1979) =

Canadian ice hockey player

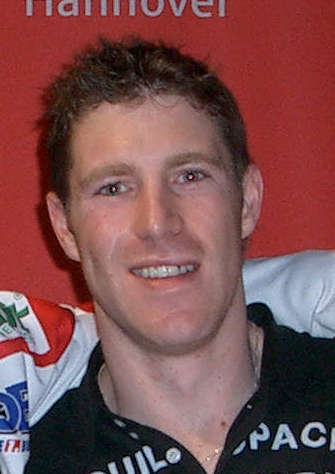
- Born: October 23, 1979 (age 46) Victoria, British Columbia, Canada
- Height: 5 ft 11 in (180 cm)
- Weight: 195 lb (88 kg; 13 st 13 lb)
- Position: Centre
- Shot: Right
- Played for: Florida Panthers; New York Rangers; Nürnberg Ice Tigers; Hannover Scorpions; Grizzly Adams Wolfsburg
- NHL draft: Undrafted
- Playing career: 2000–2010

Michael A. Green (born October 23, 1979, British Columbia) is a Canadian former professional ice hockey player. He is currently a scout for the Vancouver Giants of the Western Hockey League.

== Career ==
During the 2003–04 season Green played 24 games in the National Hockey League (NHL) with the Florida Panthers and New York Rangers, scoring one goal and three assists, and collecting four penalty minutes.

Green moved to Germany in 2004, signing with the Nürnberg Ice Tigers and then joining the Hannover Scorpions the next season before returning to the United States to play in the American Hockey League with the Iowa Stars. He rejoined the Hannover Scorpions for the 2007–08 season. He last played for the Grizzly Adams Wolfsburg in the 2009–10 season.

== Career statistics ==
=== Regular season and playoffs ===
			Regular season					Playoffs
Season	Team	League	GP	G	A	Pts	PIM	GP	G	A	Pts	PIM
1996–97	Calgary Northstars U18	AMHL	35	34	27	61	78	—	—	—	—	—
1996–97	Edmonton Ice	WHL	7	0	2	2	0	—	—	—	—	—
1997–98	Edmonton Ice	WHL	71	15	26	41	16	—	—	—	—	—
1998–99	Kootenay Ice	WHL	71	35	45	80	37	7	2	2	4	4
1999–00	Kootenay Ice	WHL	69	43	49	92	63	21	9	16	25	20
1999–00	Kootenay Ice	M-Cup	—	—	—	—	—	3	0	0	0	6
2000–01	Port Huron Border Cats	UHL	11	1	5	6	6	—	—	—	—	—
2000–01	Knoxville Speed	UHL	48	18	24	42	35	1	0	0	0	0
2000–01	Louisville Panthers	AHL	25	2	1	3	4	—	—	—	—	—
2001–02	Macon Whoopee	ECHL	54	27	35	62	18	—	—	—	—	—
2001–02	Cincinnati Mighty Ducks	AHL	22	2	9	11	4	3	0	0	0	0
2002–03	San Antonio Rampage	AHL	80	26	34	60	25	3	0	2	2	0
2003–04	Florida Panthers	NHL	11	0	1	1	2	—	—	—	—	—
2003–04	San Antonio Rampage	AHL	45	12	23	35	16	—	—	—	—	—
2003–04	New York Rangers	NHL	13	1	2	3	2	—	—	—	—	—
2004–05	Nürnberg Ice Tigers	DEL	44	11	17	28	38	6	1	3	4	0
2005–06	Hannover Scorpions	DEL	50	17	26	43	122	9	3	0	3	14
2006–07	Iowa Stars	AHL	23	8	9	17	16	—	—	—	—	—
2006–07	Hershey Bears	AHL	12	3	5	8	26	19	7	9	16	38
2007–08	Hannover Scorpions	DEL	45	11	15	26	20	3	0	1	1	0
2008–09	Grizzly Adams Wolfsburg	DEL	52	12	29	41	50	10	1	4	5	2
2009–10	Grizzly Adams Wolfsburg	DEL	48	15	20	35	12	7	0	3	3	2
AHL totals			206	53	81	134	91	25	7	11	18	38
DEL totals			239	66	107	173	242	35	5	11	16	18
NHL totals			24	1	3	4	4	—	—	—	—	—

== Awards and honours ==
Award	Year
WHL East Second Team All-Star	1999–00
