= KAPL-FM =

- Rock Island, Washington; United States
- Broadcast area: Wenatchee, Washington
- Frequency: 99.5 MHz
- Branding: 99.5 The Apple

Programming
- Format: Adult contemporary

Ownership
- Owner: Townsquare Media; (Townsquare License, LLC)
- Sister stations: KKWN, KPQ, KPQ-FM, KWNC, KWWW-FM, KYSN, KYSP

History
- First air date: June 24, 1988; 37 years ago (as KXAA)
- Former call signs: KXAA (1988–2000); KAAP (2000–2016); KQBG (2016–2023)
- Call sign meaning: "Apple"

Technical information
- Licensing authority: FCC
- Facility ID: 63882
- Class: A
- ERP: 5,300 watts
- HAAT: −25 meters (−82 ft)
- Transmitter coordinates: 47°22′52.00″N 120°17′15.00″W

Links
- Public license information: Public file; LMS
- Webcast: Listen Live
- Website: 995theapple.com

KAPL-FM (99.5 MHz, "99.5 The Apple") is a radio station broadcasting an adult contemporary format. Licensed to Rock Island, Washington, United States, the station serves the Wenatchee area. It is currently owned by Townsquare Media and licensed to Townsquare License, LLC.

== History ==
The station went on the air as KXAA on June 24, 1988. On February 1, 2000, it changed its call sign to KAAP.

On May 6, 2016, at noon, KAAP changed its format from adult contemporary to hot adult contemporary, branded as "99.5 The Bridge". The first song on The Bridge was "SexyBack" by Justin Timberlake. The station also changed its call sign from KAAP to KQBG.

On April 10, 2023, KQBG changed its format from hot adult contemporary to adult contemporary, branded as "99.5 The Apple". The station changed its call sign to KAPL-FM on May 1, 2023.

== Ownership ==
In June 2006, a deal was reached for KAAP to be acquired by Cherry Creek Media from Fisher Radio Regional Group as part of a 24-station deal with a total reported sale price of $33.3 million.

Effective June 17, 2022, Cherry Creek Radio sold KQBG as part of a 42 station/21 translator package to Townsquare Media for $18.75 million.
