= KWWW-FM =

Contemporary hit radio station in Quincy, Washington

- Quincy, Washington; United States
- Broadcast area: Chelan County
- Frequency: 96.7 MHz
- Branding: 96.7/103.9 KW3

Programming
- Language: English
- Format: Contemporary hit radio
- Affiliations: Compass Media Networks; Premiere Networks

Ownership
- Owner: Townsquare Media; (Townsquare License, LLC)
- Sister stations: KAPL-FM; KKWN; KPQ; KPQ-FM; KWNC; KYSN; KYSP

History
- First air date: 1985
- Former call signs: KLLH (1983–1985, CP)

Technical information
- Licensing authority: FCC
- Facility ID: 59050
- Class: A
- ERP: 440 watts
- HAAT: 315 meters (1,033 ft)
- Transmitter coordinates: 47°19′12.4″N 119°48′4.1″W
- Repeaters: 95.3 K237AW (Chelan); 103.9 K280BZ (Wenatchee)

Links
- Public license information: Public file; LMS
- Webcast: Listen live
- Website: kw3.com

KWWW-FM (96.7 FM, "KW3") is a radio station broadcasting a contemporary hit radio music format. The station went on the air in 1985, built by Jim Corcoran, who owned KWWW in Wenatchee. Licensed to Quincy, Washington, United States, the station is currently owned by Townsquare Media.
