= Jaroslav Obšut =

Slovak former ice hockey player (born 1976)

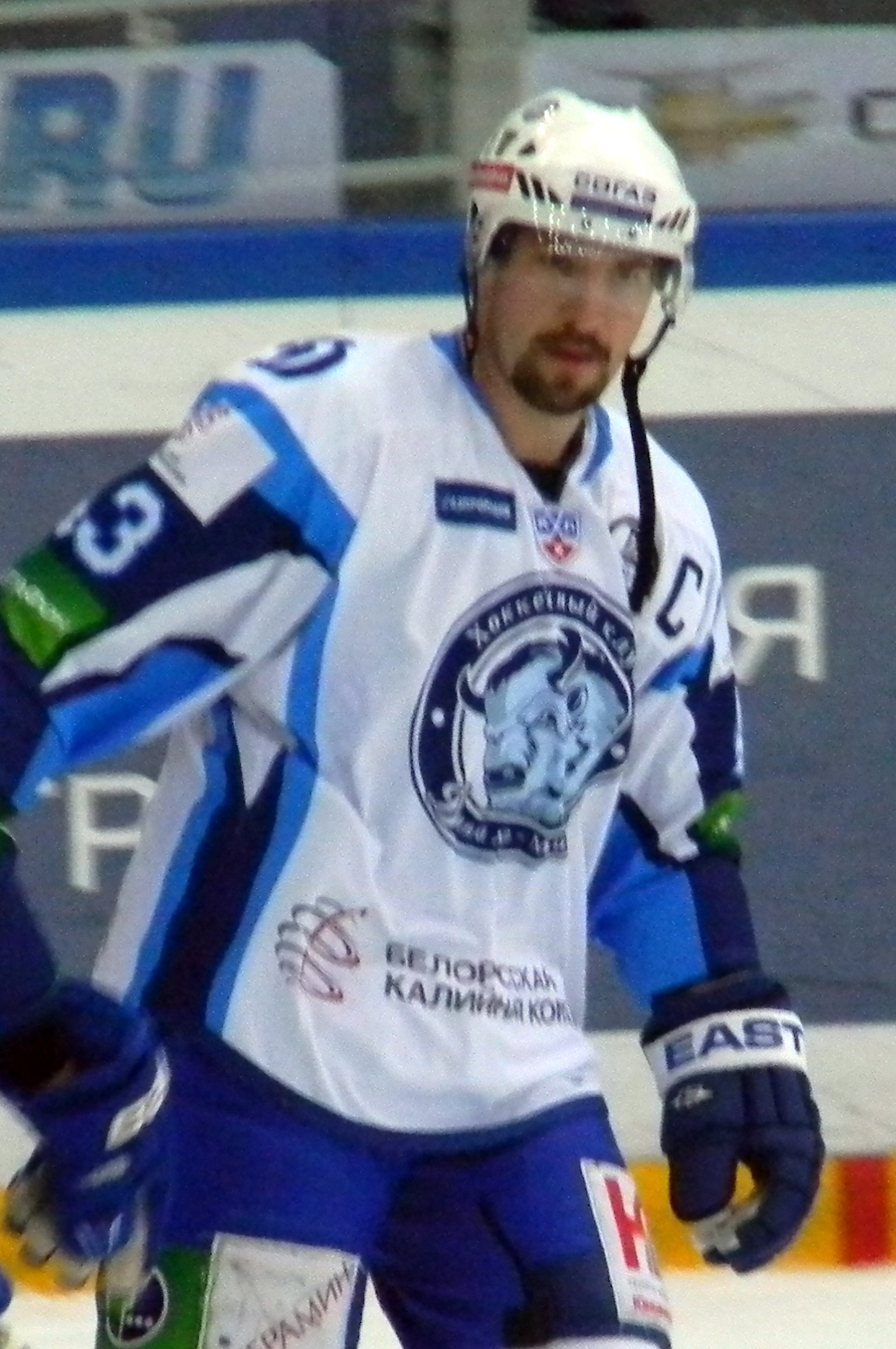
- Born: September 3, 1976 (age 49) Prešov, Czechoslovakia
- Height: 6 ft 0 in (183 cm)
- Weight: 201 lb (91 kg; 14 st 5 lb)
- Position: Defenceman
- Shot: Left
- Played for: St. Louis Blues; Colorado Avalanche; Luleå HF; HC Spartak Moscow; Atlant Moscow Oblast; HC Dinamo Minsk; HC Donbass; HKm Zvolen; Corona Wolves Brasov; HK Dukla Trenčín
- National team: Slovakia
- NHL draft: 188th overall, 1995; Winnipeg Jets
- Playing career: 1997–2018

Jaroslav Obšut (born September 3, 1976) is a Slovak former ice hockey player. He last played for HC Bratislava of the Slovak 1.Liga. Obsut is of German and Slovak descent.

== Playing career ==
Obšut was drafted to the National Hockey League (NHL) in 1995 by the Winnipeg Jets in the eighth round, 188th overall. Obšut played seven games in the NHL, four for the St. Louis Blues and three for the Colorado Avalanche. After playing with Luleå in the Swedish Elitserien for five seasons, Jaroslav signed a two-year contract with HC Spartak Moscow of the Kontinental Hockey League on May 27, 2009. During his second year with Spartak, Obsut was released to play with league rival, HK Atlant, on November 26, 2010.

On May 27, 2011, Obsut signed a one-year contract with fellow KHL team, Dynamo Minsk, for the 2011–12 season.

== Career statistics ==
=== Regular season and playoffs ===
			Regular season					Playoffs
Season	Team	League	GP	G	A	Pts	PIM	GP	G	A	Pts	PIM
1994–95	North Battleford North Stars	SJHL	55	21	30	51	126	—	—	—	—	—
1995–96	Swift Current Broncos	WHL	72	10	11	21	57	6	0	0	0	2
1996–97	Edmonton Ice	WHL	13	2	9	11	4	—	—	—	—	—
1996–97	Medicine Hat Tigers	WHL	50	8	26	34	42	4	0	2	2	2
1996–97	Toledo Storm	ECHL	3	1	0	1	0	5	0	1	1	6
1997–98	Raleigh Icecaps	ECHL	60	6	26	32	46	—	—	—	—	—
1997–98	Syracuse Crunch	AHL	4	0	1	1	4	—	—	—	—	—
1998–99	Augusta Lynx	ECHL	41	11	25	36	42	—	—	—	—	—
1998–99	Manitoba Moose	IHL	2	0	0	0	0	—	—	—	—	—
1998–99	Worcester IceCats	AHL	31	2	8	10	14	4	0	1	1	2
1999–2000	Worcester IceCats	AHL	7	0	2	2	4	—	—	—	—	—
2000–01	Peoria Rivermen	ECHL	3	0	4	4	2	—	—	—	—	—
2000–01	Worcester IceCats	AHL	47	9	12	21	20	7	0	1	1	4
2000–01	St. Louis Blues	NHL	4	0	0	0	2	—	—	—	—	—
2001–02	Hershey Bears	AHL	58	3	22	25	48	8	0	2	2	2
2001–02	Colorado Avalanche	NHL	3	0	0	0	0	—	—	—	—	—
2002–03	Manitoba Moose	AHL	60	6	13	19	59	14	0	4	4	8
2003–04	Manitoba Moose	AHL	65	11	26	37	42	—	—	—	—	—
2004–05	Luleå HF	SEL	49	11	19	30	50	2	0	0	0	50
2005–06	Luleå HF	SEL	48	8	17	25	40	6	0	1	1	6
2006–07	Luleå HF	SEL	51	11	21	32	26	4	0	0	0	4
2007–08	Luleå HF	SEL	52	5	11	16	78	—	—	—	—	—
2008–09	Luleå HF	SEL	54	8	21	29	48	5	2	2	4	10
2009–10	Spartak Moscow	KHL	50	9	14	23	88	6	1	2	3	2
2010–11	Spartak Moscow	KHL	23	2	5	7	26	—	—	—	—	—
2010–11	Atlant Moscow Oblast	KHL	27	2	8	10	12	24	5	5	10	8
2011–12	Dinamo Minsk	KHL	52	5	24	29	22	4	0	0	0	0
2012–13	HC Donbass	KHL	23	1	4	5	12	—	—	—	—	—
2012–13	Spartak Moscow	KHL	16	3	4	7	14	—	—	—	—	—
2012–13	HKm Zvolen	SVK	7	1	1	2	39	—	—	—	—	—
2013–14	HKm Zvolen	SVK	24	6	9	15	41	—	—	—	—	—
2014–15	Corona Wolves Brasov	MOL	38	10	20	30	42	6	0	1	1	20
2014–15	Corona Wolves Brasov	ROU	6	4	4	8	4	8	3	4	7	4
2015–16	HC Prešov 07	SVK.2	31	7	27	34	69	4	1	3	4	0
2016–17	HK Dukla Trenčín	SVK	15	0	1	1	2	—	—	—	—	—
2016–17	HC Prešov 07	SVK.2	10	2	5	7	6	4	0	3	3	0
2017–18	HC Bratislava	SVK.2	36	4	13	17	47	4	1	2	3	4
NHL totals			7	0	0	0	2	—	—	—	—	—
SHL totals			254	43	89	132	242	17	2	3	5	70
KHL totals			191	22	59	81	174	34	6	7	13	10

=== International ===
Year	Team	Event	Result	GP	G	A	Pts	PIM
2002	Slovakia	OG	13th	4	0	0	0	2
2004	Slovakia	WCH	7th	3	0	0	0	0
2005	Slovakia	WC	5th	4	0	0	0	2
2009	Slovakia	WC	10th	6	0	1	1	0
Senior totals				17	0	1	1	4
