= KWNC =

Simulcasting KKWN Cashmere
- Quincy, Washington; United States
- Frequency: 1370 kHz
- Branding: Talk 106.7

Programming
- Format: Talk
- Affiliations: Fox News Radio; Compass Media Networks; Premiere Networks; Radio America; Salem Radio Network; Westwood One

Ownership
- Owner: Townsquare Media; (Townsquare License, LLC)
- Sister stations: KAPL-FM, KKWN, KPQ, KPQ-FM, KWWW-FM, KYSN, KYSP

History
- First air date: 1958 (as KPOR)
- Former call signs: KPOR (1958-?)
- Call sign meaning: "Quincy"

Technical information
- Licensing authority: FCC
- Facility ID: 29647
- Class: D
- Power: 1,000 watts day 39 watts night
- Transmitter coordinates: 47°17′29.5″N 119°51′14.2″W

Links
- Public license information: Public file; LMS
- Webcast: Listen Live
- Website: talk1067.com

KWNC (1370 AM) is a radio station broadcasting a talk format, simulcasting KKWN 106.7 FM Cashmere. Licensed to Quincy, Washington, United States, the station is currently owned by Townsquare Media, through licensee Townsquare License, LLC.

The station came on the air in 1958 as KPOR, 1,000 watts, daytime only, licensed to Donald R. Nelson, and utilized an aluminum tower and a Collins 20V-1 transmitter. Nelson, and his wife Ann, operated the station for over ten years from a building which formerly contained a bank. With the door welded permanently open, the station used the abandoned bank vault for a news room. KPOR serviced Quincy and the surrounding farming community with a country music format. During program testing prior to officially going on the air, a crop dusting airplane crashed into the tower's guy wires. The tower crashed to the ground and, with some of the guy wires dangling from its wings, the plane made it safely back to its airport at Wenatchee, Washington.
