= Jeremy Yablonski =

Canadian ice hockey player (born 1980)

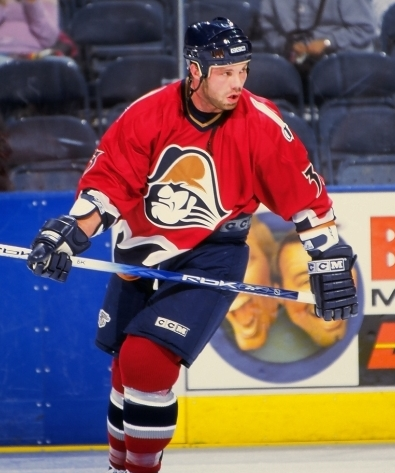
- Yablonski with the Milwaukee Admirals during the 2004-05 season
- Born: March 21, 1980 (age 46) Meadow Lake, Saskatchewan, Canada
- Height: 6 ft 1 in (185 cm)
- Weight: 245 lb (111 kg; 17 st 7 lb)
- Position: Right wing
- Shot: Right
- Played for: St. Louis Blues
- NHL draft: Undrafted
- Playing career: 2000–2021

Jeremy Yablonski (born March 21, 1980) is a Canadian former professional ice hockey right winger. Primarily a hockey enforcer, Yablonski is also a former novice boxing champion and mixed martial arts heavy weight fighter.

== Playing career ==
An undrafted player, Yablonski began his pro career in 2000–01 in the West Coast Hockey League. He played his first and only NHL game for the St. Louis Blues in 2003, and received a five-minute major for fighting Todd Fedoruk. From there, Yablonski continued a 15-year career in professional hockey as an enforcer in the AHL, ECHL, and KHL. Yablonski won the Calder Cup in the AHL and the Kelly Cup in the ECHL.

Yablonski fought in his first professional mixed martial arts competition on May 12, 2007, at XFS (Extreme Fight Series) 5, knocking his opponent out in 19 seconds of the first round. Yablonski improved in XFS-6 on June 14, 2007 by knocking his opponent out in 17 seconds of the first round. Jeremy Yablonski confirmed his signing with Vityaz Chekhov on July 24, 2011.

In 2013, he expressed interest in gaining first Polish, and then Ukrainian dual-citizenship in order to play for the Ukrainian national hockey team.

On December 31, 2021, Yablonski came out of retirement and signed with the Idaho Steelheads of the ECHL. He once again came out retirement to play one more game with the Steelheads on December 31, 2023, at the age of 43.

== Career statistics ==
			Regular season					Playoffs
Season	Team	League	GP	G	A	Pts	PIM	GP	G	A	Pts	PIM
1996–97	Beardy's Blackhawks	SMHL	38	7	3	10	284	—	—	—	—	—
1997–98	Edmonton Ice	WHL	47	3	0	3	143	—	—	—	—	—
1998–99	Kootenay Ice	WHL	27	1	1	2	77	—	—	—	—	—
1999–00	Kootenay Ice	WHL	—	—	—	—	—	—	—	—	—	—
2000–01	Phoenix Mustangs	WCHL	44	2	1	3	169	—	—	—	—	—
2001–02	Idaho Steelheads	WCHL	69	2	1	3	303	—	—	—	—	—
2002–03	Peoria Rivermen	ECHL	24	1	2	3	154	—	—	—	—	—
2002–03	Cincinnati Mighty Ducks	AHL	9	0	0	0	42	—	—	—	—	—
2002–03	Worcester IceCats	AHL	20	1	0	1	50	1	0	0	0	2
2003–04	Worcester IceCats	AHL	6	0	0	0	19	—	—	—	—	—
2003–04	Peoria Rivermen	ECHL	13	0	2	2	62	—	—	—	—	—
2003–04	St. Louis Blues	NHL	1	0	0	0	5	—	—	—	—	—
2003–04	Milwaukee Admirals	AHL	2	0	0	0	11	—	—	—	—	—
2004–05	Milwaukee Admirals	AHL	32	3	2	5	116	—	—	—	—	—
2005–06	Milwaukee Admirals	AHL	30	0	1	1	82	—	—	—	—	—
2005–06	Idaho Steelheads	ECHL	3	0	1	1	25	—	—	—	—	—
2006–07	Idaho Steelheads	ECHL	41	3	3	6	163	—	—	—	—	—
2007–08	Binghamton Senators	AHL	76	3	10	13	228	—	—	—	—	—
2008–09	Binghamton Senators	AHL	64	1	2	3	215	—	—	—	—	—
2009–10	Binghamton Senators	AHL	27	1	0	1	128	—	—	—	—	—
2010–11	Bridgeport Sound Tigers	AHL	17	0	2	2	48	—	—	—	—	—
2011–12	Vityaz Chekhov	KHL	16	0	0	0	174	—	—	—	—	—
2012–13	Vityaz Chekhov	KHL	8	0	0	0	16	—	—	—	—	—
2013–14	Idaho Steelheads	ECHL	8	1	0	1	35	—	—	—	—	—
2013–14	Ontario Reign	ECHL	10	0	1	1	30	2	1	0	1	2
2014–15	Ontario Reign	ECHL	8	0	0	0	13	—	—	—	—	—
2021–22	Idaho Steelheads	ECHL	1	0	0	0	0	—	—	—	—	—
2023–24	Idaho Steelheads	ECHL	1	0	0	0	0	—	—	—	—	—
NHL totals			1	0	0	0	5	—	—	—	—	—
AHL totals			283	9	17	26	939	1	0	0	0	2
