= Ryan McGill =

Canadian ice hockey player & coach (born 1969)

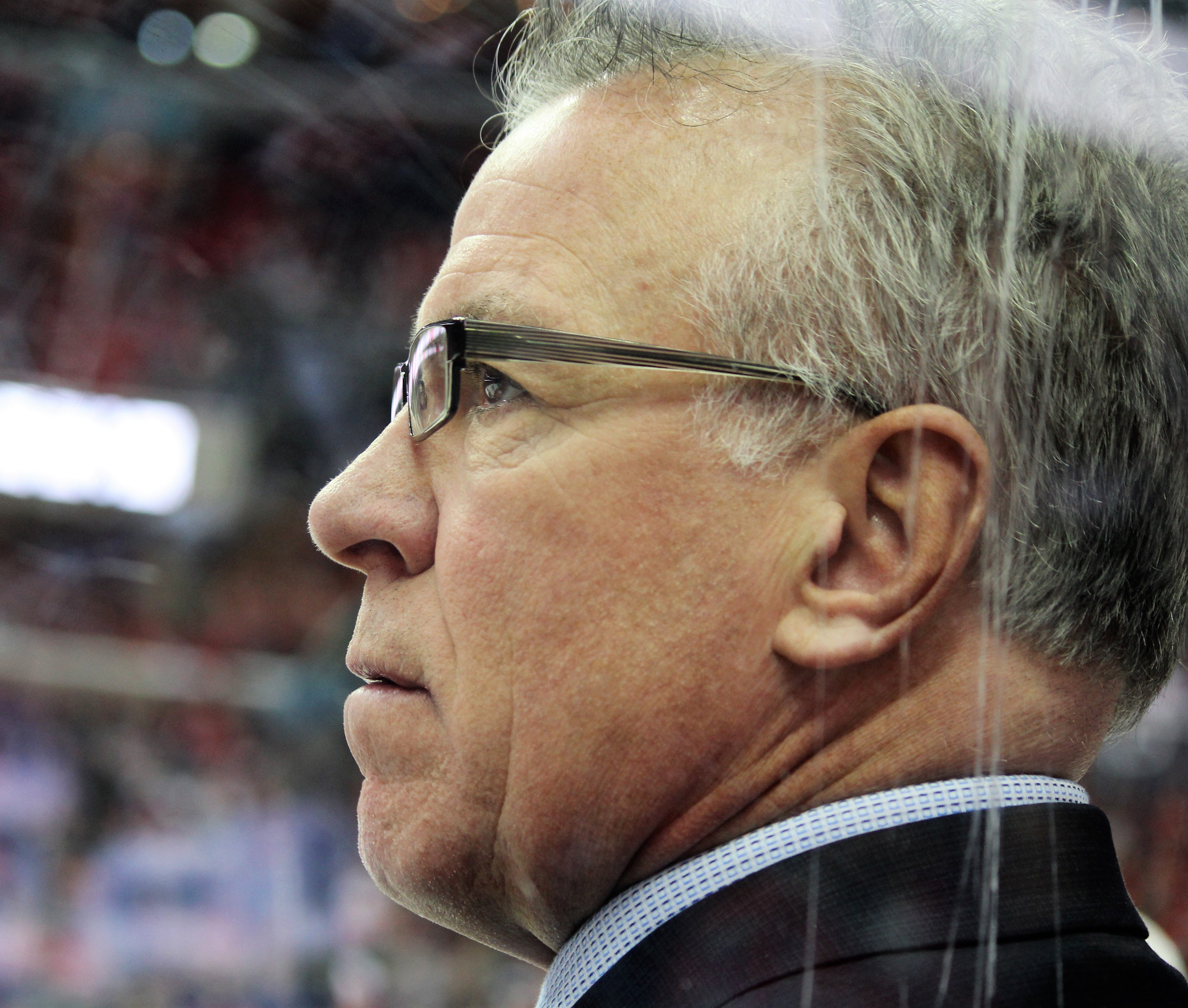
- McGill coaching the Vegas Golden Knights in 2018
- Born: February 28, 1969 (age 57) Sherwood Park, Alberta, Canada
- Height: 6 ft 2 in (188 cm)
- Weight: 197 lb (89 kg; 14 st 1 lb)
- Position: Defence
- Shot: Right
- Played for: Chicago Blackhawks; Philadelphia Flyers; Edmonton Oilers
- NHL draft: 29th overall, 1987; Chicago Blackhawks
- Playing career: 1989–1995

Ryan Clifford McGill (born February 28, 1969) is a Canadian professional ice hockey coach and former player. He is currently an assistant coach with the Anaheim Ducks of the National Hockey League (NHL). He played in the 151 games in the NHL with the Chicago Blackhawks, Philadelphia Flyers, and Edmonton Oilers between 1991 and 1995. McGill's playing career ended prematurely as a result of an eye injury.

== Playing career ==
McGill was born on February 28, 1969, in Sherwood Park, Alberta. A second-round draft choice of the Chicago Blackhawks in the 1987 NHL Draft, he played a total of 151 career NHL games over a seven-year career with the Blackhawks, Philadelphia Flyers and Edmonton Oilers. His professional playing career also included the American Hockey League and International Hockey League. As a player in the Blackhawks development system, he was a member of the 1990 Turner Cup Champions which was then coached by Darryl Sutter.

McGill's playing career ended after he was struck in the left eye by an errant puck in a game against the Mighty Ducks of Anaheim on April 5, 1995. Despite attempts to save the sight, he was declared legally blind in that eye and was forced to retire at the age of 26.

== Coaching career ==
McGill served as an assistant coach for the Edmonton Ice in the Western Hockey League during the 1996–97 season. When the team began the 1997–98 season with nine losses and one tie, head Dave Siciliano was fired on October 24, 1997, and replaced by McGill.

McGill coached 350 games in the Western Hockey League, capping it off by steering the Kootenay Ice to the 2001–02 Memorial Cup title, the championship of all Canadian Major Junior hockey.

He guided the Hartford Wolf Pack (New York Rangers AHL affiliate) team to the 2003–04 regular season Eastern Conference title, tying for first place overall with a 44–24–12–2 mark for 102 points. That year, his team fell short of a trip to the Calder Cup Finals, losing in the Eastern Conference Finals to the Wilkes-Barre/Scranton Penguins.

McGill joined the Calgary Flames as an assistant coach in June 2009 after four seasons as the head coach for the Flames' American Hockey League (AHL) primary affiliate team in Quad City and Omaha.

He was named head coach of the WHL's Kootenay Ice on July 4, 2012. On July 28, 2015, he was named head coach of the OHL's Owen Sound Attack. He was awarded the Matt Leyden Trophy as OHL Coach of the Year in April 2017. McGill stepped down as head coach in June 2017 to become an assistant head coach for the NHL expansion team, the Vegas Golden Knights.

On June 29, 2017, he was named an assistant coach with the Vegas Golden Knights. McGill and fellow assistant coach Steve Spott were let go by the Vegas Golden Knights in May 2022.

On July 29, 2022, McGill was named an assistant coach with the New Jersey Devils. On May 9, 2025, it was announced that McGill would not return to New Jersey.

On July 1, 2025, McGill was named an assistant coach with the Anaheim Ducks.

== Career statistics ==
=== Regular season and playoffs ===
			Regular season					Playoffs
Season	Team	League	GP	G	A	Pts	PIM	GP	G	A	Pts	PIM
1984–85	Sherwood Park Crusaders	AJHL	—	—	—	—	—	—	—	—	—	—
1985–86	Lethbridge Broncos	WHL	64	5	10	15	171	10	0	1	1	9
1986–87	Swift Current Broncos	WHL	72	12	36	48	226	4	1	0	1	9
1987–88	Medicine Hat Tigers	WHL	67	5	30	35	224	15	7	3	10	47
1987–88	Medicine Hat Tigers	M-Cup	—	—	—	—	—	5	1	0	1	13
1988–89	Medicine Hat Tigers	WHL	57	26	45	71	172	3	0	2	2	15
1988–89	Saginaw Hawks	IHL	8	2	0	2	12	6	0	0	0	42
1989–90	Indianapolis Ice	IHL	77	11	17	28	215	14	2	2	4	29
1990–91	Indianapolis Ice	IHL	63	11	40	51	200	—	—	—	—	—
1990–91	Halifax Citadels	AHL	7	0	4	4	6	—	—	—	—	—
1991–92	Chicago Blackhawks	NHL	9	0	2	2	20	—	—	—	—	—
1991–92	Indianapolis Ice	IHL	40	7	19	26	170	—	—	—	—	—
1991–92	Hershey Bears	AHL	17	3	5	8	67	6	1	1	2	4
1992–93	Philadelphia Flyers	NHL	72	3	10	13	238	—	—	—	—	—
1992–93	Hershey Bears	AHL	4	0	2	2	26	—	—	—	—	—
1993–94	Philadelphia Flyers	NHL	50	1	3	4	112	—	—	—	—	—
1994–95	Philadelphia Flyers	NHL	12	0	0	0	13	—	—	—	—	—
1994–95	Edmonton Oilers	NHL	8	0	0	0	8	—	—	—	—	—
IHL totals			188	31	76	107	597	20	2	2	4	71
NHL totals			151	4	15	19	391	—	—	—	—	—
