= Wenatchee Wild =

Western Hockey League team in Wenatchee, Washington

- City: Wenatchee, Washington
- League: Western Hockey League
- Conference: Western
- Division: U.S.
- Founded: 1996
- Home arena: Town Toyota Center
- Colors: Blue, black, and white
- Owner: David White
- General manager: Bliss Littler
- Head coach: Don Nachbaur
- Media: NewsRadio 560 KPQ
- Website: chl.ca/whl-wild

Franchise history
- 1996–1998: Edmonton Ice
- 1998–2019: Kootenay Ice
- 2019–2023: Winnipeg Ice
- 2023–present: Wenatchee Wild

Current uniform

The Wenatchee Wild are an American major junior ice hockey team based in Wenatchee, Washington, and playing in the Western Hockey League. Founded in 1996 as the Edmonton Ice, the franchise was known as the Winnipeg Ice from 2019 until 2023, when it was purchased and relocated to Wenatchee ahead of the 2023–24 season. The Wild play in the U.S. Division of the WHL's Western Conference, hosting games at the Town Toyota Center.

== History ==
The Wild franchise originated as the Edmonton Ice, a WHL expansion team added in 1996. After two years in Edmonton, the original Ice moved to Cranbrook, British Columbia—which would be one of the smallest cities in the league—and became the Kootenay Ice. After two decades in Cranbrook, which included three league championships and a Memorial Cup title, the team relocated to Winnipeg in 2019. However, with the Ice playing in the league's smallest venue on the University of Manitoba campus, and with promises for a new arena failing to materialize, the Ice were put up for sale in 2023, after a season that saw the team reach the league final.

David and Lisa White, who owned and operated the British Columbia Hockey League's Wenatchee Wild—a successful junior A club that in 2018 became the first American team to win the BCHL title in four decades—purchased the Ice with the intention of moving the team to Wenatchee. The Whites announced that the BCHL team would cease operations, with the Wild name and branding being adopted by the WHL team. The new team was added to the U.S. Division of the Western Conference of the WHL, alongside new in-state rivals, the Seattle Thunderbirds, Everett Silvertips, Spokane Chiefs, and Tri-City Americans, as well as the Portland Winterhawks.

On July 13, 2023, the team announced that Kevin Constantine—a former Silvertips and National Hockey League head coach—had been hired as the team's first coach. However, Constantine was suspended indefinitely by the WHL on September 25, only days into the team's inaugural season, pending an independent investigation into alleged violations of the league's regulations and policies. Constantine's contract was terminated by the club on October 5 and on October 12, 2023, the team announced that it had hired Roy Sommer, who holds the record for the most coaching wins in the American Hockey League, as its new coach.

The Wild's first regular season game took place on September 22, 2023, when they hosted the Portland Winterhawks. The Wild trailed 4–1 in the first period, but came back to win the game by a score of 6–5. The Wild went on to win 34 games and secured a playoff spot, facing off against the Kelowna Rockets in the first round. The Rockets prevailed in the series, eliminating Wenatchee in six games.

== Season-by-season record ==
Note: GP = Games played, W = Wins, L = Losses, OTL = Overtime losses, SOL = Shootout losses, GF = Goals for, GA = Goals against

Season	GP	W	L	OTL	SOL	GF	GA	Points	Finish	Playoffs
2023–24	68	34	30	4	0	249	268	72	3rd U.S.	Lost Western Conference quarterfinal
2024–25	68	23	36	8	1	207	253	55	6th U.S.	Did not qualify
2025–26	68	25	38	3	2	190	282	55	6th U.S.	Did not qualify
