= KYSN =

- East Wenatchee, Washington; United States
- Broadcast area: Wenatchee, Washington
- Frequency: 97.7 MHz
- Branding: Kissin' 97.7

Programming
- Format: Country
- Affiliations: Compass Media Networks

Ownership
- Owner: Townsquare Media; (Townsquare License, LLC)
- Sister stations: KAPL-FM, KKWN, KPQ, KPQ-FM, KWNC, KWWW-FM, KYSP

History
- First air date: 1980-12-02 (as KTRW)
- Former call signs: KTRW (1980–1984)

Technical information
- Licensing authority: FCC
- Facility ID: 63883
- Class: A
- ERP: 6,000 watts
- HAAT: -30 meters
- Transmitter coordinates: 47°22′51.00″N 120°17′15.00″W

Links
- Public license information: Public file; LMS
- Webcast: Listen Live
- Website: kissin977.com

KYSN (97.7 FM, "Kissin' 97.7") is a radio station broadcasting a country music format. Licensed to East Wenatchee, Washington, United States, the station serves the Wenatchee area. The station is currently owned by Townsquare Media and licensed to Townsquare License, LLC and features programming from Compass Media Networks.

== History ==
The station went on the air as KTRW on 1980-12-02. On 1984-07-04, the station changed its call sign to the current KYSN.

== Ownership ==
In June 2006, a deal was reached for KYSN to be acquired by Cherry Creek Radio from Fisher Radio Regional Group as part of a 24 station deal, with a total reported sale price of $33.3 million.

Effective June 17, 2022, Cherry Creek Radio sold KYSN as part of a 42 station/21 translator package to Townsquare Media for $18.75 million.
