= Steve McCarthy (ice hockey) =

Canadian ice hockey player (born 1981)

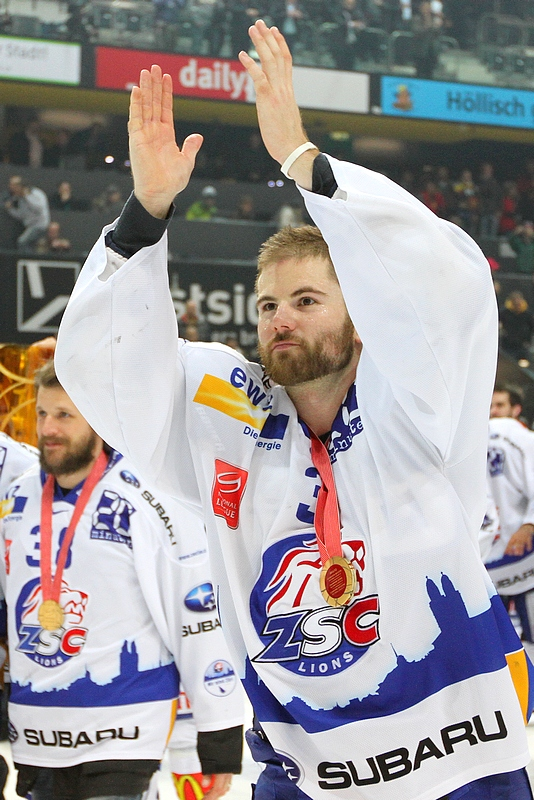
- Steve McCarthy with the ZSC Lions after winning the championship in Switzerland in 2012.
- Born: February 3, 1981 (age 45) Trail, British Columbia, Canada
- Height: 6 ft 1 in (185 cm)
- Weight: 198 lb (90 kg; 14 st 2 lb)
- Position: Defence
- Shot: Left
- Played for: Chicago Blackhawks; Vancouver Canucks; Atlanta Thrashers; Salavat Yulaev Ufa; TPS; ZSC Lions
- NHL draft: 23rd overall, 1999; Chicago Blackhawks
- Playing career: 2000–2016

Steve McCarthy (born February 3, 1981) is a Canadian former professional ice hockey defenceman and coach. McCarthy played in the National Hockey League with the Chicago Blackhawks, Vancouver Canucks and the Atlanta Thrashers. He also served an assistant coach for the Columbus Blue Jackets from the 2021–22 season to the 2025–26 season.

== Playing career ==
McCarthy was drafted by the Chicago Blackhawks with the twenty-third pick in the 1999 NHL entry draft. He made his debut in the 1999–2000 NHL season and he recorded an assist on his first shift. After playing 134 games with the Blackhawks, he was traded to the Vancouver Canucks on August 22, 2005 in exchange for a third-round pick in the 2007 NHL entry draft. He was then traded to the Atlanta Thrashers by the Canucks for a conditional fourth-round pick. on March 9, 2006

In the 2008-09 season, McCarthy left the NHL and signed a one-year contract with Russian team Salavat Yulaev Ufa of the newly formed Kontinental Hockey League. McCarthy struggled to adapt to the European transition and went scoreless in just 18 games with Ufa.

On July 10, 2009, McCarthy returned to the North America when he was signed by the Anaheim Ducks on a one-year contract. However, on September 24, before ever playing a game with the Ducks prior to the 2009-10 season McCarthy was traded back to Atlanta, for future considerations.

On October 1, 2010, McCarthy, went back to Europe, signing with TPS, whose squad had been decimated by in defence. He played 32 games in his only season for the team.

McCarthy signed a one-year deal with the ZSC Lions of the Swiss National League A on October 16, 2011, to play under former NHL coach Bob Hartley. On April 17, 2012 - with just 2.5 seconds left in regulation time - he scored the game-winning goal in game 7 of the Swiss playoff finals for ZSC Lions.

Helping the Lions to claim the title, McCarthy followed Bob Hartley, as the newly appointed head coach of the Calgary Flames, back to North America and signed with Flames AHL affiliate, the Abbotsford Heat after a successful try-out on October 7, 2012. McCarthy though was released by the Flames on January 18, 2013 and five days later on January 23, rejoined ZSC Lions for the remainder of the campaign.

In the 2014-15 season, McCarthy as a free agent belatedly signed a professional tryout contract with the AHL's Springfield Falcons on November 11, 2014. He played three games before being released. On February 23, 2015, he was again signed in the AHL in agreeing to a try-out contract with the Iowa Wild.

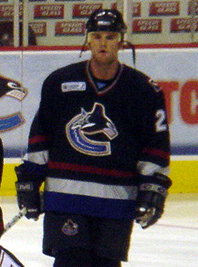
McCarthy while playing for the Vancouver Canucks

As an unsigned free agent over the summer, McCarthy continued his playing career by signing a one-year contract with the Kalamazoo Wings of the ECHL on October 3, 2015. In 30 games with the Wings, McCarthy contributed with 9 points before returning to the American League in signing a professional try-out contract with the Lake Erie Monsters on January 8, 2016. McCarthy featured in 17 games with the Monsters, and remained on the roster as a healthy scratch as the Monsters won their first Calder Cup.

On July 19, 2016, McCarthy signalled the end of his playing career after 16 professional seasons, in accepting an assistant coach role to remain with the Lake Erie Monsters.

== Coaching career ==
McCarthy was promoted to assistant coach of the Monsters' NHL affiliate, the Columbus Blue Jackets, in 2021. After four and a half seasons with the team, McCarthy was fired alongside head coach Dean Evason on January 12, 2026.

== International play ==
McCarthy was captain of Team Canada at the 2000 World Juniors Championships in Sweden. He led the team to a bronze medal finish, as Canada defeated the United States in a shootout.

== Career statistics ==
=== Regular season and playoffs ===
			Regular season					Playoffs
Season	Team	League	GP	G	A	Pts	PIM	GP	G	A	Pts	PIM
1996–97	Trail Smoke Eaters	BCHL	57	25	52	77	61	—	—	—	—	—
1996–97	Edmonton Ice	WHL	2	0	0	0	0	—	—	—	—	—
1997–98	Edmonton Ice	WHL	58	11	29	40	59	—	—	—	—	—
1998–99	Kootenay Ice	WHL	57	19	33	52	79	6	0	5	5	8
1999–2000	Kootenay Ice	WHL	37	13	23	36	36	—	—	—	—	—
1999–2000	Chicago Blackhawks	NHL	5	1	1	2	4	—	—	—	—	—
2000–01	Norfolk Admirals	AHL	7	0	4	4	2	—	—	—	—	—
2000–01	Chicago Blackhawks	NHL	44	0	5	5	8	—	—	—	—	—
2001–02	Norfolk Admirals	AHL	77	7	21	28	37	2	0	3	3	2
2001–02	Chicago Blackhawks	NHL	3	0	0	0	2	—	—	—	—	—
2002–03	Norfolk Admirals	AHL	19	1	6	7	14	9	0	4	4	0
2002–03	Chicago Blackhawks	NHL	57	1	4	5	23	—	—	—	—	—
2003–04	Chicago Blackhawks	NHL	25	1	3	4	8	—	—	—	—	—
2005–06	Vancouver Canucks	NHL	51	2	4	6	43	—	—	—	—	—
2005–06	Atlanta Thrashers	NHL	16	7	3	10	8	—	—	—	—	—
2006–07	Atlanta Thrashers	NHL	46	4	12	16	24	—	—	—	—	—
2007–08	Atlanta Thrashers	NHL	55	1	6	7	48	—	—	—	—	—
2008–09	Salavat Yulaev Ufa	KHL	18	0	0	0	16	—	—	—	—	—
2009–10	Chicago Wolves	AHL	25	2	5	7	28	—	—	—	—	—
2010–11	TPS	SM-l	32	0	0	0	81	—	—	—	—	—
2011–12	ZSC Lions	NLA	27	3	7	10	12	15	1	5	6	6
2012–13	Abbotsford Heat	AHL	30	2	8	10	27	—	—	—	—	—
2012–13	ZSC Lions	NLA	8	0	1	1	6	—	—	—	—	—
2013–14	ZSC Lions	NLA	3	0	0	0	2	18	0	5	5	6
2014–15	Springfield Falcons	AHL	3	0	0	0	6	—	—	—	—	—
2014–15	Iowa Wild	AHL	13	1	3	4	6	—	—	—	—	—
2015–16	Kalamazoo Wings	ECHL	30	2	7	9	18	—	—	—	—	—
2015–16	Lake Erie Monsters	AHL	17	0	1	1	6	—	—	—	—	—
NHL totals			302	17	38	55	168	—	—	—	—	—
AHL totals			191	13	48	61	126	11	0	7	7	2

=== International ===
Medal record

Representing Canada

Ice hockey

IIHF World U20 Championship
Bronze medal – third place	2000 Sweden	
Bronze medal – third place	2001 Russia	

Year	Team	Event	Result	GP	G	A	Pts	PIM
2000	Canada	WJC	3rd place, bronze medalist(s)	7	0	2	2	0
2001	Canada	WJC	3rd place, bronze medalist(s)	7	1	1	2	6
Junior totals				14	1	3	4	6

== Awards and honours ==
Awards	Year
WHL
East First All-Star Team	2000
NLA
Swiss Champion (ZSC Lions)	2012, 2014

Awards and achievements
Preceded by Mark Bell	Chicago Blackhawks first-round draft pick 1999	Succeeded by Mikhail Yakubov
