= KWLN =

Radio station in Wilson Creek, Washington

- Wilson Creek, Washington; United States
- Frequency: 103.3 MHz
- Branding: La Nueva

Programming
- Format: Spanish

Ownership
- Owner: Connoisseur Media; (Alpha Media Licensee LLC)
- Sister stations: KKRV; KKRT

History
- Former call signs: KVYF (1992–2000); KKXA (2000–2001)
- Call sign meaning: "Wentachee La Nueva"

Technical information
- Licensing authority: FCC
- Facility ID: 72880
- Class: C3
- ERP: 25,000 watts
- HAAT: 74 meters (243 ft)
- Transmitter coordinates: 47°16′39.5″N 119°0′4″W
- Translator: 92.1 K221BI (Wenatchee)
- Repeater: 104.7 KKRV-HD2 (Wenatchee)

Links
- Public license information: Public file; LMS
- Website: www.lanuevaradio.com

KWLN (103.3 FM) is a radio station broadcasting a Spanish music format. Licensed to Wilson Creek, Washington, United States, the station is owned by Connoisseur Media.

== History ==
The station was assigned the call letters KVYF on August 21, 1992. On August 23, 2000, the station changed its call sign to KKXA and on October 22, 2001 to the current KWLN.
