= Kootenay Ice =

- City: Cranbrook, British Columbia
- League: Western Hockey League
- Home arena: Western Financial Place
- Colours: Light blue, black, white, brown
- Website: www.kootenayice.net

Franchise history
- 1996–1998: Edmonton Ice
- 1998–2019: Kootenay Ice
- 2019–2023: Winnipeg Ice
- 2023–present: Wenatchee Wild

Championships
- Regular season titles: 1 (2004–05)
- Playoff championships: Memorial Cup: 1 2002; President's Cup: 3; 2000, 2002, 2011

The Kootenay Ice (officially stylized as ICE) were a Canadian major junior ice hockey team based in Cranbrook, British Columbia, competing in the Western Hockey League (WHL) and playing its home games at Western Financial Place. The franchise, which began as the Edmonton Ice before moving to Cranbrook in 1998, was owned by Ed Chynoweth from 1995 until it was sold to Winnipeg-based company 50 Below Sports and Entertainment in 2017. The team won three WHL championships and one Memorial Cup title as Canadian junior champions. Despite the club's on-ice success, the Ice moved to Winnipeg, Manitoba in 2019, where they were known as the Winnipeg Ice.

== History ==
The Ice franchise began play in 1996 as the Edmonton Ice. The club was founded by Ed Chynoweth after he left his position as the Western Hockey League's president. Chynoweth moved the Ice to Cranbrook in 1998 after two dismal seasons in Edmonton. The move to Cranbrook resulted in the folding of the successful local Junior A Cranbrook Colts and ultimately the entire Rocky Mountain Junior Hockey League as the remaining five RMJHL franchises from the Kootenays dropped to the Junior B Kootenay International Junior Hockey League within years of the Ice coming to the region.

The Kootenay Ice found significant on-ice success in their early years. The team won WHL championships in 2000 and 2002, along with the Memorial Cup in 2002 to become Canadian junior champions. The 2002 Ice team was inducted into the BC Hockey Hall of Fame in 2022. The Ice added a regular season title in 2004–05 and a third playoff championship in 2011. The latter title came under the direction of Jeff Chynoweth after Ed Chynoweth died in 2008.

In 2017, the Chynoweth family sold the team to Winnipeg-based 50 Below Sports + Entertainment Inc. The company's owners, Greg Fettes and Matt Cockell, were installed as the team's governor and president, respectively. A new logo was unveiled on May 1, 2017. The team's on-ice success diminished after their third championship, with the Ice winning only one playoff series after 2011 and missing the playoffs altogether for four straight seasons between 2015 and 2019. Operating in the league's second-smallest market, attendance became an issue and the league raised questions about the team's long-term viability in Cranbrook.

On January 29, 2019, the Ice announced that the team would relocate to Winnipeg after the 2018–19 season. The Winnipeg Ice began play in the 2019–20 season. In June 2023, after ownership failed to build a suitable arena in Winnipeg, the team was again sold and relocated to Wenatchee, Washington, where they became the Wenatchee Wild.

=== WHL Championship finals ===
- 1999–2000: Won, 4–2 vs. Spokane Chiefs
- 2001–02: Won, 4–2 vs. Red Deer Rebels
- 2010–11: Won, 4–1 vs. Portland Winterhawks

=== Memorial Cup finals ===
- 2002: Won, 6–3 vs. Victoriaville Tigres

== Season-by-season record ==
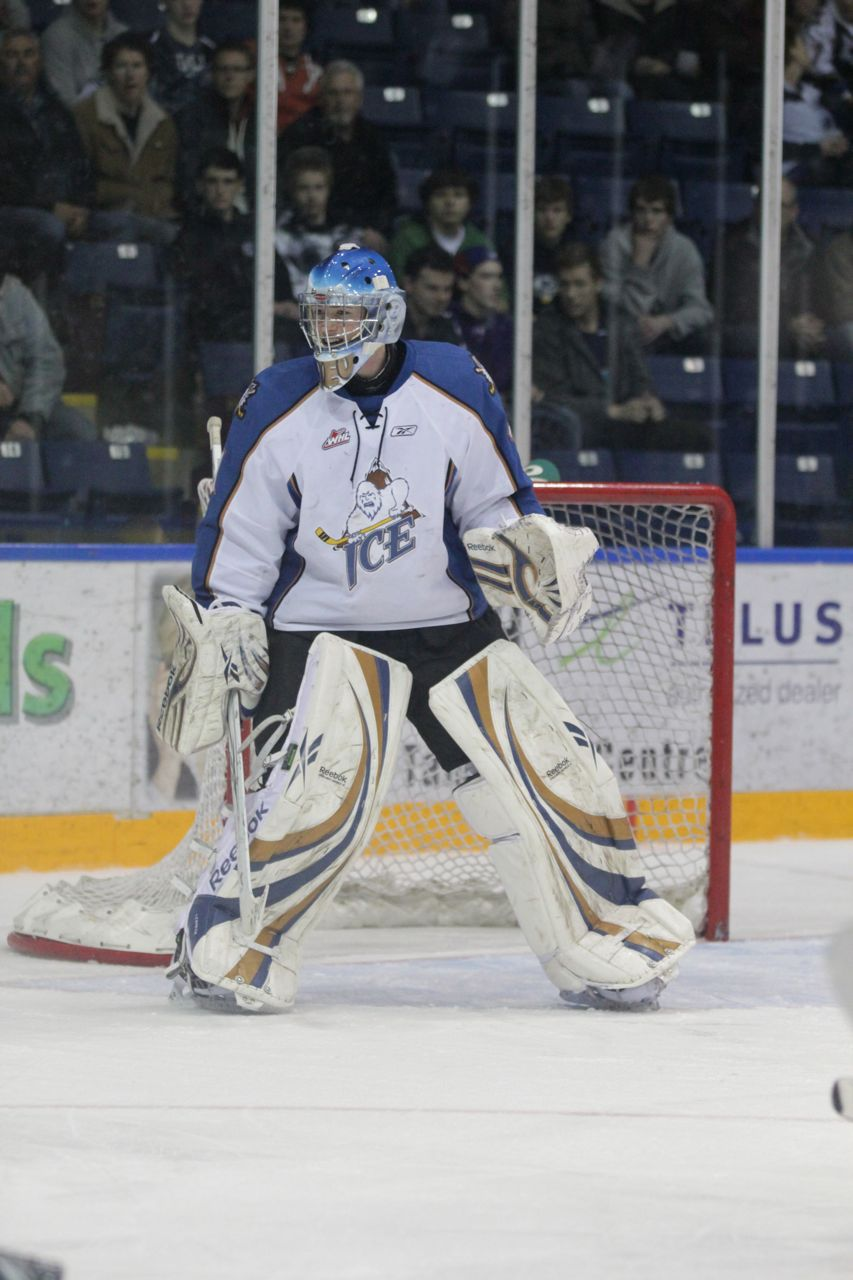
Nathan Lieuwen played for the Ice between 2007 and 2012.

Note: GP = Games played, W = Wins, L = Losses, T = Ties, OTL = Overtime losses, GF = Goals for, GA = Goals against

Season	GP	W	L	T	OTL	GF	GA	Points	Finish	Playoffs
1998–99	72	30	35	7	—	245	276	67	4th Central	Lost Eastern Conference quarterfinal
1999–2000	72	44	14	11	3	275	200	102	2nd Central	Won Championship
2000–01	72	45	17	4	6	286	213	100	2nd Central	Lost Eastern Conference semifinal
2001–02	72	38	27	7	0	276	223	83	2nd B.C.	Won Championship; Won Memorial Cup
2002–03	72	36	25	6	5	234	202	83	3rd B.C.	Lost Western Conference semifinal
2003–04	72	32	30	7	3	183	200	74	4th B.C.	Lost Western Conference quarterfinal
2004–05	72	47	15	7	3	218	137	104	1st B.C.	Lost Western Conference final
Season	GP	W	L	OTL	SOL	GF	GA	Points	Finish	Playoffs
2005–06	72	45	23	1	3	233	177	94	3rd B.C.	Lost Western Conference quarterfinal
2006–07	72	49	17	3	3	267	189	104	2nd Central	Lost Eastern Conference quarterfinal
2007–08	72	42	22	5	3	229	214	92	4th Central	Lost Eastern Conference semifinal
2008–09	72	35	29	2	6	220	224	78	3rd Central	Lost Eastern Conference quarterfinal
2009–10	72	43	24	3	2	252	215	91	2nd Central	Lost Eastern Conference quarterfinal
2010–11	72	46	21	1	4	272	218	97	3rd Central	Won Championship
2011–12	72	36	26	6	4	222	201	82	4th Central	Lost Eastern Conference quarterfinal
2012–13	72	35	35	2	0	203	221	72	5th Central	Lost Eastern Conference quarterfinal
2013–14	72	39	28	2	3	235	209	83	4th Central	Lost Eastern Conference semifinal
2014–15	72	37	31	1	3	245	248	78	4th Central	Lost Eastern Conference quarterfinal
2015–16	72	12	53	6	1	155	319	31	6th Central	Did not qualify
2016–17	72	14	46	10	2	177	335	40	6th Central	Did not qualify
2017–18	72	27	38	5	2	215	275	61	4th Central	Did not qualify
2018–19	68	13	45	7	3	181	324	36	6th Central	Did not qualify

== NHL alumni ==
- Riley Armstrong
- Dean Arsene
- Matt Berlin
- Dan Blackburn
- Zdenek Blatny
- Mike Comrie
- Adam Cracknell
- Nigel Dawes
- Cody Eakin
- Brennan Evans
- Cale Fleury
- Kris Foucault
- Matt Fraser
- Jeff Glass
- Mike Green
- Stanislav Gron
- Jason Jaffray
- Peyton Krebs
- Carson Lambos
- Nathan Lieuwen
- Ben Maxwell
- Steve McCarthy
- Ryan McGill
- Brayden McNabb
- Michael Milne
- Duncan Milroy
- John Negrin
- Luke Philp
- Noah Philp
- Tomas Plihal
- Roman Polak
- Max Reinhart
- Sam Reinhart
- Aaron Rome
- Ryan Russell
- Mackenzie Skapski
- Jarret Stoll
- Brett Sutter
- Marek Svatos
- Jaroslav Svoboda
- Rinat Valiev
- Matt Walker
- Kyle Wanvig
- Craig Weller
- Jeremy Yablonski

== See also ==
- List of ice hockey teams in British Columbia
