= KKRV =

Radio station in Wenatchee, Washington

- Wenatchee, Washington; United States
- Frequency: 104.7 MHz (HD Radio)
- Branding: Country 104.7

Programming
- Format: Country music
- Subchannels: HD2: Spanish (KWLN simulcast); HD3: Variety hits (Jack FM)

Ownership
- Owner: Connoisseur Media; (Alpha Media Licensee LLC)
- Sister stations: KWLN; KKRT

History
- First air date: May 20, 1981 (as KYJR-FM)
- Former call signs: KYJR-FM (1981–1988); KSSY (1988–1994)
- Call sign meaning: "River" (previous format)

Technical information
- Licensing authority: FCC
- Facility ID: 28635
- Class: C2
- ERP: 6,500 watts
- HAAT: 403 meters (1,322 ft)
- Transmitter coordinates: 47°28′43.4″N 120°12′53.2″W
- Translators: 105.1 K286CA (East Wenatchee); HD2: 92.1 K221BI (Wenatchee); HD3: 94.3 K232ED (Wenatchee)

Links
- Public license information: Public file; LMS
- Webcast: Listen live; Listen live (HD3)
- Website: www.kkrv.com; www.jack943.com (HD3)

KKRV (104.7 FM) is a radio station broadcasting a country music format licensed to Wenatchee, Washington, United States. The station is owned by Connoisseur Media, through Alpha Media Licensee LLC. The station is also simulcast on one broadcast translator - 105.1 FM.

== History ==
The station went on the air as KYJR-FM on May 20, 1981, as Top 40/hard rock station Y-105. On November 3, 1988, the station changed its call sign to KSSY when it had a format change to adult contemporary (Classy 105). On May 29, 1995, the call sign was changed to KKRV, to reflect the move to a classic rock format and its new branding as "The River". The station switched to its country format in 1998.

On May 20, 2014, KKRV became the first Wenatchee-area commercial station to broadcast in HD Radio. It added a simulcast of sister station KWLN on HD2 to provide better coverage in the broadcast area.

== 94.3 Jack FM ==
On April 1, 2018, Jack FM was launched, and a HD3 subchannel was added to KKRV to carry the Jack FM simulcast.

The HD3 channel can also be heard on 94.3 FM K232ED (hence the branding as 94.3 Jack FM), a frequency that was originally to be used to simulcast KKRT's signal to Zune and other radio receivers that did not pick up AM signals, but was later abandoned. Before the switch, it carried a simulcast of KKRV.
