= Peyton Krebs =

Canadian ice hockey player (born 2001)

- Born: January 26, 2001 (age 25) Okotoks, Alberta, Canada
- Height: 5 ft 11 in (180 cm)
- Weight: 188 lb (85 kg; 13 st 6 lb)
- Position: Centre
- Shoots: Left
- NHL team Former teams: Buffalo Sabres; Vegas Golden Knights
- National team: Canada
- NHL draft: 17th overall, 2019; Vegas Golden Knights
- Playing career: 2021–present

Peyton Krebs (born January 26, 2001) is a Canadian professional ice hockey player who is a centre for the Buffalo Sabres of the National Hockey League (NHL). He was drafted 17th overall by the Vegas Golden Knights in the first round of the 2019 NHL entry draft and made his NHL debut with Vegas in 2021.

== Early life ==
Krebs was born on January 26, 2001, in Okotoks, Alberta, Canada, to parents Cindy and Greg. His father is an engineer while his mother owns and operates a gift shop in Valleyview, Alberta. As the middle child of four, Krebs and his two brothers all played ice hockey growing up while his sister studied music.

== Playing career ==
=== Junior ===
The Kootenay Ice named Krebs the team's 23rd captain. During the 2017–18 season, he finished first in the WHL in points among rookies with 54. He was fourth on the team in scoring as a 16-year-old.

Krebs had 19 goals and 68 points in 64 games in the 2018–19 season. He suffered an Achilles tendon injury before the 2019 NHL entry draft, but was selected 17th overall by the Vegas Golden Knights.

Managing his rehabilitation into the 2019–20 season, Krebs remained with and practiced with the Golden Knights before signing a three-year, entry-level contract with Vegas on November 16, 2019. Upon receiving clearance to return, Krebs was then immediately returned to the WHL, joining his newly relocated junior club the Winnipeg Ice.

=== Vegas Golden Knights ===
Krebs made his NHL debut with the Golden Knights, registering an assist in a 6–5 defeat to the Minnesota Wild on May 3, 2021.

=== Buffalo Sabres ===
On November 4, 2021, Krebs was traded by the Golden Knights, along with Alex Tuch, a 2022 first-round draft pick and a 2023 second-round draft pick to the Buffalo Sabres in exchange for Jack Eichel and a 2023 third-round draft pick.

As a restricted free agent following his fifth season in Buffalo, Krebs avoided arbitration after he was re-signed to a four-year, $18 million contract extension with the Sabres on July 14, 2026.

== International play ==
Medal record

Representing Canada

Ice hockey

World Championships
Gold medal – first place	2023 Finland/Latvia	

World Junior Championships
Silver medal – second place	2021 Canada	

Krebs played for Team Canada, achieving 5 points in 5 games at the 2018 Hlinka Gretzky Cup, winning Gold. Krebs captained Team Canada at the 2019 IIHF World U18 Championships and led the team with 6 goals and 10 points, the highest-scoring non-American at the tournament. He earned a silver medal with Team Canada at the U-17’s in 2017.

== Personal life ==
Krebs became engaged to his girlfriend Erica on January 6, 2023. The two, now married, have one daughter named Kimberly. She was born August 26, 2024. His youngest brother Dru played for the Medicine Hat Tigers and currently plays for the Fort Wayne Komets in the ECHL while his oldest brother Dakota is playing at the University of Calgary.

== Career statistics ==
=== Regular season and playoffs ===
			Regular season					Playoffs
Season	Team	League	GP	G	A	Pts	PIM	GP	G	A	Pts	PIM
2015–16	UFA Bisons	AMHL	1	0	0	0	2	3	1	0	1	0
2016–17	UFA Bisons	AMHL	29	15	25	40	4	12	2	10	12	20
2016–17	Kootenay Ice	WHL	6	1	5	6	0	—	—	—	—	—
2017–18	Kootenay Ice	WHL	67	17	37	54	40	—	—	—	—	—
2018–19	Kootenay Ice	WHL	64	19	49	68	63	—	—	—	—	—
2019–20	Winnipeg Ice	WHL	38	12	48	60	38	—	—	—	—	—
2020–21	Winnipeg Ice	WHL	24	13	30	43	28	—	—	—	—	—
2020–21	Henderson Silver Knights	AHL	5	1	4	5	0	—	—	—	—	—
2020–21	Vegas Golden Knights	NHL	4	0	1	1	0	—	—	—	—	—
2021–22	Vegas Golden Knights	NHL	9	0	0	0	2	—	—	—	—	—
2021–22	Henderson Silver Knights	AHL	2	0	5	5	4	—	—	—	—	—
2021–22	Rochester Americans	AHL	18	4	11	15	12	10	0	11	11	4
2021–22	Buffalo Sabres	NHL	48	7	15	22	20	—	—	—	—	—
2022–23	Buffalo Sabres	NHL	74	9	17	26	50	—	—	—	—	—
2023–24	Buffalo Sabres	NHL	80	4	13	17	67	—	—	—	—	—
2024–25	Buffalo Sabres	NHL	81	10	18	28	60	—	—	—	—	—
2025–26	Buffalo Sabres	NHL	82	12	27	39	78	13	2	4	6	22
NHL totals			378	42	91	133	277	13	2	4	6	22

=== International ===
Year	Team	Event	Result	GP	G	A	Pts	PIM
2017	Canada Red	U17	2nd place, silver medalist(s)	5	1	5	6	2
2018	Canada	HG18	1st place, gold medalist(s)	5	2	3	5	2
2019	Canada	U18	4th	7	6	4	10	4
2021	Canada	WJC	2nd place, silver medalist(s)	7	3	5	8	4
2023	Canada	WC	1st place, gold medalist(s)	10	1	4	5	2
Junior totals				24	12	17	29	12
Senior totals				10	1	4	5	2

== Awards and honours ==
Award	Year
AMHL
First All-Star Team	2017
Top Forward	2017
WHL
Top Scorer	2021
Player of the Year	2021

Awards and achievements
Preceded by Erik Brännström	Vegas Golden Knights first-round draft pick 2019	Succeeded by Brendan Brisson
