= Ed Chynoweth =

Canadian ice hockey executive (1941–2008)

- Born: December 14, 1941; Dodsland, Saskatchewan, Canada
- Died: April 22, 2008 (aged 66); Calgary, Alberta, Canada
- Known for: WHL president (1972–1995); CHL president (1975–1995); Edmonton Ice/Kootenay Ice owner (1995–2008)
- Awards: Hockey Hall of Fame (2008)

Edward Chynoweth (December 14, 1941 – April 22, 2008) was a Canadian ice hockey executive. He served as president of the Western Hockey League (WHL) and the Canadian Hockey League (CHL) for over 20 years each. He was also a league director, team owner, and reported by The Canadian Press to have been one of the most influential men in junior ice hockey in Canada.

== Career ==
Chynoweth became the WHL's first full-time president in 1972, a job he held until 1995, except for a brief stint as the general manager of the Calgary Wranglers in 1979–80. Chynoweth also helped to form the CHL in 1972, bringing Canada's three major junior leagues under one banner, and served as its president from 1975 until 1995. Ontario Hockey League commissioner David Branch called Chynoweth "the architect of the Canadian Hockey League as we know it today." Chynoweth left his posts to form the expansion Edmonton Ice in 1995. He remained the team's president and governor after it became the Kootenay Ice, as well as the WHL's chairman of the board, at the time of his death.

== Personal life ==
Chynoweth was married to Linda and had two sons. Dean Chynoweth was a National Hockey League player and coached professionally . Jeff Chynoweth was a general manager in the WHL.

Chynoweth died of kidney cancer in Calgary at the age of 66.

== Honours and awards ==
Chynoweth was elected to the Alberta Sports Hall of Fame in 2000. In 2007, the WHL renamed its championship trophy the Ed Chynoweth Cup in his honour. The Ed Chynoweth Trophy, awarded to the top scorer at the Memorial Cup tournament is named after him. Chynoweth was a member of the selection committee at the Hockey Hall of Fame.

Chynoweth was posthumously inducted as a builder into the Hockey Hall of Fame in Toronto on November 10, 2008.
