= Edmonton Ice =

- City: Edmonton, Alberta
- League: Western Hockey League
- Operated: 1996–98
- Home arena: Northlands Agricom
- Colours: Blue, bronze, black, and white

Franchise history
- 1996–1998: Edmonton Ice
- 1998–2019: Kootenay Ice
- 2019–2023: Winnipeg Ice
- 2023–present: Wenatchee Wild

The Edmonton Ice were a Canadian major junior ice hockey team based in Edmonton, Alberta. A Western Hockey League expansion team established in 1996, the team played only two seasons from 1996 to 1998 before relocating to Cranbrook, British Columbia, where the team became known as the Kootenay Ice.

== History ==
The city of Edmonton had a rich history with the Western Hockey League (WHL), with Edmonton Oil Kings owner Bill Hunter serving as a driving force behind the establishment of the league in 1966. The Oil Kings were a successful early franchise, but relocated to Portland in 1976 after the establishment of the professional Edmonton Oilers of the World Hockey Association. The Oil Kings briefly returned to the league for the 1978–79 season, but when the team relocated again, Edmonton was left without top-level junior hockey. After nearly two decades, the WHL expanded to Edmonton in 1996, and the Ice began play at the Northlands Agricom.

On January 16, 1996, Dave Siciliano was announced as the first head coach for the Ice. Siciliano and team owner Ed Chynoweth were committed to building a relationship between the Ice and local minor ice hockey programs. The Ice completed the 1996–97 season with 14 wins in 72 games, placing last overall in the league, and did not qualify for the playoffs.

When the team began the 1997–98 season with nine losses and one tie, Siciliano was fired on October 24, 1997, and replaced by assistant coach Ryan McGill. During Siciliano's tenure, the Ice lost 31 games by a one-goal margin. The team gained only three more wins and again missed the playoffs.

After two seasons, the team relocated to Cranbrook, British Columbia, and became the Kootenay Ice. The team has since been relocated twice more. In 2019, the team moved from Cranbrook to Winnipeg and was known as the Winnipeg Ice; then, in 2023, the team moved to Wenatchee, Washington, where they are known as the Wenatchee Wild. Edmonton gained a new WHL expansion franchise in 2007, which was named the Edmonton Oil Kings after the original Edmonton WHL club.

== Season-by-season record ==
Note: GP = Games played, W = Wins, L = Losses, T = Ties Pts = Points, GF = Goals for, GA = Goals against

Season	GP	W	L	T	GF	GA	Points	Finish	Playoffs
1996–97	72	14	56	2	231	295	30	5th Central	Did not qualify
1997–98	72	17	49	6	242	328	40	4th Central	Did not qualify

== NHL alumni ==
- Dean Arsene
- Mike Green
- Jay Henderson
- Jason Jaffray
- Steve McCarthy
- Jaroslav Obsut
- Jarret Stoll
- Kyle Wanvig
- Jeremy Yablonski
- Dmytro Yakushyn

== See also ==
- List of ice hockey teams in Alberta
