= Winnipeg Ice =

Western Hockey League team in Winnipeg, Manitoba (2019-2023)

- City: Winnipeg, Manitoba
- League: Western Hockey League
- Conference: Eastern
- Division: East
- Home arena: Wayne Fleming Arena (capacity: 1,600)
- Colours: Light blue, black, white

Franchise history
- 1996–1998: Edmonton Ice
- 1998–2019: Kootenay Ice
- 2019–2023: Winnipeg Ice
- 2023–present: Wenatchee Wild

Championships
- Regular season titles: 2 (2021–22, 2022–23)
- Playoff championships: Conference champions: 1 (2022–23)

The Winnipeg Ice (officially stylized as ICE) were a Canadian major junior ice hockey team based in Winnipeg, Manitoba. Founded as an expansion Western Hockey League team in 1996 as the Edmonton Ice, the team played in Cranbrook, British Columbia from 1998 to 2019 as the Kootenay Ice. The team moved to Winnipeg ahead of the 2019–20 WHL season, and played home games at Wayne Fleming Arena. Despite success on the ice, a failure to construct a new arena for the team—a condition of the team's move to Winnipeg—led to the team being sold and relocated to Wenatchee, Washington ahead of the 2023–24 season.

== History ==
The Ice were founded in 1996 as the Edmonton Ice, an expansion team owned by Ed Chynoweth, the WHL's longtime president. The team relocated to Cranbrook, British Columbia in 1998, becoming the Kootenay Ice. In Cranbrook, the team won three WHL championships in 2000, 2002, and 2011, and captured the Memorial Cup in 2002. The team was purchased by 50 Below Sports + Entertainment Inc. in 2017.

Despite the team's on-ice success, the league expressed concern about the team's long-term viability in one of the region's smallest major junior hockey markets. In January 2019, the Ice announced a move to Winnipeg after the 2018–19 season, with plans to play at Wayne Fleming Arena on the University of Manitoba campus until a new arena was constructed. As part of the relocation, the Ice were moved to the WHL's East Division.

The Winnipeg Ice played their first regular season game on September 20, 2019, defeating the Brandon Wheat Kings by a score of 3–2; they made their home debut the following day, losing a re-match against the rival Wheat Kings by a score of 4–2 in front of a sold-out crowd. The season wound up being cut short and the playoffs cancelled by the COVID-19 pandemic; the following season was shortened and heavily modified, with East Division teams playing a 24-game in-division schedule with all games centralized in Regina, Saskatchewan. When the league resumed regular scheduling in 2021–22, the Ice proved themselves to be a contending team. Led by stars including Zach Benson and Matthew Savoie, Winnipeg won consecutive Scotty Munro Memorial Trophies for the best regular season record in 2021–22 and 2022–23—including franchise-record marks of 57 wins and 115 points in the latter season—and in 2023 advanced to the league's championship final, losing a five-game series to the Seattle Thunderbirds. During the series, the Ice played two home games at Canada Life Centre, home rink of Winnipeg's professional hockey teams.

While the team enjoyed on-ice success, the failure to construct a new arena led to the team being sold once again. On June 16, 2023, the team was sold to David White of the Shoot the Puck Foundation, who would relocate the club to Wenatchee, Washington ahead of the 2023–24 season, where they became the Wenatchee Wild.

== Season-by-season record ==
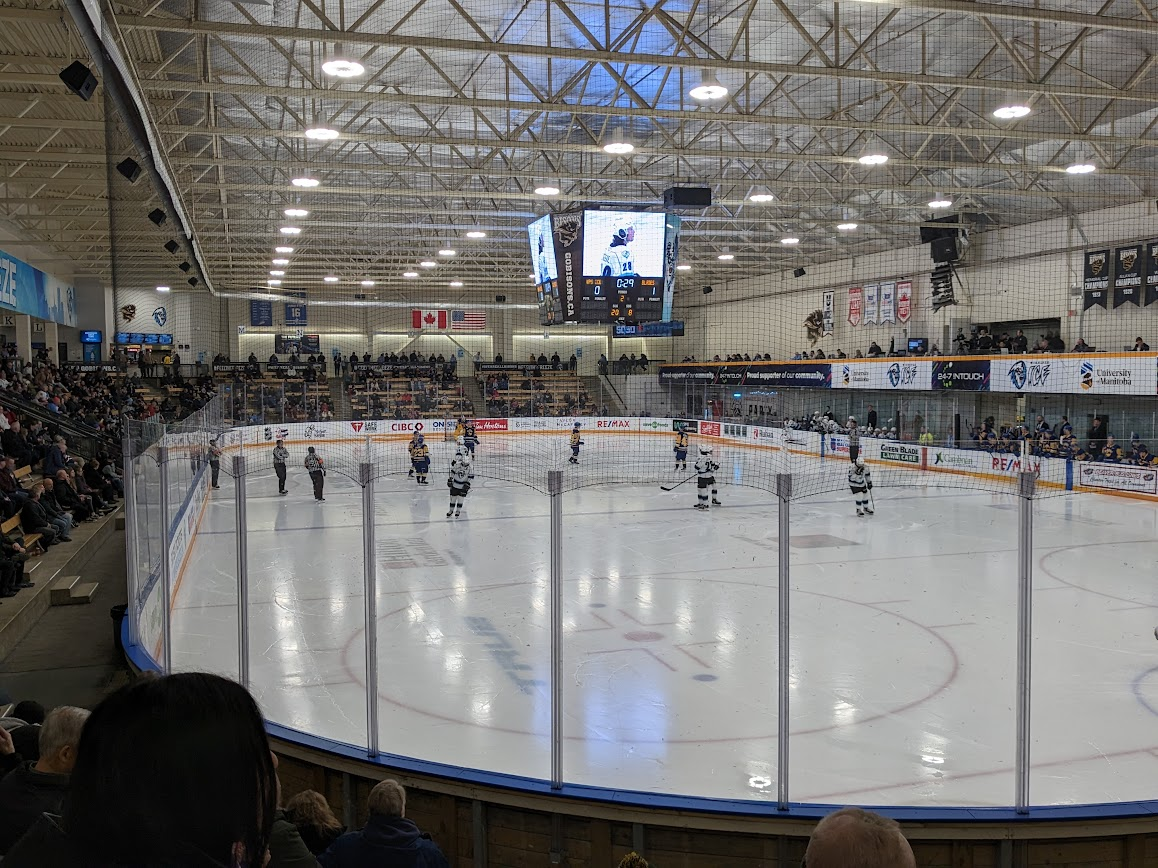
The ICE hosting the Saskatoon Blades at Wayne Fleming Arena in 2023.

Note: GP = Games played, W = Wins, L = Losses, OTL = Overtime losses, SOL = Shootout losses, GF = Goals for, GA = Goals against

Season	GP	W	L	OTL	SOL	GF	GA	Points	Finish	Playoffs
2019–20	63	38	24	1	0	231	207	77	2nd East	Cancelled due to the COVID-19 pandemic
2020–21	24	18	5	1	0	100	70	37	2nd East	No playoffs held due to COVID-19 pandemic
2021–22	68	53	10	3	2	317	152	111	1st East	Lost Eastern Conference final
2022–23	68	57	10	1	0	325	177	115	1st East	Lost Finals

== WHL Championship history ==
- 2022–23: Loss, 1–4 vs Seattle Thunderbirds

== NHL alumni ==
- Zach Benson
- Jack Finley
- Conor Geekie
- Peyton Krebs
- Carson Lambos
- Michael Milne
- Matthew Savoie
