= KPQ-FM =

Coordinates: 47°16′27″N 120°25′34″W

- Wenatchee, Washington; United States
- Broadcast area: Wenatchee, Washington; Yakima, Washington
- Frequency: 102.1 MHz
- Branding: 102.1 The Quake

Programming
- Format: Classic rock
- Affiliations: Compass Media Networks

Ownership
- Owner: Townsquare Media; (Townsquare License, LLC)
- Sister stations: KAPL-FM, KKWN, KPQ, KWNC, KWWW-FM, KYSN, KYSP

History
- First air date: November 15, 1967

Technical information
- Licensing authority: FCC
- Facility ID: 71524
- Class: C
- ERP: 35,000 watts
- HAAT: 809 meters (2,654 ft)

Links
- Public license information: Public file; LMS
- Webcast: Listen Live
- Website: thequake1021.com

KPQ-FM (102.1 MHz, "The Quake") is a classic rock radio station primarily serving Wenatchee and Central Washington. KPQ-FM operates with an ERP of 35 kW with its city of license being Wenatchee, Washington.

== See also ==
- List of three-letter broadcast call signs in the United States
