= KYSP =

- Wenatchee, Washington; United States
- Broadcast area: Wenatchee, Washington
- Frequency: 1340 kHz
- Branding: 1340 The Hawk

Programming
- Format: Sports
- Affiliations: Fox Sports Radio; Washington State-Learfield Sports Network (Men's Basketball)

Ownership
- Owner: Townsquare Media; (Townsquare License, LLC)
- Sister stations: KAPL-FM, KKWN, KPQ, KPQ-FM, KWNC, KWWW-FM, KYSN

History
- First air date: 1948 (as KWNW)
- Former call signs: KWNW (1948–1957); KMEL (1957–1976); KWWW (1976–1993); KWWX (1993–2008); KZNW (2008–2015); KWWX (2015–2016)

Technical information
- Licensing authority: FCC
- Facility ID: 59049
- Class: C
- Power: 1,000 watts
- Transmitter coordinates: 47°23′49.5″N 120°16′29.3″W

Links
- Public license information: Public file; LMS
- Webcast: Listen Live
- Website: 1340thehawk.com

KYSP (1340 AM) is a radio station broadcasting a sports format serving the Wenatchee, Washington area in the United States. The station is owned by Townsquare Media.

== History ==
The station first went on the air in 1948. In the 1970s, KWWW was a pop/disco station, than went to a Top 40 format in the 80s. In 1985, it simulcasted KW3-FM when it was transitioning to its new FM position at 100.9. That lasted in until 1990, when it adopted a local news format, which lasted a few months. In 1991, the station changed to a golden oldies format.

The station changed formats again as KWWX on September 24, 1993, to serve Latino listeners in the Wenatchee community. In 2007, after Cherry Creek Radio's acquisition of KPQ (AM) and KPQ-FM, it moved to 106.7 FM (formally KZPH) so it wouldn't conflict with The Quake 102.1's classic rock format.

On January 16, 2008, the station changed its call sign to KZNW to reflect its new all sports format (as The Zone 1340), as an affiliate of Fox Sports Radio and the flagship station of the Wenatchee Wild hockey team.

The station changed to its KWWX call sign on August 10, 2015. It became a Hispanic format station which it was when it transferred from 106.7 FM (under its Juan FM format) to its AM frequency of 1340 . It changed to its current KYSP call sign, and a return to Fox Sports Radio as "1340 The Hawk" (a nod to sister station KPQ's connection as the regional affiliate of the Seahawks Radio Network), on August 1, 2016.
