= KKWN =

- Cashmere, Washington; United States
- Broadcast area: Wenatchee, Washington
- Frequency: 106.7 MHz
- Branding: Talk 106.7

Programming
- Format: Talk
- Affiliations: Fox News Radio; Compass Media Networks; Premiere Networks; Radio America; Salem Radio Network; Westwood One

Ownership
- Owner: Townsquare Media; (Townsquare License, LLC)
- Sister stations: KAPL-FM, KPQ, KPQ-FM, KWNC, KWWW-FM, KYSN, KYSP

History
- First air date: 1994 (as KZPH)
- Former call signs: KZPH (1991–2008); KWWX (2008–2015)
- Call sign meaning: KKWeNatchee

Technical information
- Licensing authority: FCC
- Facility ID: 5285
- Class: A
- ERP: 6,000 watts
- HAAT: -73 meters
- Transmitter coordinates: 47°30′20.4″N 120°24′37.2″W
- Repeater: 1370 KWNC (Quincy)

Links
- Public license information: Public file; LMS
- Webcast: Listen Live
- Website: talk1067.com

KKWN (106.7 FM) is a radio station broadcasting a talk radio format. Licensed to Cashmere, Washington, United States, the station serves the Wenatchee, Washington, area. The station is currently owned by Townsquare Media and licensed to Townsquare License, LLC.

The station was assigned the KZPH call sign by the Federal Communications Commission on February 1, 1991. The station changed its call sign to KWWX on January 23, 2008, and to the current KKWN on August 10, 2015. It broadcasts an all news/talk format, which is simulcasted on 1370 AM KWNC located in Quincy.

== Ownership ==
In June 2006, a deal was reached for the then-KZPH to be acquired by Cherry Creek Media from Fisher Radio Regional Group as part of a 24-station deal with a total reported sale price of $33.3 million.

Effective June 17, 2022, Cherry Creek Media sold KKWN as part of a 42 station/21 translator package to Townsquare Media for $18.75 million.
