= KPQ (AM) =

Radio station in Wenatchee, Washington

- Wenatchee, Washington; United States
- Broadcast area: Central Washington
- Frequency: 560 kHz
- Branding: Newsradio 560 KPQ

Programming
- Format: News/talk
- Affiliations: ABC News Radio; NBC News Radio; Compass Media Networks; Premiere Networks; Westwood One; Seattle Seahawks Radio Network; Washington State-Learfield Sports Network (Football); Wenatchee Wild

Ownership
- Owner: Townsquare Media; (Townsquare License, LLC)
- Sister stations: KAPL-FM, KKWN, KPQ-FM, KWNC, KWWW-FM, KYSN, KYSP

History
- First air date: 1926 (as KGCL Seattle); December 28, 1929 (in Wenatchee)
- Former call signs: KGCL (1926–1928)

Technical information
- Licensing authority: FCC
- Facility ID: 71715
- Class: B
- Power: 5,000 watts
- Transmitter coordinates: 47°27′11.5″N 120°19′47.3″W
- Translator: 101.7 K269HC (Wenatchee)

Links
- Public license information: Public file; LMS
- Webcast: Listen Live
- Website: kpq.com

KPQ (560 kHz) is a commercial AM radio station, licensed to Wenatchee, Washington, and serving the North Central Washington region. The station is owned by Townsquare Media and broadcasts a news/talk radio format. The radio studios and offices are on North Wenatchee Avenue.

KPQ has a power of 5,000 watts. By day, its signal is non-directional; however, to protect other stations on 560 AM, at night, it uses a directional antenna. Programming is also heard on 250-watt FM translator K269HC at 101.7 MHz.

== Programming ==
KPQ has three news blocks on weekdays, in morning drive time, at noon and at 5 p.m. Much of the rest of the weekday schedule is nationally syndicated talk shows: "The Clay Travis and Buck Sexton Show," "The Lars Larson Northwest Show," "The Ramsey Show with Dave Ramsey," "Coast to Coast AM with George Noory" and "America in The Morning." A Pacific Northwest Agriculture hour is heard just before sunrise. The station provides regional news for Central Washington and has the largest radio News/Ag Department in the region.

Weekends feature shows on health, money, home repair, the outdoors, technology, law, travel, cars and RVs. Syndicated weekend hosts include Leo Laporte, Bill Handel and Rudy Maxa. Don West provides sports reports and the station carries Seattle Seahawks and Washington State Cougars football broadcasts. Most hours begin with a news update from ABC News Radio.

== History ==
Former logo.

KPQ was first licensed in Seattle, with the sequentially assigned call sign KGCL, on September 3, 1926, to Louis Wasmer. Local radio engineer Francis J. Brott built KGCL's original 15 watt transmitter, which began broadcasting from the Brott Radio Laboratories building. The station's initial schedule was a single one-hour weekly program on Wednesday nights from 8 to 9 o'clock, announced by Brott and sponsored by the Hopper Kelly Music Company.

Louis Wasmer, who had put station KHQ on the air in Seattle in early 1922, moved it to Spokane in the summer of 1925. Although he now lived in Spokane, Wasmer took on Archie Taft as a local partner for this new Seattle station. In December 1926, station operations were transferred to the Piper & Taft building, site of a sporting goods store that had expanded into retail radio receiver sales. Beginning in June 1927, KGCL was assigned to 1300 kHz, sharing this frequency with KPCB (now KIRO), owned by the Pacific Coast Biscuit Company.

In 1928, KGCL's call sign was changed to KPQ. The station continued to be operated by Piper & Taft and to share time with KPCB. At the time of its debut as KPQ, the schedule was announced as Tuesday, Thursday and Saturday from 8 a.m. to 4 p.m., and Monday, Wednesday and Friday afternoons starting at 4:30 p.m. On November 11, 1928, under the provisions of the Federal Radio Commission's General Order 40, KPQ and KPCB were reassigned to share 1210 kHz.

In late 1929, it was announced that the recently formed Wescoast Broadcasting Company had purchased both KPCB and KPQ, as part of a plan to form a regional radio network along with KVOS in Bellingham and KXRO in Aberdeen. Included with the purchase were plans to relocate KPQ from Seattle to the Cascadian Hotel in Wenatchee. KPQ's first broadcast from Wenatchee occurred on December 28, 1929.

In early 1930, KPCB and KPQ were reassigned to 1500 kHz, although shortly thereafter, KPCB moved to another frequency, giving KPQ unlimited broadcasting hours. In March 1941, as part of the implementation of the North American Regional Broadcasting Agreement, most stations on 1500 kHz, including KPQ, were moved to 1490 kHz. On April 1, 1942, KPQ moved to 560 kHz, where it has been located ever since.

In 2007, Wescoast Broadcasting, which had been KPQ's licensee for 78 years, was sold to Cherry Creek Radio, and KPQ's studios were moved from Mission Street to Wenatchee Avenue.

In August 2021, KPQ started a simulcast on translator K269HC at 101.7 FM.

Effective June 17, 2022, Cherry Creek Radio sold KPQ to Townsquare Media for $18.75 milion, as part of a 42-station/21-translator package.

== See also ==
- List of three-letter broadcast call signs in the United States
