= 2024–25 WHL season =

- League: Western Hockey League
- Sport: Ice hockey
- Duration: Regular season September 20, 2024 – March 23, 2025; Playoffs March 28, 2025 – May 16, 2025
- Teams: 22
- TV partner(s): KRCW-TV, KZJO, CBC, TSN, RDS, Victory+

Regular season
- Scotty Munro Memorial Trophy: Everett Silvertips (2)
- Season MVP: Gavin McKenna (Medicine Hat Tigers)
- Top scorer: Andrew Cristall (Kelowna/Spokane)

Playoffs
- Playoffs MVP: Harrison Meneghin (Tigers)
- Finals champions: Medicine Hat Tigers (6)
- Runners-up: Spokane Chiefs

WHL seasons
- 2023–24 2025–26

2024–25 CHL seasons
- League: Canadian Hockey League
- Sport: Ice hockey
- Duration: OHL; September 2024–May 2025; QMJHL; September 2024–May 2025; WHL; September 2024–May 2025
- Teams: 60
- TV partner(s): CBC Television/Gem, TSN, RDS, Rogers TV, Shaw TV
- Season MVP: Gavin McKenna (Medicine Hat Tigers) (WHL)
- Top scorer: Michael Misa (Saginaw Spirit) (OHL)

Memorial Cup
- Finals champions: London Knights (OHL) (3rd title)
- Runners-up: Medicine Hat Tigers (WHL)

The 2024–25 WHL season was the 59th season of the Western Hockey League (WHL). The regular season started on September 20, 2024, and ended on March 23, 2025. The 2025 WHL playoffs began on March 28 and ended on May 16, 2025.

The Medicine Hat Tigers won the Ed Chynoweth Cup as league champions and represented the WHL at the 2025 Memorial Cup, which was hosted by the Rimouski Océanic of the Quebec Maritimes Junior Hockey League, hosted at Colisée Financière Sun Life in Rimouski, Quebec.

== Standings ==
=== Conference standings ===
Western Conference
Pos	Div	Team	Pld	W	L	OTL	SOL	GF	GA	Pts	PCT
1	U.S.	x, y, z – Everett Silvertips	68	48	12	4	4	277	178	104	.765
2	B.C.	x, y – Victoria Royals	68	40	17	4	7	272	218	91	.669
3	U.S.	x – Spokane Chiefs	68	45	20	1	2	292	202	93	.684
4	B.C.	x – Prince George Cougars	68	41	21	4	2	251	222	88	.647
5	U.S.	x – Portland Winterhawks	68	36	28	3	1	261	269	76	.559
6	B.C.	x – Vancouver Giants	68	34	26	8	0	252	246	76	.559
7	U.S.	x – Tri-City Americans	68	32	29	6	1	234	268	71	.522
8	U.S.	x – Seattle Thunderbirds	68	30	33	4	1	212	257	65	.478
9	U.S.	e – Wenatchee Wild	68	23	36	8	1	207	253	55	.404
10	B.C.	e – Kamloops Blazers	68	24	39	4	1	206	271	53	.390
11	B.C.	e – Kelowna Rockets	68	18	44	4	2	213	311	42	.309

Source: "Standings". CHL.ca. WHL.
e – eliminated from playoff contention; x – clinched playoff; y – clinched division; z – best regular season record

Eastern Conference
Pos	Div	Team	Pld	W	L	OTL	SOL	GF	GA	Pts	PCT
1	Central	x, y – Medicine Hat Tigers	68	47	17	3	1	300	193	98	.721
2	East	x, y – Prince Albert Raiders	68	39	23	5	1	253	228	84	.618
3	Central	x – Calgary Hitmen	68	45	17	3	3	266	183	96	.706
4	Central	x – Lethbridge Hurricanes	68	42	21	3	2	226	199	89	.654
5	East	x – Brandon Wheat Kings	68	38	23	4	3	255	213	83	.610
6	East	x – Saskatoon Blades	68	37	23	4	4	235	218	82	.603
7	Central	x – Edmonton Oil Kings	68	37	27	2	2	248	211	78	.574
8	East	x – Swift Current Broncos	68	35	30	1	2	240	256	73	.537
9	Central	e – Red Deer Rebels	68	26	34	6	2	174	244	60	.441
10	East	e – Regina Pats	68	16	44	5	3	170	285	40	.294
11	East	e – Moose Jaw Warriors	68	15	45	6	2	189	308	38	.279

Source: "Standings". CHL.ca. WHL.
e – eliminated from playoff contention; x – clinched playoff; y – clinched division

== Statistical leaders ==
=== Scoring leaders ===
Players are listed by points, then goals.

Note: GP = Games played; G = Goals; A = Assists; Pts. = Points; PIM = Penalty minutes

Player	Team	GP	G	A	Pts	PIM
Andrew Cristall	Kelowna/Spokane	57	48	84	132	34
Gavin McKenna	Medicine Hat Tigers	56	41	88	129	19
Berkly Catton	Spokane Chiefs	57	38	71	109	30
Kyle Chyzowski	Portland Winterhawks	66	41	64	105	67
Oasiz Wiesblatt	Medicine Hat Tigers	66	36	67	103	148
Oliver Tulk	Calgary Hitmen	65	38	62	100	20
Ben Kindel	Calgary Hitmen	65	35	64	99	39
Luke Mistelbacher	Swift Current Broncos	67	42	51	93	34
Shea Van Olm	Spokane Chiefs	66	49	43	92	68
Cole Reschny	Victoria Royals	62	26	66	92	44

=== Leading goaltenders ===
These are the goaltenders that lead the league in GAA that played at least 60 minutes.

Note: GP = Games played; Mins = Minutes played; W = Wins; L = Losses; OTL = Overtime losses; SOL = Shootout losses; SO = Shutouts; GAA = Goals against average; Sv% = Save percentage

Player	Team	GP	Mins	W	L	OTL	SOL	SO	GAA	Sv%
Raiden LeGall	Everett Silvertips	23	1,384	16	2	1	3	1	2.17	.921
Daniel Hauser	Wenatchee/Calgary	47	2,569	28	13	2	1	5	2.55	.913
Harrison Meneghin	Lethbridge/Medicine Hat	36	2,069	23	10	1	1	3	2.58	.900
Jesse Sanche	Everett Silvertips	35	1,991	23	9	2	0	2	2.65	.903
Jordan Switzer	Medicine Hat Tigers	32	1,813	23	6	2	0	4	2.65	.901

== 2025 WHL playoffs ==
Conference quarterfinals	Conference semifinals
E1	Medicine Hat	4
E8	Swift Current	1
1	Medicine Hat	4
2	Prince Albert	0
E2	Prince Albert	4
E7	Edmonton	3
Eastern
E3	Calgary	4
E6	Saskatoon	0
3	Calgary	3
4	Lethbridge	4
E4	Lethbridge	4
E5	Brandon	1
Note: Pairings are re-seeded after the first round.
W1	Everett	4
W8	Seattle	2
1	Everett	3
5	Portland	4
W2	Victoria	4
W7	Tri-City	1
Western
W3	Spokane	4
W6	Vancouver	1
2	Victoria	2
3	Spokane	4
W4	Prince George	3
W5	Portland	4

Conference finals
1	Medicine Hat	4
4	Lethbridge	0
3	Spokane	4
5	Portland	0

WHL championship
E1	Medicine Hat	4
W3	Spokane	1

== Conference quarterfinals ==
=== Eastern conference ===
==== (1) Medicine Hat Tigers vs. (8) Swift Current Broncos ====
March 28	Swift Current Broncos	0–4	Medicine Hat Tigers	Co-op Place	Recap
No scoring		First period	2:11 - Oasiz Wiesblatt (1)
No scoring		Second period	15:50 - Oasiz Wiesblatt (2)
No scoring		Third period	10:31 - pp - Oasiz Wiesblatt (3); 18:29 - en - Bryce Pickford (1)
Reid Dyck (23 saves / 26 shots)		Goalie stats	Harrison Meneghin (21 saves / 21 shots)

March 29	Swift Current Broncos	3–6	Medicine Hat Tigers	Co-op Place	Recap
Brady Birnie (1) - 1:10		First period	0:46 - Bryce Pickford (2); 3:44 - Ryder Ritchie (1); 7:47 - pp - Oasiz Wiesblatt (4)
Rylan Gould (1) - 8:36; Clarke Caswell (1) - 15:30		Second period	10:40 - pp - Oasiz Wiesblatt (5)
No scoring		Third period	16:07 - pp - Ryder Ritchie (2); 17:42 - en - Gavin McKenna (1)
Reid Dyck (27 saves / 32 shots)		Goalie stats	Harrison Meneghin (15 saves / 18 shots)

April 1	Medicine Hat Tigers	4–5	Swift Current Broncos	InnovationPlex	Recap
Bryce Pickford (3) - 9:03		First period	9:52 - Trae Wilke (1); 13:41 - Carlin Dezainde (1)
Josh Van Mulligen (1) - 5:16; Hunter St. Martin (1) - sh - 12:52		Second period	7:05 - Carlin Dezainde (2); 8:10 - pp - Carlin Dezainde (3)
Oasiz Wiesblatt (6) - 9:26		Third period	16:10 - Connor Dale (1)
Harrison Meneghin (7 saves / 11 shots); Jordan Switzer (14 saves / 15 shots)		Goalie stats	Reid Dyck (31 saves / 35 shots)

April 2	Medicine Hat Tigers	4–3	OT	Swift Current Broncos	InnovationPlex	Recap
Ryder Ritchie (3) - pp - 11:25		First period		1:34 - Carlin Dezainde (4); 6:46 - pp - Clarke Caswell (2)
Oasiz Wiesblatt (7) - 3:59		Second period		No scoring
Gavin McKenna (2) - 3:24		Third period		18:03 - Luke Mistelbacher (1)
Hunter St. Martin (2) - 2:08		First overtime period		No scoring
Harrison Meneghin (25 saves / 28 shots)		Goalie stats		Reid Dyck (44 saves / 48 shots)

April 4	Swift Current Broncos	2–3	Medicine Hat Tigers	Co-op Place	Recap
No scoring		First period	10:15 - Markus Ruck (1)
Connor Dale (2) - sh - 10:07; Hunter Mayo (1) - pp - 12:51		Second period	6:57 - Shaeffer Gordon-Carroll (1); 13:44 - Ryder Ritchie (4)
No scoring		Third period	No scoring
Reid Dyck (36 saves / 39 shots)		Goalie stats	Harrison Meneghin (25 saves / 27 shots)

Medicine Hat wins series 4 – 1

==== (2) Prince Albert Raiders vs. (7) Edmonton Oil Kings ====
March 28	Edmonton Oil Kings	3–1	Prince Albert Raiders	Art Hauser Centre	Recap
Gracyn Sawchyn (1) – sh – 0:29		First period	18:34 – Nial Crocker (1)
Landon Hanson (1) – 9:03		Second period	No scoring
Gracyn Sawchyn (2) – en – 18:23		Third period	No scoring
Alex Worthington (31 saves / 32 shots)		Goalie stats	Max Hildebrand (37 saves / 39 shots)

March 29	Edmonton Oil Kings	1–6	Prince Albert Raiders	Art Hauser Centre	Recap
No scoring		First period	19:24 – Justice Christensen (1)
Lukas Sawchyn (1) – pp – 6:01		Second period	2:35 – Rilen Kovacevic (1); 9:37 – pp – Niall Crocker (2)
No scoring		Third period	3:04 – Niall Crocker (3); 7:48 – Aiden Oiring (1); 12:25 – pp – Lukas Dragicevic (1)
Alex Worthington (20 saves / 26 shots)		Goalie stats	Max Hildebrand (42 saves / 43 shots)

April 1	Prince Albert Raiders	2–3	Edmonton Oil Kings	Rogers Place	Recap
Riley Boychuk (1) – pp – 5:34		First period	14:49 – pp – Gavin Hodnett (1); 18:34 – Marshall Finnie (1)
No scoring		Second period	No scoring
Aiden Oiring (2) – 7:10		Third period	16:15 – pp – Ethan MacKenzie (1)
Max Hildebrand (30 saves / 33 shots)		Goalie stats	Ethan Simcoe (18 saves / 20 shots)

April 2	Prince Albert Raiders	2–3	Edmonton Oil Kings	Rogers Place	Recap
No scoring		First period	11:53 – Lukas Sawchyn (2)
No scoring		Second period	1:09 – pp – Gavin Hodnett (2); 4:48 – Adam Jecho (1)
Rilen Kovacevic (2) – sh – 10:22; Niall Crocker (4) – 17:15		Third period	No scoring
Max Hildebrand (17 saves / 20 shots)		Goalie stats	Ethan Simcoe (30 saves / 32 shots)

April 4	Edmonton Oil Kings	2–4	Prince Albert Raiders	Art Hauser Centre	Recap
No scoring		First period	6:17 – Tomas Mrsic (1); 16:58 – pp – Lukas Dragicevic (2)
Ethan MacKenzie (2) – pp – 11:59; Landon Hanson (2) – 18:27		Second period	16:23 – Lukas Dragicevic (3)
No scoring		Third period	18:48 – en – Aiden Oiring
Ethan Simcoe (22 saves / 25 shots)		Goalie stats	Max Hildebrand (36 saves / 38 shots)

April 6	Prince Albert Raiders	4–3	Edmonton Oil Kings	Rogers Place	Recap
No scoring		First period	17:46 – pp – Marshall Finnie (2)
Aiden Oiring (4) – pp – 8:34		Second period	No scoring
Rilen Kovacevic (3) – sh – 0:58; Aiden Oiring (5) – 6:19; Lukas Dragicevic (4) – pp – 19:07		Third period	6:32 – Rylen Roersma (1); 7:33 – Landon Hanson (3)
Max Hildebrand (30 saves / 33 shots)		Goalie stats	Ethan Simcoe (19 saves / 23 shots)

April 8	Edmonton Oil Kings	0–5	Prince Albert Raiders	Art Hauser Centre	Recap
No scoring		First period	7:40 – Aiden Oiring (6); 13:43 – Ty Meunier (1)
No scoring		Second period	18:32 – Lukas Dragicevic (5)
No scoring		Third period	10:44 – pp – Niall Crocker (5); 14:29 – pp – Rilen Kovacevic (4)
Ethan Simcoe (18 saves / 23 shots)		Goalie stats	Max Hildebrand (30 saves / 30 shots)

Prince Albert wins series 4 – 3

==== (3) Calgary Hitmen vs. (6) Saskatoon Blades ====
March 28	Saskatoon Blades	2–4	Calgary Hitmen	Scotiabank Saddledome	Recap
No scoring		First period	4:26 – sh – Ethan Moore (1)
Grayden Siepmann (1) – 5:16		Second period	16:42 – Oliver Tulk (1)
Hunter Laing (1) – 10:48		Third period	7:58 – pp – Ethan Moore (2); 10:23 – Ben Kindel (1)
Evan Gardner (40 saves / 44 shots)		Goalie stats	Anders Miller (15 saves / 17 shots)

March 30	Saskatoon Blades	1–5	Calgary Hitmen	Scotiabank Saddledome	Recap
No scoring		First period	10:03 – Brandon Gorzynski (1); 12:20 – pp – Ethan Moore (1)
No scoring		Second period	7:34 – pp – Carson Wetsch (1); 11:50 – Kalem Parker (1)
Grayden Siepmann (2) – 10:27		Third period	18:13 – en – Tanner Howe (1)
Evan Gardner (33 saves / 37 shots); Ethan McCallum (10 saves / 10 shots)		Goalie stats	Anders Miller (22 saves / 23 shots)

April 1	Calgary Hitmen	4–1	Saskatoon Blades	SaskTel Centre	Recap
David Adaszynski (1) – 19:07		First period	No scoring
Tanner Howe (2) – 11:22; Ben Kindel (2) – 12:47		Second period	2:31 – pp – David Lewandowski (1)
Connor Hvidston (1) – 11:33		Third period	No scoring
Anders Miller (20 saves / 21 shots)		Goalie stats	Evan Gardner (26 saves / 30 shots)

April 2	Calgary Hitmen	6–2	Saskatoon Blades	SaskTel Centre	Recap
No scoring		First period	No scoring
David Adaszynski (2) – 0:38; Ben Kindel (3) – 1:15; Carter Yakemchuk (1) – 6:19; Ben Kindel (4) – 10:20		Second period	9:25 – Zach Olsen (1); 10:09 – Hayden Harsanyi (1)
Oliver Tulk (2) – 9:26; Ben Kindel (5) – sh, en – 17:58		Third period	No scoring
Anders Miller (27 saves / 29 shots)		Goalie stats	Evan Gardner (30 saves / 35 shots)

Calgary wins series 4 – 0

==== (4) Lethbridge Hurricanes vs. (5) Brandon Wheat Kings ====
March 28	Brandon Wheat Kings	3–6	Lethbridge Hurricanes	VisitLethbridge.com Arena	Recap
Nolan Flamand (1) – 13:40		First period	4:28 – pp – Leo Braillard (1); 13:22 – Vojtech Port (1)
Roger McQueen (1) – pp – 5:19; Dylan Ronald (1) – 14:15		Second period	1:50 – Shane Smith (1); 2:03 – Anthony Wilson (1); 19:47 – Koper Gizowski (1)
No scoring		Third period	7:24 – Leo Braillard (2)
Carson Bjarnason (37 saves / 43 shots); Ethan Eskit (3 saves / 3 shots)		Goalie stats	Jackson Unger (32 saves / 35 shots)

March 29	Brandon Wheat Kings	3–4	Lethbridge Hurricanes	VisitLethbridge.com Arena	Recap
No scoring		First period	No scoring
Matteo Michels (1) – 3:41; Marcus Nguyen (1) – pp – 5:39		Second period	0:55 – pp – Brayden Yager (1); 7:21 – Brayden Yager (2); 10:06 – Miguel Marques (1)
Nicholas Johnson (1) – 15:55		Third period	8:46 – Carsen Adair (1)
Carson Bjarnason (22 saves / 26 shots)		Goalie stats	Jackson Unger (25 saves / 28 shots)

April 1	Lethbridge Hurricanes	3–1	Brandon Wheat Kings	Tundra Oil & Gas Place	Recap
Carsen Adair (2) – 1:56; Leo Braillard (3) – 8:22		First period	No scoring
No scoring		Second period	6:35 – pp – Nolan Flamand (2)
Miguel Marques (2) – en – 18:20		Third period	No scoring
Jackson Unger (37 saves / 38 shots)		Goalie stats	Carson Bjarnason (21 saves / 23 shots)

April 2	Lethbridge Hurricanes	4–6	Brandon Wheat Kings	Tundra Oil & Gas Place	Recap
Brayden Edwards (1) – 16:08		First period	8:24 – Luke Shipley (1); 19:50 – Matteo Michels (2)
Brayden Yager (3) – sh – 2:35		Second period	6:14 – Nolan Flamand (3); 19:50 – Matteo Michels (3)
Shane Smith (2) – 0:23; Jordan Gustafson (1) – 3:20		Third period	13:45 – Nicholas Johnson (2); 19:51 – en – Quinn Mantei (1)
Jackson Unger (26 saves / 31 shots)		Goalie stats	Ethan Eskit (38 saves / 42 shots)

April 4	Brandon Wheat Kings	2–5	Lethbridge Hurricanes	VisitLethbridge.com Arena	Recap
Quinn Mantei (2) – 6:04; Joby Baumuller (1) – 16:59		First period	4:28 – pp – Brayden Yager (4)
No scoring		Second period	3:07 – Jordan Gustafson (2)
No scoring		Third period	0:33 – pp – Noah Chadwick (1); 2:51 – Logan McCutcheon (1); 17:33 – en – Brayden Edwards (2)
Ethan Eskit (47 saves / 51 shots)		Goalie stats	Jackson Unger (24 saves / 26 shots)

Lethbridge wins series 4 – 1

=== Western conference ===
==== (1) Everett Silvertips vs. (8) Seattle Thunderbirds ====
March 28	Seattle Thunderbirds	3–2	Everett Silvertips	Angel of the Winds Arena	Recap
Hayden Pakkala (1) - pp - 3:41; Brayden Holberton (1) - 10:05		First period	8:46 - Shea Busch (1)
Simon Lovsin (1) - 1:54		Second period	No scoring
No scoring		Third period	8:15 - pp - Tarin Smith (1)
Scott Ratzlaff (45 saves / 47 shots)		Goalie stats	Raiden LeGall (31 saves / 34 shots)

March 29	Seattle Thunderbirds	2–3	OT	Everett Silvertips	Angel of the Winds Arena	Recap
No scoring		First period		13:49 - Lukas Kaplan (1)
Braeden Cootes (1) - pp - 16:38		Second period		No scoring
Nathan Pilling (1) - 19:30		Third period		12:37 - Austin Roest (1)
No scoring		First overtime period		7:33 - Eric Jamieson (1)
Scott Ratzlaff (44 saves / 47 shots)		Goalie stats		Jesse Sanche (33 saves / 35 shots)

April 1	Everett Silvertips	3–6	Seattle Thunderbirds	accesso ShoWare Center	Recap
Shea Busch (2) - 2:18		First period	2:11 - pp - Brayden Schuurman (1)
Austin Roest (2) - 3:56; Dominik Rymon (1) - pp - 7:59		Second period	9:23 - Nathan Pilling (2); 15:21 - Ashton Cumby (1); 17:13 - Simon Lovsin (2)
No scoring		Third period	5:29 - Antonio Martorana (1); 13:43 - Simon Lovsin (3)
Jesse Sanche (34 saves / 40 shots)		Goalie stats	Scott Ratzlaff (40 saves / 43 shots)

April 4	Everett Silvertips	6–2	Seattle Thunderbirds	accesso ShoWare Center	Recap
No scoring		First period	4:08 - Simon Lovsin (4)
Julius Miettinen (1) - 5:51; Julius Miettinen (2) - 15:37		Second period	No scoring
Dominik Rymon (2) - 2:10; Jaxsin Vaughan (1) - 3:35; Shea Busch (3) - 4:34; Rylan Pearce (1) - pp - 10:44		Third period	7:10 - pp - Nathan Pilling (3)
Raiden LeGall (33 saves / 35 shots)		Goalie stats	Scott Ratzlaff (38 saves / 44 shots)

April 5	Seattle Thunderbirds	4–7	Everett Silvertips	Angel of the Winds Arena	Recap
Brayden Schuurman (2) - 1:08		First period	16:44 - pp - Kaden Hammell (1); 19:12 - pp - Austin Roest (3); 19:41 - pp - Zackary Shantz (1); 19:56 - Julius Miettinen (3)
Brayden Schuurman (3) - pp - 2:46; Brayden Schuurman (4) - 17:49		Second period	17:16 - pp - Shea Busch (4)
Braeden Cootes (2) - pp - 16:15		Third period	12:16 - pp - Shea Busch (5); 13:54 - Austin Roest (4)
Scott Ratzlaff (36 saves / 43 shots)		Goalie stats	Raiden LeGall (34 saves / 38 shots)

April 7	Everett Silvertips	1–0	2OT	Seattle Thunderbirds	accesso ShoWare Center	Recap
No scoring		First period		No scoring
No scoring		Second period		No scoring
No scoring		Third period		No scoring
Lukas Kaplan (2) - 13:43		Second overtime period		No scoring
Raiden LeGall (57 saves / 57 shots)		Goalie stats		Scott Ratzlaff (47 saves / 48 shots)

Everett wins series 4 – 2

==== (2) Victoria Royals vs. (7) Tri-City Americans ====
March 28	Tri-City Americans	0–3	Victoria Royals	Save-On-Foods Memorial Centre	Recap
No scoring		First period	No scoring
No scoring		Second period	13:30 – pp – Brandon Lisowsky (1)
No scoring		Third period	10:26 – Brandon Lisowsky (2); 16:44 – Cole Reschny (1)
Lukas Matecha (21 saves / 24 shots)		Goalie stats	Johnny Hicks (22 saves / 22 shots)

March 29	Tri-City Americans	2–6	Victoria Royals	Save-On-Foods Memorial Centre	Recap
No scoring		First period	16:15 – Nolan Stewart (1)
Jake Sloan (1) – pp – 6:57; Brandon Whynott (1) – pp – 16:18		Second period	1:30 – Kenta Isogai (1); 4:24 – Cole Reschny (2); 14:45 – pp – Teydon Trembecky (1)
No scoring		Third period	11:03 – Keaton Verhoeff (1); 16:21 – sh – en – Cole Reschny (3)
Lukas Matecha (27 saves / 32 shots)		Goalie stats	Johnny Hicks (29 saves / 31 shots)

April 1	Victoria Royals	3–1	Tri-City Americans	Toyota Center	Recap
No scoring		First period	No scoring
Seth Fryer (1) – 9:30		Second period	11:31 – Brandon Whynott (2)
Justin Kipkie (1) – pp – 6:11; Brandon Lisowsky (3) – en – 18:42		Third period	No scoring
Johnny Hicks (31 saves / 32 shots)		Goalie stats	Lukas Matecha (39 saves / 41 shots)

April 2	Victoria Royals	4–6	Tri-City Americans	Toyota Center	Recap
Cole Reschny (4) – pp – 15:05		First period	2:01 – Jake Gudelj (1); 12:43 – Grady Martin (1)
Kent Isogai (2) – 4:14; Markus Loponen (1) – 9:08		Second period	4:40 – Savin Virk (1); 5:26 – Jackson Smith (1); 14:00 – Cash Koch (1)
Markus Loponen (2) – 4:25		Third period	5:33 – Max Curran (1)
Johnny Hicks (14 saves / 18 shots); Jayden Kraus (14 saves / 16 shots)		Goalie stats	Lukas Matecha (40 saves / 44 shots)

April 4	Victoria Royals	7–0	Tri-City Americans	Toyota Center	Recap
Wyatt Danyleyko (1) – 5:25; Brayden Boehm (1) – 9:26; Teydon Trembecky (2) – 16:32		First period	No scoring
Kent Isogai (3) – 0:58; Brandon Lisowsky (4) – pp – 4:10		Second period	No scoring
Brayden Boehm (2) – pp – 15:09; Jerrett Ross (1) – 19:43		Third period	No scoring
Johnny Hicks (35 saves / 35 shots)		Goalie stats	Lukas Matecha (34 saves / 41 shots)

Victoria wins series 4 – 1

==== (3) Spokane Chiefs vs. (6) Vancouver Giants ====
March 28	Spokane Chiefs	4–1	Vancouver Giants	Langley Events Centre	Recap
No scoring		First period	13:44 – pp – Jaden Lipinski (1)
Sam Oremba (1) – 2:00; Assanali Sarkenov (1) – 15:19		Second period	No scoring
Andrew Cristall (1) – 6:47; Andrew Cristall (2) – en – 18:15		Third period	No scoring
Dawson Cowan (25 saves / 26 shots)		Goalie stats	Burke Hood (40 saves / 43 shots)

March 30	Spokane Chiefs	7–5	Vancouver Giants	Langley Events Centre	Recap
Mathis Preston (1) – 19:11		First period	No scoring
Mathis Preston (2) – 0:29; Shea Van Olm (1) – 2:14; Mathis Preston (3) – 5:52; Cameron Parr (1) – 6:21		Second period	No scoring
Berkly Catton (1) – 0:43; Berkly Catton (2) – sh – en – 19:52		Third period	1:02 – Adam Titlbach (1); 4:26 – Connor Levis (1); 5:02 – Cameron Schmidt (1); 12:06 – Colton Roberts (1); 16:50 – pp – Tyler Thorpe (1)
Dawson Cowan (32 saves / 37 shots)		Goalie stats	Burke Hood (26 saves / 30 shots); Brady Smith (24 saves / 26 shots)

April 2	Vancouver Giants	3–2	Spokane Chiefs	Spokane Arena	Recap
Ty Halaburda (1) – 1:17; London Hoilett (1) – 7:01		First period	19:23 – Saige Weinstein (1)
No scoring		Second period	9:21 – Rasmus Ekström (1)
Connor Levis (2) – 10:21		Third period	No scoring
Burke Hoode (41 saves / 43 shots)		Goalie stats	Dawson Cowan (19 saves / 22 shots)

April 3	Vancouver Giants	2–6	Spokane Chiefs	Spokane Arena	Recap
Maxim Muranov (1) – 4:48		First period	5:07 – Andrew Cristall (3); 5:21 – Chase Harrington (1); 16:34 – pp – Andrew Cristall (4)
No scoring		Second period	1:52 – pp – Mathis Preston (4); 3:43 – pp – Andrew Cristall (5); 7:15 – Chase Harrington (2)
Cameron Schmidt (2) – pp – 5:10		Third period	No scoring
Burke Hood (13 saves / 19 shots); Brady Smith (14 saves / 14 shots)		Goalie stats	Dawson Cowan (21 saves / 23 shots)

April 5	Vancouver Giants	4–9	Spokane Chiefs	Spokane Arena	Recap
Cameron Schmidt (3) – 1:01; Cameron Schmidt (4) – 7:30		First period	4:35 – pp – Andrew Cristall (6); 10:58 – Berkly Catton (3); 11:25 Shea Van Olm (2); 14:30 – Shea Van Olm (3)
No scoring		Second period	1:31 – Shea Van Olm (4); 5:37 – pp – Rasmus Ekström (2); 6:49 – Assanali Sarkenov (2)
Maxim Muranov (2) – 1:47; Jaden Lipinski (2) – 5:32		Third period	0:59 – Andrew Cristall (7); 13:12 – en – Berkly Catton (4)
Burke Hood (12 saves / 18 shots); Brady Smith (14 saves / 16 shots)		Goalie stats	Dawson Cowan (24 saves / 28 shots)

Spokane wins series 4 – 1

==== (4) Prince George Cougars vs. (5) Portland Winterhawks ====
March 28	Portland Winterhawks	6–7	OT	Prince George Cougars	CN Centre	Recap
Josh Zakreski (1) – 1:21; Carter Sotheran (1) – 14:28; Josh Zakreski (2) – 17:29		First period		16:32 – Borya Valis (1)
Alex Weiermair (1) – 2:45; Diego Buttazzoni (1) – pp – 8:01		Second period		6:36 – Matteo Danis (1)
Joel Plante (1) – 16:52		Third period		1:03 – Riley Heidt (1); 7:09 – Terik Parascak (1); 7:50 – Matteo Danis (2); 12:20 – Bauer Dumanski (1)
No scoring		First overtime period		6:40 – Terik Parascak (2)
Ondrej Štěbeták (29 saves / 36 shots)		Goalie stats		Joshua Ravensbergen (15 saves / 19 shots); Cooper Michaluk (23 saves / 25 shots)

March 29	Portland Winterhawks	5–2	Prince George Cougars	CN Centre	Recap
Diego Buttazzoni (2) – 4:36; Jordan Duguay (1) – 17:12		First period	8:55 – Evan Groening (1)
Kyle Chyzowski (1) – pp – 8:32		Second period	13:08 – Viliam Kmec (1)
Diego Buttazzoni (3) – 17:02; Tyson Jugnauth (1) – en – 18:24		Third period	No scoring
Ondrej Štěbeták (28 saves / 30 shots)		Goalie stats	Joshua Ravensbergen (28 saves / 32 shots)

April 1	Prince George Cougars	3–6	Portland Winterhawks	Veterans Memorial Coliseum	Recap
Bauer Dumanski (2) – 19:07		First period	4:10 – Alex Weiermair (2); 9:33 –pp – Alex Weiermair (3)
Jett Lajoie (1) – 4:18		Second period	3:42 – Tyson Jugnauth (2); 10:08 – Carter Sotheran (2); 16:29 – Carter Sotheran (3)
Lee Shurgot (1) – 6:51		Third period	17:08 – pp – Alex Weiermair (4)
Joshua Ravensbergen (39 saves / 45 shots)		Goalie stats	Ondrej Štěbeták (25 saves / 28 shots)

April 2	Prince George Cougars	4–5	2OT	Portland Winterhawks	Veterans Memorial Coliseum	Recap
Borya Valis (2) – 17:35		First period		2:16 – pp – Carter Sotheran (4); 18:50 – Kyle Chyzowski (2)
Matteo Danis (3) – pp – 18:13		Second period		No scoring
Koehn Ziemmer (1) – pp – 6:38; Carson Carels (1) – pp – 18:06		Third period		2:37 – pp – Hudson Darby (1); 19:36 – Ryan Miller (1)
No scoring		Second overtime period		17:57 – Diego Buttazzoni (4)
Joshua Ravensbergen (51 saves / 56 shots)		Goalie stats		Ondrej Štěbeták (49 saves / 53 shots)

April 4	Prince George Cougars	7–2	Portland Winterhawks	Veterans Memorial Coliseum	Recap
Riley Heidt (2) – 9:01; Matteo Danis (4) – 14:59		First period	16:04 – Ryder Thompson (1)
Koehn Ziemmer (2) – 14:43		Second period	No scoring
Matteo Danis (5) – 0:12; Terik Parascak (3) – 7:59; Borya Valis (3) – 8:39; Koehn Ziemmer (3) – 17:42		Third period	6:24 – pp – Alex Weiermair (5)
Joshua Ravensbergen (38 saves / 40 shots)		Goalie stats	Ondrej Štěbeták (32 saves / 39 shots)

April 6	Portland Winterhawks	1–4	Prince George Cougars	CN Centre	Recap
No scoring		First period	No scoring
Kyle Chyzowski (3) – sh – 8:59		Second period	5:56 – Riley Heidt (3)
No scoring		Third period	6:55 – Riley Heidt (4); 12:09 – Ben Riche (1); 18:52 – en – Riley Heidt (5)
Ondrej Štěbeták (24 saves / 27 shots)		Goalie stats	Joshua Ravensbergen (26 saves / 27 shots)

April 7	Portland Winterhawks	4–2	Prince George Cougars	CN Centre	Recap
Alex Weiermair (6) – 12:14		First period	6:24 – Terik Parascak (4)
Kyle Chyzowski (4) – 8:43		Second period	No scoring
Josh Zakreski (3) – 10:12; Diego Buttazzoni (5) – en – 19:50		Third period	5:14 – Lee Shurgot (2)
Ondrej Štěbeták (33 saves / 35 shots)		Goalie stats	Joshua Ravensbergen (19 saves / 22 shots)

Portland wins series 4 – 3

== Conference semifinals ==
=== Eastern conference ===
==== (1) Medicine Hat Tigers vs. (2) Prince Albert Raiders ====
April 12	Prince Albert Raiders	4–6	Medicine Hat Tigers	Co-op Place	Recap
Evan Smith (1) – 10:06		First period	16:25 – Liam Ruck (1)
No scoring		Second period	8:00 – pp – Oasiz Wiesblatt (8); 10:27 – pp – Gavin McKenna (3); 14:50 – Josh Van Mulligen (2); 16:41 – pp – Ryder Ritchie (5)
Daxon Rudolph (1) – pp – 5:15; Dayce Derkatch (1) – 9:36; Brayden Dube (1) – 15:52		Third period	15:27 – Misha Volotovskii (1)
Max Hildebrand (30 saves / 35 shots); Dimitri Fortin (3 saves / 4 shots)		Goalie stats	Jordan Switzer (16 saves / 20 shots)

April 13	Prince Albert Raiders	4–5	OT	Medicine Hat Tigers	Co-op Place	Recap
No scoring		First period		16:24 – pp – Oasiz Wiesblatt (9)
No scoring		Second period		6:51 – sh – Gavin McKenna (4)
Linden Burrett (1) – 9:46; Harrison Lodewyk (1) – pp – 12:17; Rilen Kovacevic (5) – pp – 18:23; Rilen Kovacevic – 18:58		Third period		10:58 – Mathew Ward (1); 17:45 – sh – Gavin McKenna (5)
No scoring		First overtime period		8:50 – pp – Liam Ruck (2)
Max Hildebrand (42 saves / 47 shots)		Goalie stats		Jordan Switzer (27 saves / 31 shots)

April 16	Medicine Hat Tigers	6–1	Prince Albert Raiders	Art Hauser Centre	Recap
Hunter St. Martin (3) – 0:58		First period	No scoring
Mathew Ward (2) – 1:22; Veeti Väisänen (1) – pp – 14:04; Tanner Molendyk (1) – 15:19		Second period	19:39 – Lukas Dragicevic (6)
Gavin McKenna (6) – 1:16; Ryder Ritchie (6) – 5:12		Third period	No scoring
Harrison Meneghin (21 saves / 22 shots)		Goalie stats	Max Hildebrand (16 saves / 21 shots); Dimitri Fortin (7 saves / 8 shots)

April 17	Medicine Hat Tigers	3–0	Prince Albert Raiders	Art Hauser Centre	Recap
No scoring		First period	No scoring
Tanner Molendyk (2) – pp – 4:03; Oasiz Wiesblatt (10) – 10:40		Second period	No scoring
Hunter St. Martin (4) – 0:59		Third period	No scoring
Harrison Meneghin (18 saves / 18 shots)		Goalie stats	Max Hildebrand (54 saves / 57 shots)

Medicine Hat wins series 4 – 0

==== (3) Calgary Hitmen vs. (4) Lethbridge Hurricanes ====
April 10	Lethbridge Hurricanes	4–0	Calgary Hitmen	Scotiabank Saddledome	Recap
Kooper Gizowski (2) – 4:25; Brayden Edwards (3) – 13:14		First period	No scoring
Logan Wormald (1) – pp – 4:00		Second period	No scoring
Noah Chadwick (2) – pp – 14:52		Third period	No scoring
Jackson Unger (33 saves / 33 shots)		Goalie stats	Daniel Hauser (20 saves / 24 shots)

April 12	Lethbridge Hurricanes	2–1	Calgary Hitmen	Scotiabank Saddledome	Recap
No scoring		First period	No scoring
Brayden Edwards (4) – pp – 14:22		Second period	No scoring
Kooper Gizowski (3) – 17:45		Third period	16:56 – Ben Kindel (6)
Jackson Unger (33 saves / 34 shots)		Goalie stats	Anders Miller (25 saves / 27 shots)

April 15	Calgary Hitmen	5–3	Lethbridge Hurricanes	VisitLethbridge.com Arena	Recap
No scoring		First period	No scoring
Carson Wetsch (2) – 6:16; David Adaszynski (3) – 14:38		Second period	10:06 – Trae Johnson (1)
Alex Hurtig (1) – 10:22; Carson Wetsch (3) – en – 18:41; Carson Wetsch (4) – en – 19:59		Third period	6:21 – Shane Smith (3); 19:21 – Caden Price (1)
Anders Miller (26 saves / 29 shots)		Goalie stats	Jackson Unger (18 saves / 21 shots)

April 16	Calgary Hitmen	3–2	OT	Lethbridge Hurricanes	VisitLethbridge.com Arena	Recap
Oliver Tulk (3) – 3:13		First period		8:30 – pp – Noah Chadwick (3)
Brandon Gorzynski (2) – pp – 16:04		Second period		No scoring
No scoring		Third period		5:18 – Trae Johnson (2)
Ben Kindel (7) – 6:08		First overtime period		No scoring
Anders Miller (32 saves / 34 shots)		Goalie stats		Jackson Unger (21 saves / 24 shots)

April 18	Lethbridge Hurricanes	5–6	OT	Calgary Hitmen	Scotiabank Saddledome	Recap
Miguel Marques – 4:31; Jordan Gustafson (3) – 12:37		First period		11:12 – Carter Yakemchuk (2); 18:02 – Brandon Gorzynski (3)
Brayden Yager (5) – 8:02; Logan Wormald (2) – 8:45; Lorgan Wormald (3) – sh – 18:49		Second period		19:17 – pp – Connor Hvidston (2)
No scoring		Third period		6:05 – Carson Wetsch (5); 13:18 – Oliver Tulk (4)
No scoring		First overtime period		6:09 – Ben Kindel (8)
Jackson Unger (22 saves / 28 shots)		Goalie stats		Anders Miller (26 saves / 31 shots)

April 19	Calgary Hitmen	1–5	Lethbridge Hurricanes	VisitLethbridge.com Arena	Recap
No scoring		First period	No scoring
No scoring		Second period	7:58 – pp – Noah Chadwick (4); 13:45 – Brayden Yager (6); 18:37 – Noah Chadwick (5); 18:57 – Caden Price (2)
Brandon Gorzynski (4) – 16:33		Third period	17:12 – Brayden Edwards (5)
Anders Miller (15 saves / 19 shots); Eric Tu (6 saves / 7 shots)		Goalie stats	Jackson Unger (21 saves / 22 shots)

April 23	Lethbridge Hurricanes	3–1	Calgary Hitmen	Scotiabank Saddledome	Recap
Brayden Edwards (6) – 3:22; Logan Wormald (4) – 17:32		First period	12:48 – David Adaszynski (4)
No scoring		Second period	No scoring
Luke Cozens (1) – 3:33		Third period	No scoring
Jackson Unger (34 saves / 35 shots)		Goalie stats	Anders Miller (22 saves / 25 shots)

Lethbridge wins series 4 – 3

=== Western conference ===
==== (1) Everett Silvertips vs. (5) Portland Winterhawks ====
April 11	Portland Winterhawks	2–3	OT	Everett Silvertips	Angel of the Winds Arena	Recap
Tyson Jugnauth (3) – 8:42		First period		No scoring
No scoring		Second period		13:14 – pp – Austin Roest (5)
Carter Sotheran (3) – 14:23		Third period		2:16 – Tarin Smith (2)
No scoring		First overtime period		1:34 – Jesse Heslop (1)
Ondrej Štěbeták (40 saves / 43 shots)		Goalie stats		Raiden LeGall (30 saves / 32 shots)

April 12	Portland Winterhawks	3–4	OT	Everett Silvertips	Angel of the Winds Arena	Recap
No scoring		First period		16:49 – Landon DuPont (1)
Hudson Darby (2) – 6:03; Josh Zakreski (4) – 8:38		Second period		No scoring
Kyle Chyzowski (5) – 13:37		Third period		2:19 – Austin Roest (6); 9:24 – pp – Dominik Rymon (3)
No scoring		First overtime period		5:46 – Julius Miettinen (4)
Ondrej Štěbeták (45 saves / 49 shots)		Goalie stats		Raiden LeGall (35 saves / 38 shots)

April 15	Everett Silvertips	1–2	Portland Winterhawks	Veterans Memorial Coliseum	Recap
No scoring		First period	0:15 – Ryan Miller (2); 8:44 – pp – Diego Buttazzoni (6)
No scoring		Second period	No scoring
Tarin Smith (3) – 3:27		Third period	19:52 – en – Carter Sotheran (6)
Raiden LeGall (28 saves / 30 shots)		Goalie stats	Ondrej Štěbeták (33 saves / 34 shots)

April 16	Everett Silvertips	5–6	OT	Portland Winterhawks	Veterans Memorial Coliseum	Recap
Tyler MacKenzie (1) – pp – 8:07		First period		3:16 – Kyle Chyzowski (6); 9:39 – Kyle Chyzowski (7)
Landon DuPont (2) – pp – 14:27		Second period		11:19 – pp – Diego Buttazzoni (7); 18:14 – Kyle Chyzowski (8)
Cole Temple (1) – 4:22; Kaden Hammell (2) – 15:47; Kaden Hammell (3) – pp – 18:59		Third period		7:30 – pp – Kayd Ruedig (1)
No scoring		First overtime period		15:49 – Josh Zakreski (5)
Raiden LeGall (25 saves / 31 shots)		Goalie stats		Ondrej Štěbeták (43 saves / 48 shots)

April 18	Portland Winterhawks	4–3	Everett Silvertips	Angel of the Winds Arena	Recap
Josh Zakreski (6) – pp – 12:53		First period	16:19 – pp – Landon DuPont (3)
Kyle Chyzowski (9) – 14:10		Second period	16:09 – Kaden Hammell (4)
Alex Weiermair (7) – 0:30; Hudson Darby (3) – 19:00		Third period	6:43 – Julius Miettinen (5)
Ondrej Štěbeták (36 saves / 39 shots)		Goalie stats	Raiden LeGall (32 saves / 36 shots)

April 19	Everett Silvertips	8–4	Portland Winterhawks	Veterans Memorial Coliseum	Recap
Lukas Kaplan (3) – 0:44; Julius Miettinen (6) – 15:12; Landon DuPont (4) – pp – 19:43		First period	17:06 – Kyle McDonough (1)
Jesse Heslop (2) – 0:30; Tyler MacKenzie (2) – 1:31; Austin Roest (7) – 11:18; Tarin Smith (4) – 14:40		Second period	7:10 – Alex Weiermair (8); 9:14 – pp – Diego Buttazzoni (8); 18:40 – Kyle Chyzowski (10)
Shea Busch (6) – 0:50		Third period	No scoring
Jesse Sanche (23 saves / 27 shots)		Goalie stats	Ondrej Štěbeták (10 saves / 15 shots); Marek Schlenker (20 saves / 23 shots)

April 22	Portland Winterhawks	4–2	Everett Silvertips	Angel of the Winds Arena	Recap
No scoring		First period	No scoring
Kyle Chyzowski (11) – 19:21		Second period	9:57 – Landon DuPont (5)
Hudson Darby (4) – 7:37; Kyle McDonough (2) – 8:07; Diego Buttazzoni – pp, en – 19:39		Third period	3:03 – Lukas Kaplan (4)
Ondrej Štěbeták (40 saves / 42 shots)		Goalie stats	Raiden LeGall (29 saves / 32 shots)

Portland wins series 4 – 3

==== (2) Victoria Royals vs. (3) Spokane Chiefs ====
April 13	Victoria Royals	3–4	2OT	Spokane Chiefs	Spokane Arena	Recap
Cole Reschny (5) – 19:35		First period		No scoring
Cole Reschny (6) – 5:38		Second period		14:31 – Cameron Parr (2)
Teydon Trembecky (3) – 3:26		Third period		2:09 – Sam Oremba (2); 12:11 – Andrew Cristall (8)
No scoring		Second overtime period		10:35 – pp – Rasmus Ekström (3)
Johnny Hicks (53 saves / 57 shots)		Goalie stats		Dawson Cowan (32 saves / 35 shots)

April 14	Victoria Royals	5–1	Spokane Chiefs	Spokane Arena	Recap
Kenta Isogai (4) – 14:11		First period	No scoring
Justin Kipkie (2) – pp – 6:17; Markus Loponen (3) – pp – 10:48		Second period	19:32 – Berkly Catton (5)
Brayden Boehm (3) – pp – 6:03; Reggie Newman (1) – 11:14		Third period	No scoring
Johnny Hicks (40 saves / 41 shots)		Goalie stats	Carter Esler (16 saves / 21 shots)

April 16	Spokane Chiefs	3–4	Victoria Royals	Save-On-Foods Memorial Centre	Recap
Andrew Cristall (9) – 16:18		First period	9:40 – Teydon Trembecky (4); 12:16 – pp – Cole Reschny (7); 13:10 – Teydon Trembecky (5)
No scoring		Second period	No scoring
Andrew Cristall (10) – 6:49; Chase Harrington (3) – 15:07		Third period	19:30 – pp – Teydon Trembecky (6)
Dawson Cowan (29 saves / 33 shots)		Goalie stats	Jayden Kraus (46 saves / 49 shots)

April 18	Spokane Chiefs	9–6	Victoria Royals	Save-On-Foods Memorial Centre	Recap
Nathan Mayes (1) – 7:41; Owen Martin (1) – 11:39; Mathis Preston (5) – 12:24; Rasmus Ekström (4) – 14:01; Andrew Cristall (11) – 15:45		First period	No scoring
Rasmus Ekström (5) – pp – 12:43; Rasmus Ekström (6) – pp – 13:01		Second period	11:22 – pp – Teydon Trembecky (7); 19:49 – Caleb Matthews (1)
Mathis Preston (6) – pp – 3:06; Berkly Catton (6) – 10:06		Third period	2:18 – sh – Hayden Moore (1); 5:22 – pp – Brandon Lisowsky (5); 7:39 – Teydon Trembecky (8); 15:41 – pp – Cole Reschny (8)
Dawson Cowan (12 saves / 18 shots)		Goalie stats	Johnny Hicks (8 saves / 11 shots); Jayden Kraus (29 saves / 35 shots)

April 19	Spokane Chiefs	5–4	OT	Victoria Royals	Save-On-Foods Memorial Centre	Recap
No scoring		First period		10:49 – Reggie Newman (2)
Shea Van Olm (5) – pp – 10:21		Second period		3:19 – pp – Cole Reschny (9); 12:46 – pp – Brayden Boehm (4); 18:57 – Kenta Isogai (5)
Owen Martin (2) – 1:42; Shea Van Olm (6) – 2:58; Berkly Catton (7) – 16:49		Third period		No scoring
Andrew Cristall (12) – 19:58		First overtime period		No scoring
Dawson Cowan (23 saves / 27 shots)		Goalie stats		Jayden Kraus (43 saves / 48 shots)

April 22	Victoria Royals	4–5	2OT	Spokane Chiefs	Spokane Arena	Recap
Markus Loponen (4) – pp – 4:18; Teydon Trembecky (9) – 17:27		First period		8:43 – Shea Van Olm (7); 17:58 – Saige Weinstein (2)
No scoring		Second period		19:43 – Shea Van Olm (8)
Kenta Isogai (6) – 3:05; Brandon Lisowsky (6) – 16:50		Third period		1:17 – Shea Van Olm (9)
No scoring		Second overtime period		18:11 – pp – Andrew Cristall (13)
Jayden Kraus (48 saves / 53 shots)		Goalie stats		Dawson Cowan (36 saves / 40 shots)

Spokane wins series 4 – 2

== Conference finals ==
=== Eastern conference finals ===
==== (1) Medicine Hat Tigers vs. (4) Lethbridge Hurricanes ====
April 25	Lethbridge Hurricanes	2–5	Medicine Hat Tigers	Co-op Place	Recap
Logan Wormald (5) – 6:17		First period	2:17 – Shaeffer Gordon-Carroll (2); 2:23 – Gavin McKenna (7); 9:29 – Oasiz Wiesblatt (11)
Brayden Yager (7) – pp – 16:11		Second period	6:34 – Ryder Ritchie (7); 11:39 – Ethan Neutens (1)
No scoring		Third period	No scoring
Jackson Unger (21 saves / 26 shots); Koen Cleaver (15 saves / 15 shots)		Goalie stats	Harrison Meneghin (17 saves / 19 shots)

April 26	Lethbridge Hurricanes	2–7	Medicine Hat Tigers	Co-op Place	Recap
No scoring		First period	2:37 – Oasiz Wiesblatt (12); 6:08 – Bryce Pickford (4); 13:56 – Josh Van Mulligen (3)
No scoring		Second period	1:32 – pp – Liam Ruck (3); 10:02 – pp – Bryce Pickford (5); 17:39 – Misha Volotovskii (2); 19:09 – pp – Oasiz Wiesblatt (13)
Kooper Gizowski (4) – 3:46; Anthony Wilson (2) – 10:19		Third period	No scoring
Jackson Unger (14 saves / 21 shots); Koen Cleaver (8 saves / 8 shots)		Goalie stats	Harrison Meneghin (13 saves / 14 shots); Jordan Switzer (7 saves / 8 shots)

April 29	Medicine Hat Tigers	7–6	OT	Lethbridge Hurricanes	VisitLethbridge.com Arena	Recap
No scoring		First period		3:41 – pp – Kooper Gizowski (5); 11:40 – Noah Chadwick (6)
Ryder Ritchie (8) – 5:56; Liam Ruck (4) – pp – 11:53; Tanner Molendyk (3) – 14:56		Second period		5:26 – Kash Andresen (1); 8:52 – pp – Noah Chadwick (7)
Mathew Ward (3) – sh – 6:45; Kadon McCann (1) – 9:37; Bryce Pickford (6) – 18:50		Third period		1:12 – Miguel Marques; 16:41 – Brayden Yager (8)
Oasiz Wiesblatt (14) – 2:41		First overtime period		No scoring
Harrison Meneghin (21 saves / 27 shots)		Goalie stats		Jackson Unger (38 saves / 45 shots)

April 30	Medicine Hat Tigers	5–3	Lethbridge Hurricanes	VisitLethbridge.com Arena	Recap
Mathew Ward (4) – sh – 9:37; Bryce Pickford (7) – pp – 14:10		First period	2:32 – Logan Wormald (6)
Misha Volotovskii (3) – 12:20; Mathew Ward (5) – pp – 17:52		Second period	No scoring
Gavin McKenna (8) – en – 19:23		Third period	1:32 – Kash Andresen (2); 6:17 – Anthony Wilson (3)
Harrison Meneghin (18 saves / 21 shots)		Goalie stats	Jackson Unger (34 saves / 38 shots)

Medicine Hat wins series 4 – 0

=== Western conference finals ===
==== (3) Spokane Chiefs vs. (5) Portland Winterhawks ====
April 25	Portland Winterhawks	4–10	Spokane Chiefs	Spokane Arena	Recap
Tyson Jugnauth (4) – 6:00; Diego Buttazzoni (10) – 7:51; Josh Zakreski (7) – 18:38		First period	0:34 – Berkly Catton (8); 2:44 – Sam Oremba (3); 6:22 – Chase Harrington (4); 9:42 – Shea Van Olm (10); 15:52 – Assanali Sarkenov (3)
Diego Buttazzoni (11) – pp – 12:39		Second period	3:07 – Mathis Preston (7); 3:43 – Andrew Cristall (14); 10:28 – sh – Assanali Sarkenov (4)
No scoring		Third period	3:05 – Brody Gillespie (1); 10:04 – pp – Owen Martin (3)
Ondrej Štěbeták (3 saves / 7 shots); Marek Schlenker (27 saves / 33 shots)		Goalie stats	Dawson Cowan (25 saves / 29 shots)

April 27	Portland Winterhawks	5–6	OT	Spokane Chiefs	Spokane Arena	Recap
Diego Buttazzoni (12) – pp – 2:03; Josh Zakreski (8) – 11:21		First period		7:30 – Assanali Sarkenov (5)
Ryan Miller (3) – 6:22		Second period		5:01 – Andrew Cristall (15); 11:22 – pp – Andrew Cristall (16)
Max Pšenička (1) – 12:02; Kyle Chyzowski (2) – 14:35		Third period		1:14 – Andrew Cristall (17); 9:33 – Assanali Sarkenov (6)
No scoring		First overtime period		2:25 – Chase Harrington (5)
Ondrej Štěbeták (38 saves / 44 shots)		Goalie stats		Dawson Cowan (28 saves / 33 shots)

April 30	Spokane Chiefs	8–5	Portland Winterhawks	Veterans Memorial Coliseum	Recap
Chase Harrington (6) – 11:28; Nathan Mayes (2) – 18:49		First period	15:32 – pp – Josh Zakreski (9)
Owen Martin (4) – pp – 10:46; Will McIsaac (1) – 12:32; Andrew Cristall (18) – 18:51		Second period	6:39 – pp – Diego Buttazzoni (13); 14:14 – Diego Buttazzoni; 19:17 – Joel Plante (2)
Coco Armstrong (1) – 4:08; Mathis Preston (8) – 5:59; Assanali Sarkenov (7) – 8:11		Third period	2:47 – Josh Zakreski (10)
Dawson Cowan (24 saves / 29 shots)		Goalie stats	Ondrej Štěbeták (32 saves / 40 shots)

May 1	Spokane Chiefs	6–4	Portland Winterhawks	Veterans Memorial Coliseum	Recap
Andrew Cristall (19) – 7:26; Andrew Cristall (20) – pp – 16:09		First period	10:58 – Alex Weiermair (9)
Coco Armstrong (2) – 12:02		Second period	5:21 – pp – Ryan Miller (4); 16:57 – Alex Weiermair (10)
Rasmus Ekström (7) – 14:13; Owen Martin (5) – 16:49; Shean Van Olm (11) – en – 18:27		Third period	0:24 – pp – Josh Zakreski (11)
Dawson Cowan (39 saves / 43 shots)		Goalie stats	Ondrej Štěbeták (39 saves / 44 shots)

Spokane wins series 4 – 0

== WHL Championship ==
=== (E1) Medicine Hat Tigers vs. (W3) Spokane Chiefs ===
May 9	Spokane Chiefs	1–4	Medicine Hat Tigers	Co-op Place	Recap
No scoring		First period	0:54 – Andrew Basha (1); 6:27 – Bryce Pickford (8)
No scoring		Second period	No scoring
Berkly Catton (9) – pp – 4:44		Third period	5:56 – Ethan Neutens (2); 17:43 – en – Tanner Molendyk (4)
Dawson Cowan (18 saves / 21 shots)		Goalie stats	Harrison Meneghin (36 saves / 37 shots)

May 11	Spokane Chiefs	6–2	Medicine Hat Tigers	Co-op Place	Recap
Berkly Catton (10) – 6:50; Rasmus Ekström (8) – 9:31; Owen Martin (6) – 10:12; Shea Van Olm (12) – 11:36		First period	0:55 – Cayden Lindstrom (1)
No scoring		Second period	5:55 – pp – Bryce Pickford (9)
Mathis Preston (9) – 12:07; Berkly Catton (11) – 15:18		Third period	No scoring
Dawson Cowan (19 saves / 21 shots)		Goalie stats	Harrison Meneghin (19 saves / 25 shots)

May 13	Medicine Hat Tigers	6–0	Spokane Chiefs	Spokane Arena	Recap
Cayden Lindstrom (2) – 11:45; Hunter St. Martin (5) – 18:09		First period	No scoring
Kadon McCann (2) – 1:33; Liam Ruck (5) – 14:52		Second period	No scoring
Andrew Basha (2) – 0:23; Bryce Pickford (10) – pp – 9:16		Third period	No scoring
Harrison Meneghin (28 saves / 28 shots)		Goalie stats	Dawson Cowan (28 saves / 32 shots)

May 14	Medicine Hat Tigers	5–2	Spokane Chiefs	Spokane Arena	Recap
Ryder Ritchie (9) – 0:31		First period	0:49 – Assanali Sarkenov (8)
Bryce Pickford (11) – pp – 2:29; Bryce Pickford (12) – pp – 9:40; Liam Ruck (6) – pp – 11:30; Hunter St. Martin (6) – 19:30		Second period	17:30 – pp – Shea Van Olm (13)
No scoring		Third period	No scoring
Harrison Meneghin (28 saves / 30 shots)		Goalie stats	Dawson Cowan (29 saves / 34 shots)

May 16	Medicine Hat Tigers	4–2	Spokane Chiefs	Spokane Arena	Recap
No scoring		First period	No scoring
Niilopekka Muhonen (1) – 12:42		Second period	No scoring
Gavin McKenna (9) – pp – 5:01; Hunter St. Martin (7) – 5:45; Bryce Pickford (13) – en – 18:46		Third period	6:34 – pp – Andrew Cristall (21); 9:13 – Assanali Sarkenov (9)
Harrison Meneghin (34 saves / 36 shots)		Goalie stats	Dawson Cowan (32 saves / 35 shots)

Medicine Hat wins series 4 – 1

== Playoff scoring leaders ==
Note: GP = Games played; G = Goals; A = Assists; Pts = Points; PIM = Penalty minutes

Player	Team	GP	G	A	Pts	PIM
Berkly Catton	Spokane Chiefs	20	11	31	42	10
Andrew Cristall	Spokane Chiefs	19	21	20	41	11
Gavin McKenna	Medicine Hat Tigers	16	9	29	38	6
Kyle Chyzowski	Portland Winterhawks	18	12	21	33	12
Tyson Jugnauth	Portland Winterhawks	18	4	29	33	10
Shea Van Olm	Spokane Chiefs	20	13	18	31	20
Oasiz Wiesblatt	Medicine Hat Tigers	18	14	15	29	30
Diego Buttazzoni	Portland Winterhawks	18	14	13	27	21
Cole Reschny	Victoria Royals	11	9	16	25	10
Bryce Pickford	Medicine Hat Tigers	18	13	11	24	12

== Playoff leading goaltenders ==
Note: GP = Games played; Mins = Minutes played; W = Wins; L = Losses; GA = Goals Allowed; SO = Shutouts; SV% = Save percentage; GAA = Goals against average

Player	Team	GP	Mins	W	L	GA	SO	Sv%	GAA
Johnny Hicks	Victoria Royals	8	430	5	1	15	2	.939	2.10
Harrison Meneghin	Medicine Hat Tigers	16	918	14	1	36	3	.906	2.35
Anders Miller	Calgary Hitmen	10	588	7	3	25	0	.902	2.55
Brady Smith	Vancouver Giants	3	94	0	1	4	0	.929	2.56
Raiden LeGall	Everett Silvertips	10	652	5	5	29	1	.920	2.67

== WHL awards ==
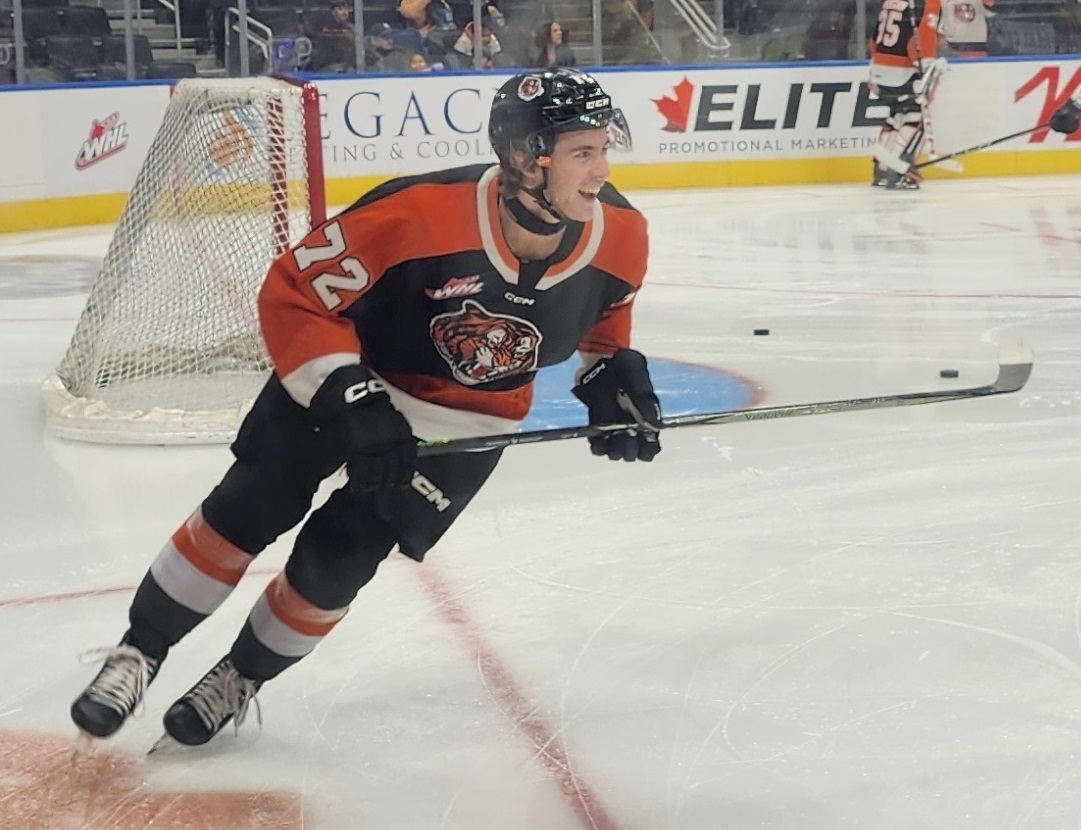
Gavin McKenna was awarded the Four Broncos Memorial Trophy as the league's player of the year, and the WHL Plus-Minus Award.

Scotty Munro Memorial Trophy	Regular season champions	Everett Silvertips
Four Broncos Memorial Trophy	Player of the Year	Gavin McKenna, Medicine Hat Tigers
Bob Clarke Trophy	Top Scorer	Andrew Cristall, Kelowna/Spokane
Bill Hunter Memorial Trophy	Top Defenceman	Tyson Jugnauth, Portland Winterhawks
Jim Piggott Memorial Trophy	Rookie of the Year	Landon DuPont, Everett Silvertips
Del Wilson Trophy	Top Goaltender	Max Hildebrand, Prince Albert Raiders
WHL Plus-Minus Award	Top Plus-Minus Rating	Gavin McKenna, Medicine Hat Tigers
Brad Hornung Trophy	Most Sportsmanlike Player	Berkly Catton, Spokane Chiefs
Daryl K. (Doc) Seaman Trophy	Scholastic player of the Year	Max Curran, Tri-City Americans
Jim Donlevy Memorial Trophy	Scholastic team of the Year	Calgary Hitmen
Dunc McCallum Memorial Trophy	Coach of the Year	James Patrick, Victoria Royals
Lloyd Saunders Memorial Trophy	Executive of the Year	Matt Bardsley, Spokane Chiefs
Allen Paradice Memorial Trophy	Top Official	Mike Langin
St. Clair Group Trophy	Marketing/Public Relations Award	Spokane Chiefs
Doug Wickenheiser Memorial Trophy	Humanitarian of the Year	Kyle McDonough, Portland Winterhawks
WHL Playoff MVP	WHL Finals Most Valuable Player	Harrison Meneghin, Medicine Hat Tigers
Professional Hockey Achievement; Academic Recipient	Alumni Achievement Awards	

== Attendance ==
=== Regular season ===
Home team	Home games	Average attendance	Total attendance
Edmonton Oil Kings	34	7,527	255,923
Spokane Chiefs	34	6,587	223,978
Everett Silvertips	34	6,358	216,186
Portland Winterhawks	34	5,072	172,477
Saskatoon Blades	34	4,770	162,207
Calgary Hitmen	34	4,576	155,605
Seattle Thunderbirds	34	4,559	155,013
Prince George Cougars	34	4,177	142,047
Kelowna Rockets	34	4,152	141,190
Red Deer Rebels	34	4,151	141,164
Tri-City Americans	34	4,008	136,301
Kamloops Blazers	34	3,873	131,704
Medicine Hat Tigers	34	3,864	131,398
Lethbridge Hurricanes	34	3,784	128,680
Vancouver Giants	34	3,737	127,081
Victoria Royals	34	3,679	125,093
Moose Jaw Warriors	34	3,115	105,914
Wenatchee Wild	34	3,044	103,526
Brandon Wheat Kings	34	2,985	101,512
Regina Pats	34	2,973	101,109
Prince Albert Raiders	34	2,527	85,930
Swift Current Broncos	34	2,306	78,429
League	748	4,174	3,122,466

=== Playoffs ===
Home team	Home games	Average attendance	Total attendance
Prince George Cougars	4	5,914	23,658
Medicine Hat Tigers	9	5,836	52,529
Spokane Chiefs	11	5,665	62,323
Everett Silvertips	7	5,384	37,690
Saskatoon Blades	2	5,217	10,434
Edmonton Oil Kings	3	5,035	15,105
Victoria Royals	5	4,644	23,220
Lethbridge Hurricanes	8	4,540	36,323
Portland Winterhawks	8	4,464	35,712
Calgary Hitmen	6	3,741	22,450
Seattle Thunderbirds	3	3,445	10,336
Prince Albert Raiders	6	3,096	18,576
Vancouver Giants	2	3,018	6,036
Swift Current Broncos	2	2,890	5,780
Tri-City Americans	3	2,431	7,308
Brandon Wheat Kings	2	1,455	2,910
League	81	4,573	370,429

== See also ==
- List of WHL seasons
- 2024–25 OHL season
- 2024–25 QMJHL season
- 2025 Memorial Cup

Preceded by 2023–24 WHL season	WHL seasons	Succeeded by 2025–26 WHL season
