= Co-op Arena =

Co-op Arena may refer to:

- Co-op Live in Manchester, United Kingdom
- Co-op Place in Medicine Hat, Alberta, Canada
