= Sam Girard =

Canadian ice hockey player (born 1998)

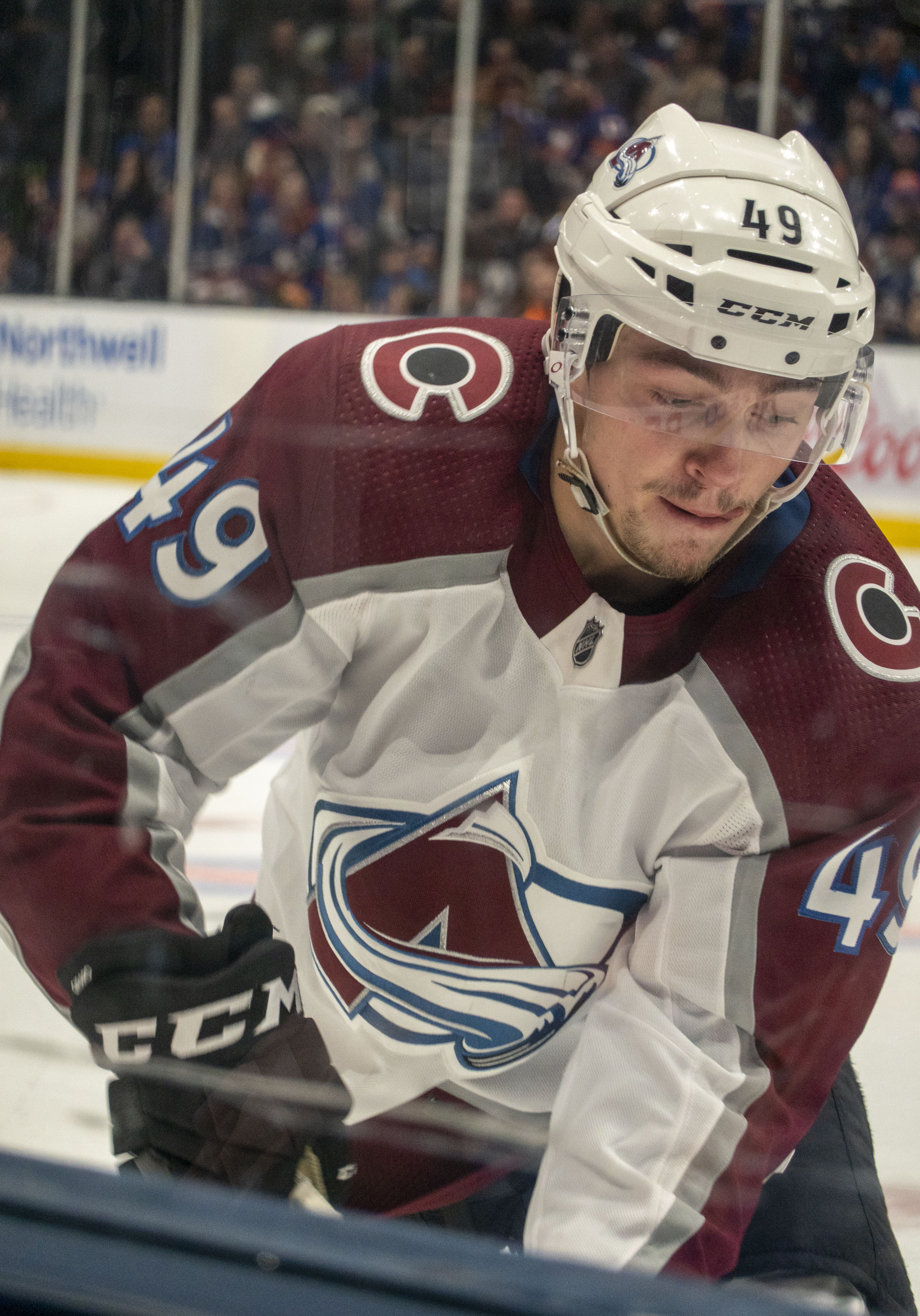
- Girard with the Colorado Avalanche in January 2020
- Born: May 12, 1998 (age 28) Roberval, Quebec, Canada
- Height: 5 ft 10 in (178 cm)
- Weight: 170 lb (77 kg; 12 st 2 lb)
- Position: Defence
- Shoots: Left
- NHL team Former teams: Pittsburgh Penguins; Nashville Predators; Colorado Avalanche
- NHL draft: 47th overall, 2016; Nashville Predators
- Playing career: 2017–present

Samuel Girard (born May 12, 1998) is a Canadian professional ice hockey player who is a defenceman for the Pittsburgh Penguins in the National Hockey League (NHL). After playing major junior hockey with the Shawinigan Cataractes, Girard was drafted 47th overall by the Nashville Predators in the 2016 NHL entry draft. He briefly played for the Predators in 2017, and was traded to the Colorado Avalanche after only five games with the organization. He went on to play parts of nine seasons with the Avalanche, winning the Stanley Cup with the team in 2022. In 2026, he was traded to Pittsburgh.

As a member of the Avalanche, Girard improved his on-ice success recording career-high numbers in his first three seasons. During the 2019–20 season, Girard joined fellow defencemen Cale Makar in the 30 points club, making the Avalanche the first team with multiple defencemen under the age of 22 who have at least 30 points since 1993–94.

He has also competed with Canada men's national junior ice hockey team at the 2015 Hlinka Gretzky Cup where he won a gold medal.

== Early life ==
Girard was born on May 12, 1998, to family day care educator Guylaine and forklift driver Tony Girard. He was raised in Roberval, Quebec, Canada, alongside siblings Jérémy, Christopher, and Jessica. Girard is also the nephew of Roberval mayor Guy Larouche. Both Sam and his brother Jérémy played midget hockey growing up; however, the family could not afford for both boys to play AAA and Jérémy gave it up.

== Playing career ==
=== Youth ===
Girard began playing ice hockey when he was four years old. While attending Wilbrod-Dufour Pavilion, he began training with Mathieu Gravel in order to increase his muscular mass and stamina. Girard played in the 2011 Quebec International Pee-Wee Hockey Tournament with a minor ice hockey team from Lac-Saint-Jean. While playing AA Bantam hockey for the Lac-St-Jean Espoirs, Girard was chosen to participate at the AllState Canadian All-Star Hockey Camp. After graduating to the Quebec Junior AAA Hockey League (QMAAA), Girard drew interest while playing with the Jonquière Élites. Leading up to the 2014 QMJHL Entry Draft, he was considered a top draft prospect for the Quebec Major Junior Hockey League (QMJHL). After the 2013–14 season, he earned QMAAA First All-Star Team and Top Defenceman honours.

=== Junior ===
Girard was drafted third overall by the Shawinigan Cataractes in the 2014 QMJHL Entry Draft, making him the first player from Jonquière Elites to be drafted that high since Jean Imbeau in 1989. Girard moved in with power skating coach Julie Robitaille during his rookie season and trained with Mathieu Bellemare, and Bruno-Carl Denis to gain physical strength. Although he was drafted at 155lb, he bulked up to 164lbs by 2015. Robitaille also trained Girard at her power skating school, where he would later coach younger players as well.

In his first season with the Cataractes, Girard recorded his first career QMJHL goal on November 15, 2014, in overtime to beat the Rouyn-Noranda 5–4. By the conclusion of his rookie season with the Cataractes, Girard recorded 43 points in 64 games which earned him the Raymond Lagacé Trophy as Defensive Rookie of the Year. He was also nominated for the Rookie of the Year Award alongside Dmytro Timashov and selected for the All-Rookie Team.

In the following season, Girard continued his scoring success and recorded a career high 74 points in 64 games. He started his sophomore season by recording seven points in two games. Later in October, Girard was selected to compete in the CHL Canada/Russia Series for Team QMJHL. On November 2, 2015, Girard was named the Third Star of the Week after recording a goal and five assists in three games. He was eventually awarded the Emile Bouchard Trophy as the QMJHL Defenceman of the Year, the Frank J. Selke Memorial Trophy as the most sportsmanlike player, and CHL Sportsman of the Year. Leading up to the 2016 NHL entry draft, Girard was ranked 38th overall for North American skaters by the NHL Central Scouting Bureau.

=== Professional ===
==== Nashville Predators ====
Girard was selected by the Nashville Predators in the second round, 47th overall, in the 2016 NHL Entry Draft. He was invited to the Predators 2016 training camp and signed a three-year, entry-level contract on September 29, 2016. However, he was returned to the QMJHL to complete his final season of junior hockey. In his final season, Girard led the Shawinigan Cataractes in assists and tied for points over 59 regular season games. He was again selected to compete with Team QMJHL at the 2016 CIBC Canada Russia Series and named to the QMJHL First All-Star Team. After his season ended, Girard was reassigned to the Predators American Hockey League (AHL) affiliate, the Milwaukee Admirals, for the conclusion of the 2016–17 season. He recorded his first career AHL goal on April 14, 2017, in a 6–2 win over the Rockford IceHogs.

Girard made his NHL debut during the Predators 2017–18 season home opener on October 10, 2017, against the Philadelphia Flyers. He registered a –1 rating and recorded his first point with an assist on a goal by Filip Forsberg. Girard scored his first NHL goal in just his second game on October 12, 2017, against the Dallas Stars, he took a pass from P. K. Subban and put a slap shot over the shoulder of Stars goalie Ben Bishop; he also recorded an assist on a goal by Filip Forsberg. He remained on the Predators roster during the 2017–18 season and appeared in five of their first 14 games of the season before he was dealt alongside Vladislav Kamenev and a 2018 second-round pick, in a three-team trade to the Colorado Avalanche, in exchange for Kyle Turris from the Ottawa Senators on November 5, 2017.

==== Colorado Avalanche ====
Girard joined the Avalanche in Stockholm, Sweden, for their Global Series games against the Ottawa Senators. In his Avalanche debut at Ericsson Globe, Girard played top-pairing minutes and registered an assist, in a 4–3 overtime defeat to the Senators on November 10, 2017. Upon returning to North America, Girard remained steady in the Avalanche's lineup. On December 23, 2017, Girard was sucker punched by Arizona Coyotes left winger Zac Rinaldo after Girard took exception to a hit on teammate Nathan MacKinnon. Two fights broke out, resulting in the ejections of Rinaldo, MacKinnon and Coyotes right winger Josh Archibald, with further disciplinary action against Rinaldo handed out after the game. Girard was not injured in the play and was able to finish the game. After averaging 21:32 in his first nine games, Girard's ice time lowered to an average of 15:10. He ended the regular season with 23 points as he helped the Avalanche qualify for the 2018 Stanley Cup playoffs. He made his post-season debut in the first round against his former team but suffered an upper-body injury which kept him out of the series.

During the 2018–19 season, Girard played in all 82 games and was tied second amongst Avalanche defencemen in points with 27. He also played an average of 19:53, including a career-high 26:36 on November 30 against the St. Louis Blues. On December 19, 2019, Girard was fined $1,957.89 for boarding Chicago Blackhawks winger Alex DeBrincat. The Avalanche again qualified for the 2019 Stanley Cup playoffs and Girard was partnered with Erik Johnson in their first round matchup against the Calgary Flames. However, after suffering a shoulder injury, he was replaced by Cale Makar. After missing the conclusion of Round 1, Girard returned to the Avalanche's lineup for Round 2 against the San Jose Sharks. Once the team was eliminated from the Stanley Cup playoffs, Girard signed a seven-year, $35 million contract extension with the Avalanche, carrying an annual average of $5 million, on July 31, 2019.

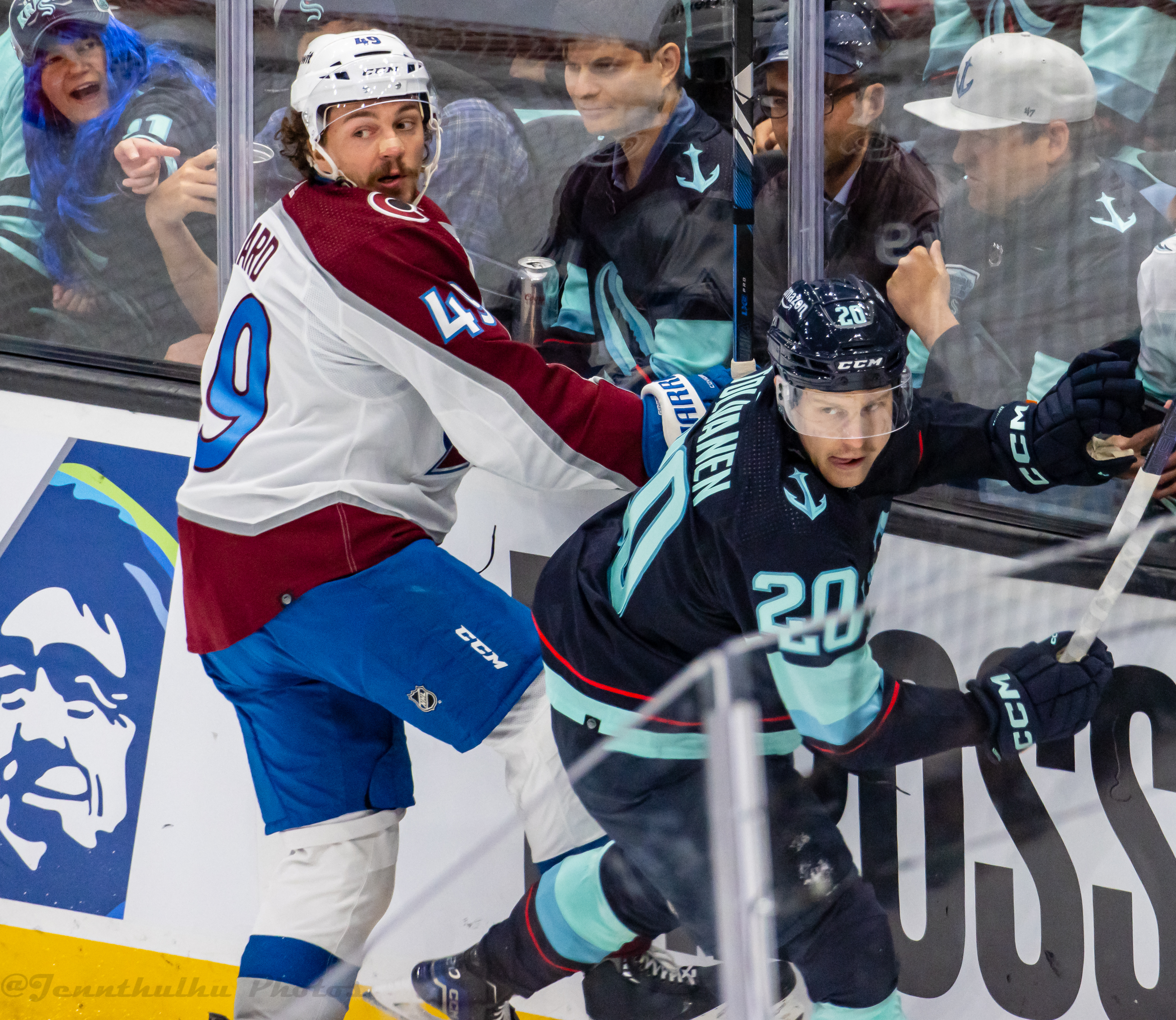
Girard with the Avalanche in October 2023

Girard returned to the Avalanche for the 2019–20 and was named to their opening night roster. On January 2, he recorded a career-high four assists in a 7–3 win over the St. Louis Blues. Later that month, he played in his 200th career NHL game and became the longest active iron man streak holder on the team. In his 200th career game on January 11, Girard also recorded two assists in their 4–3 overtime loss to the Pittsburgh Penguins. He continued his third season by tying his career high of 27 points with a goal in a 6–1 win over the Buffalo Sabres on February 5. Girard would later join fellow defencemen Cale Makar in the 30 points club, making the Avalanche the first team with multiple defencemen under the age of 22 who have at least 30 points since 1993–94.

Due to the COVID-19 pandemic, the 2020-21 season was shortened to 56 games and began on January 13, 2021. The Avalanche were also temporarily moved into a new division and competed solely against the Anaheim Ducks, Arizona Coyotes, Los Angeles Kings, Minnesota Wild, San Jose Sharks, St. Louis Blues, and Vegas Golden Knights. Upon skating in his 226th consecutive game on January 24, Girard tied Karlis Skrastins for the second-longest iron man streak by a Colorado defenceman in franchise history. He passed Skrastins on January 26 while playing against the San Jose Sharks. However, his streak came to an end on February 14 after playing in 231 consecutive regular-season games. He missed two games after being placed in the league's COVID-19 protocols but returned on February 20. On March 6, Girard recorded his 100th and 101st career NHL point, becoming the third defenseman from his 2016 year to reach this mark. He continued to contribute offensively throughout April and recorded his eigthth multi-point game in a single season, a new career-high, on April 5. Girard finished the shortened season with a career-high five goals and ranked second among team defensemen in scoring. While he was not considered for the James Norris Memorial Trophy as the league's top defenceman, Makar praised Girard as "a top, elite D-man in the league.” His overall efforts helped the Avalanche qualify for the 2021 Stanley Cup playoffs, where he contributed five assists in 10 games.

Girard participated in the Avalanche's run in the 2022 Stanley Cup playoffs until game three of the second round series against the St. Louis Blues, when he exited the game after a hit from Blues forward Ivan Barbashev. The Avalanche reported that he had broken his sternum and would miss the remainder of the playoffs. In Girard's absence, the Avalanche would continue to advance to the Stanley Cup Final and defeat the two-time defending Stanley Cup champion Tampa Bay Lightning in six games to take the Cup.

Girard enjoyed a career-high performance in the 2022–23 season. He started the season slowly, recording only five points in his first 25 games, but in December changed to a stick which was around five or six inches longer. In the following 31 games, he scored 23 points, and finished with a career-high of 37 in 76 games. The Avalanche went on to clinch the Central Division title for the second season in a row, and drew the Seattle Kraken in the first round of the playoffs. The Avalanche were ultimately unable to defend their championship, with the Kraken upsetting the Avalanche in seven games; Girard recorded two assists through the series.

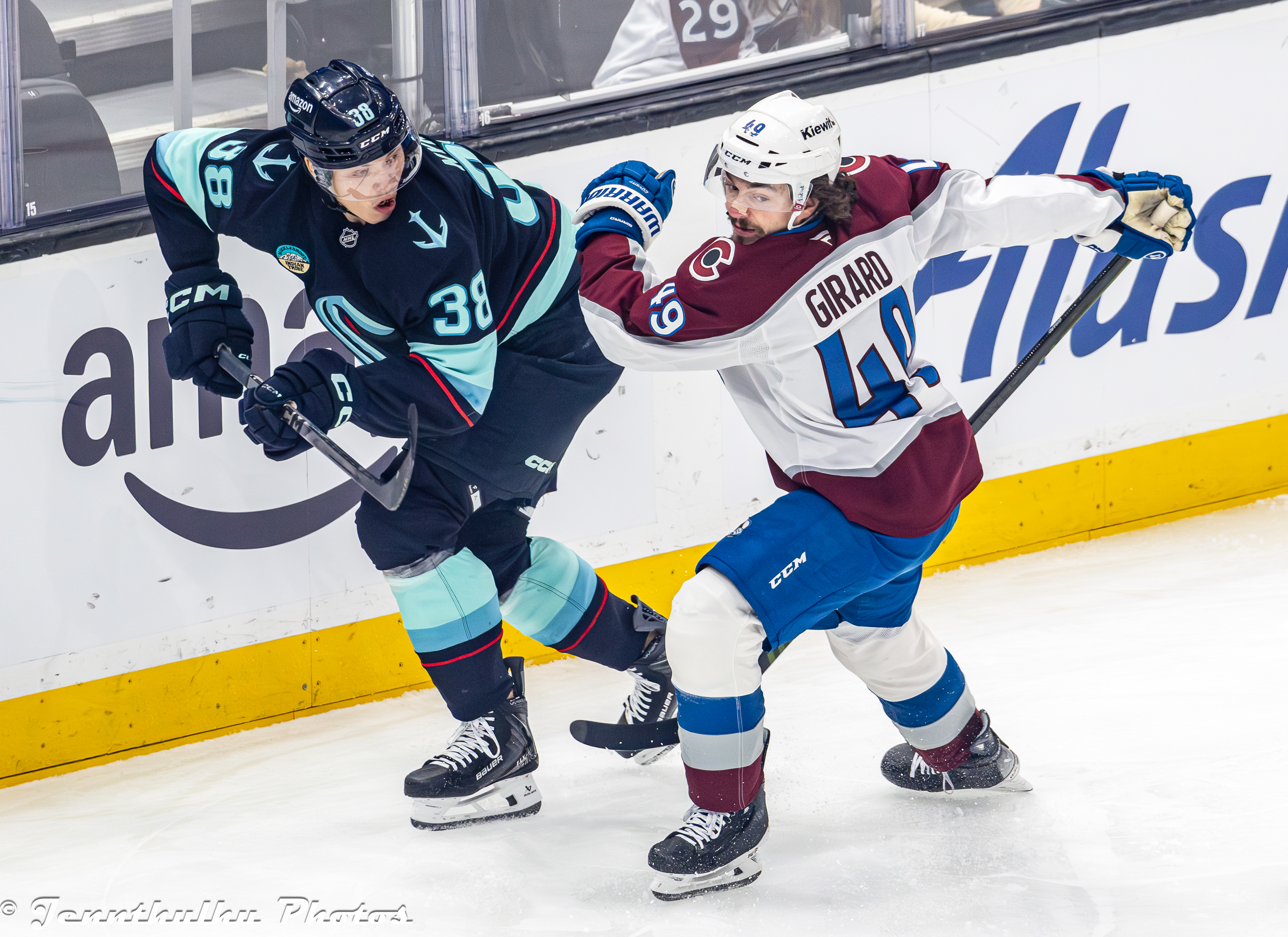
Girard with the Avalanche in 2025.

On October 10, 2024, Girard recorded his 200th career NHL point with two assists in the Avalanche's 8-4 loss to the Golden Knights. He reached another milestone on December 3 upon playing in his 500th NHL game. He subsequently became the 58th Quebec-born defenseman in NHL history to reach this feat.

After participating in the Avalanche's 2025 training camp, Girard skated in the team's first two games before being placed on injured reserve. The team announced that he was considered "week to week" due to an upper-body injury. He was activated from injured reserve on November 13, after missing 15 games.

==== Pittsburgh Penguins ====
Midway through the 2025–26 season, Girard was traded to the Pittsburgh Penguins on February 24, 2026, alongside a 2028 second-round pick, in exchange for Brett Kulak.

== International play ==
As a citizen of Canada, Girard has been given the opportunity to compete with Team Canada at multiple international levels. In his rookie season with the Shawinigan Cataractes, Girard was selected for Team Canada at the World U-17 Hockey Challenge. In 2015, Girard was selected to compete with Team Canada at the Hlinka Gretzky Cup. He played four games and recorded one point as Canada won a gold medal. The next year, he was invited to Team Canada's 2016 National Junior Team Development Camp and 2017 National Junior Team Development Camp.

== Player profile ==
"Samuel has been one of our best all-around defencemen since joining the Avalanche....He plays important minutes and is someone our coaches count on to play against other teams' top lines. He has an exceptional ability to skate and move the puck."

— Avalanche general manager Joe Sakic of Girard's skating ability.

Described as a smooth-skating and mobile player, Girard is compared to long-time Chicago Blackhawks defenceman Duncan Keith. Standing at 5-foot-10 in his draft year, Girard has also drawn comparisons to Brian Campbell due to his stature, "strong edge work and balance."

Ryan Kennedy of The Hockey News described Girard as "An excellent offensive defenceman who uses his smarts to get around the ice, Girard ended the regular season [of his draft year] en fuego, with seven points in his last two games. Defensive play is a concern, but his escapability is uncanny when he has the puck."

== Personal life ==
In 2019, the Benoît-Lévesque Sports Centre, where Girard played hockey growing up, created a recognition window which depicted about Girard's journey to the NHL. He was also invited to sit as honorary presidents of the cadet and juvenile division 1 School Hockey Championship with the Quebec Student Sports Network.

Girard is actively involved in helping raise funds for cystic fibrosis, which his cousin is afflicted by. In 2019, Girard and his father hosted a pocket game tournament to raise funds towards a cure for cystic fibrosis. He also donated a portion of his profits from the QMJHL to the Julie Robitaille's School of Power Skating who helped him train.

In 2018, as he was returning from a charity event, Girard fell asleep at the wheel while driving a Chevrolet Camaro and it struck the parapet, causing major damage. He maintained minor neck pain after the injury and was transported to Alma Hospital as a preventative measure.

In November 2023, Girard entered the NHL/NHLPA player assistance program due to anxiety and depression leading to alcohol abuse.

== Career statistics ==
=== Regular season and playoffs ===
			Regular season					Playoffs
Season	Team	League	GP	G	A	Pts	PIM	GP	G	A	Pts	PIM
2013–14	Jonquière Élites	QMAAA	42	7	29	36	16	—	—	—	—	—
2014–15	Shawinigan Cataractes	QMJHL	64	5	38	43	8	7	0	2	2	2
2015–16	Shawinigan Cataractes	QMJHL	67	10	64	74	10	21	2	20	22	4
2016–17	Shawinigan Cataractes	QMJHL	59	9	66	75	29	5	1	8	9	4
2016–17	Milwaukee Admirals	AHL	6	1	0	1	0	2	0	0	0	2
2017–18	Nashville Predators	NHL	5	1	2	3	2	—	—	—	—	—
2017–18	Colorado Avalanche	NHL	68	3	17	20	6	3	0	0	0	0
2018–19	Colorado Avalanche	NHL	82	4	23	27	6	9	0	2	2	0
2019–20	Colorado Avalanche	NHL	70	4	30	34	17	15	1	9	10	6
2020–21	Colorado Avalanche	NHL	48	5	27	32	16	10	0	5	5	2
2021–22	Colorado Avalanche	NHL	67	5	23	28	20	7	1	2	3	0
2022–23	Colorado Avalanche	NHL	76	6	31	37	16	7	0	2	2	2
2023–24	Colorado Avalanche	NHL	59	3	15	18	10	9	0	3	3	0
2024–25	Colorado Avalanche	NHL	73	3	21	24	14	7	1	2	3	0
2025–26	Colorado Avalanche	NHL	40	3	9	12	15	—	—	—	—	—
2025–26	Pittsburgh Penguins	NHL	20	0	7	7	8	6	0	0	0	4
NHL totals			608	37	205	242	130	73	3	25	28	14

=== International ===
Year	Team	Event	Result	GP	G	A	Pts	PIM
2014	Canada Black	U17	7th	5	1	2	3	0
2015	Canada	IH18	1st place, gold medalist(s)	4	1	0	1	0
Junior totals				9	2	2	4	0

== Awards and honours ==
Award	Year
QMAAA
First All-Star Team	2014
Top Defenceman	2014
QMJHL
All-Rookie Team	2015
Raymond Lagacé Trophy	2015
First All-Star Team	2016, 2017
Emile Bouchard Trophy	2016
Frank J. Selke Memorial Trophy	2016
CHL Sportsman of the Year	2016
NHL
Stanley Cup champion	2022
