= Ben Kindel =

Canadian ice hockey player (born 2007)

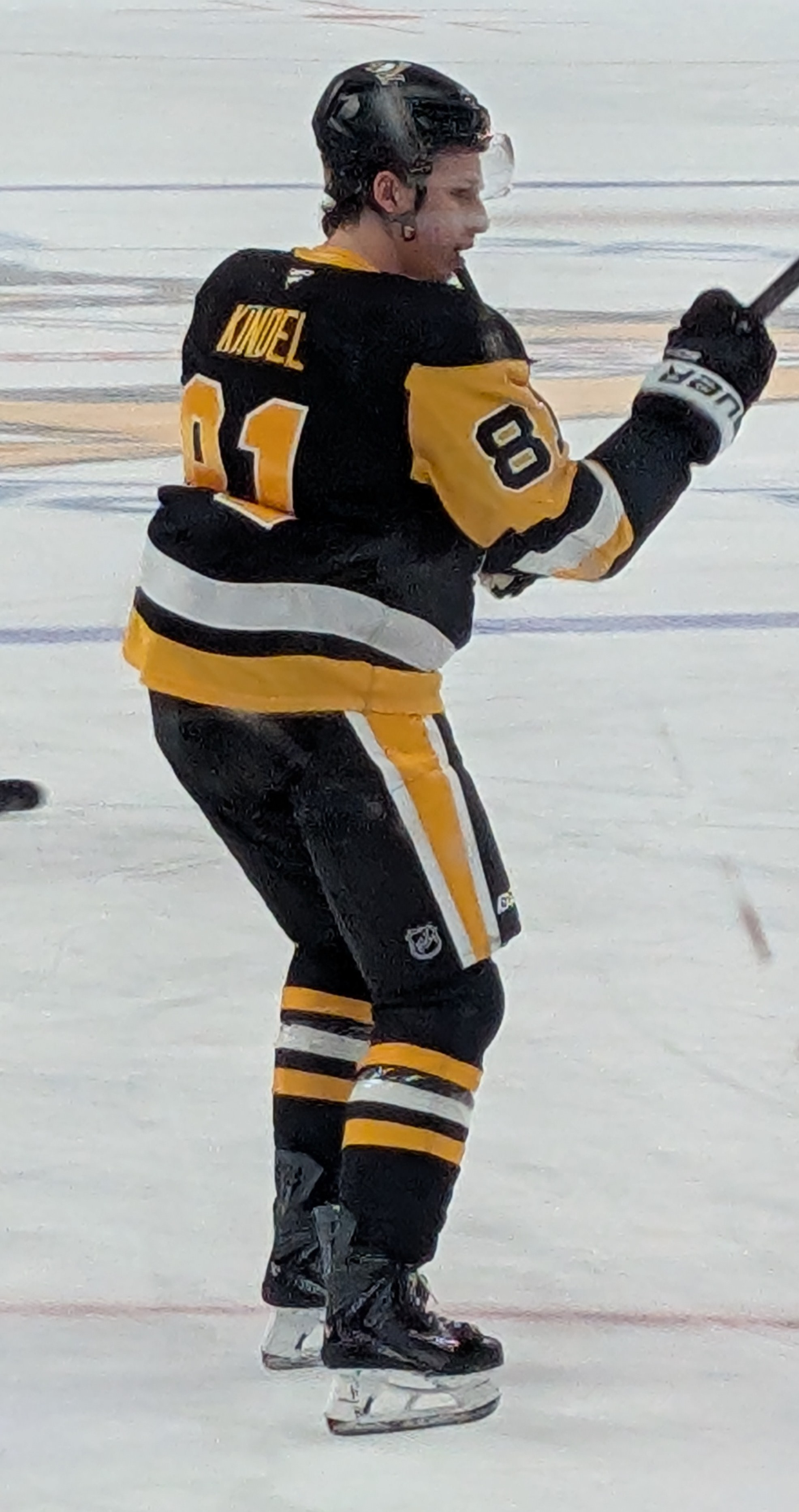
- Kindel warming up with the Pittsburgh Penguins in 2026
- Born: April 19, 2007 (age 19) Coquitlam, British Columbia, Canada
- Height: 5 ft 11 in (180 cm)
- Weight: 182 lb (83 kg; 13 st 0 lb)
- Position: Forward
- Shoots: Right
- NHL team: Pittsburgh Penguins
- NHL draft: 11th overall, 2025; Pittsburgh Penguins
- Playing career: 2025–present

Benjamin Andrew Kindel (born April 19, 2007) is a Canadian professional ice hockey player who is a forward for the Pittsburgh Penguins of the National Hockey League. A prospect from the Calgary Hitmen of the Western Hockey League (WHL), he was drafted eleventh overall by the Penguins in the 2025 NHL entry draft.

== Playing career ==
=== Juniors ===
Growing up in British Columbia, Kindel played for the Burnaby Winter Club U15 team from 2020 to 2022. He missed the first half of the 2021–22 season due to a broken hand, but was noticed by Garry Davidson, general manager of the Calgary Hitmen, at the John Reid Memorial Tournament. After being drafted by the Hitmen in the second round of the 2022 Western Hockey League (WHL) Prospects Draft, Kindel played one season with the Yale U18 prep team. He scored 17 goals and 29 assists through 29 games with the team. Kindel made the Hitmen's opening lineup for the 2023–24 season at the age of 16 after a strong performance in training camp and the preseason. He was named the WHL's Rookie of the Week for the week ending November 12, 2023, after scoring six points in two games. By January, Kindel was tied for fourth in rookie scoring with 31 points. He was named the Hitmen's Rookie of the Year after finishing his rookie season with 15 goals and a team-leading 45 assists.

Kindel greatly improved upon his rookie season upon returning to the Hitmen for the 2024–25 season. He began the season with four goals and seven assists through nine games and was selected for the 2024 CHL USA Prospects Challenge. By November, Kindel led the team with nine goals and 19 points through 15 games. He also gained attention from National Hockey League (NHL) scouts and was ranked in the top 20 of all North American skaters by the NHL Central Scouting Bureau in their mid-term report. On January 8, Kindel set a new franchise record for longest point streak by a Hitmen player. He finished the regular season as the Hitmen's scoring leader with 35 goals and 64 assists. He was also named to the Eastern Conference First All-Star Team with linemate Oliver Tulk.

Upon completing his sophomore season, Kindel was drafted in the first round, 11th overall, by the Pittsburgh Penguins in the 2025 NHL entry draft. He signed a three-year entry-level contract with the team on July 8. As he was the Penguins' top pick of the draft, he was eligible to play in the NHL that season.

=== Professional ===
Kindel became the fifth-youngest player in franchise history to make his NHL debut after playing his first game on October 7, 2025, against the New York Rangers. He scored his first career NHL goal on October 11 against the Rangers. On November 3, Kindel recorded his first multi-goal NHL game, scoring two goals in a 4–3 loss to the Toronto Maple Leafs. By the end of his twelfth professional game, he had already recorded five goals. After December 14, Kindel suffered a 19-game goal drought, but snapped the streak on January 25, 2026 with two goals in a 3–2 victory over his hometown Vancouver Canucks.

On October 20, 2026, Kindel suffered an unspecified medical emergency on the team's plane during the 2026-27 season while the team was traveling home following their game against the Utah Mammoth, during which Kindel played. He was taken by ambulance to the University of Utah hospital reportedly alert, conscious and stable, after being tended to by team medical staff on the plane. General manager Kyle Dubas stated on October 22, that Kindel had suffered a vasovagal syncope about 10 minutes into the flight. Following testing, Kindel was projected to return to training within four days if no complications are discovered. Kindel returned to practice on October 27, and returned to play in the October 29 home game against the Mammoth.

== International play ==
After completing his rookie season with the Calgary Hitmen, Kindel was named to Canada national under-18 team for the 2024 Hlinka Gretzky Cup. He helped Team Canada clinch a gold medal for the third consecutive year. Kindel was also selected to represent Team Canada at the 2025 IIHF World U18 Championships after the Hitmen were eliminated from the 2025 WHL playoffs.

== Personal life ==
Kindel is the son of Steve Kindel and Sara Maglio, and the brother of Lacey Kindel. Both of his parents played professional soccer; Steve played for the Vancouver Whitecaps of the A-League and the Canadian national team, while Sara played for the Vancouver Whitecaps women's team and the Canadian national team. As such, he played both soccer and ice hockey until his teenage years. Due to his father's influence, he grew up a fan of the Montreal Canadiens and admired Brendan Gallagher. Kindel is of Italian descent.

== Career statistics ==
=== Regular season and playoffs ===
			Regular season					Playoffs
Season	Team	League	GP	G	A	Pts	PIM	GP	G	A	Pts	PIM
2022–23	Calgary Hitmen	WHL	1	0	0	0	0	—	—	—	—	—
2023–24	Calgary Hitmen	WHL	68	15	45	60	14	—	—	—	—	—
2024–25	Calgary Hitmen	WHL	65	35	64	99	39	11	8	7	15	8
2025–26	Pittsburgh Penguins	NHL	77	17	18	35	18	6	0	0	0	0
NHL totals			77	17	18	35	18	6	0	0	0	0

=== International ===
Note: GP = Games played; G = Goals; A = Assists; Pts = Points; PIM = Penalty minutes;

				Regular season
Year	Team	Event	Result	GP	G	A	Pts	PIM
2024	Canada	HG18	1st place, gold medalist(s)	5	1	1	2	0
2025	Canada	U18	3rd place, bronze medalist(s)	5	1	6	7	2
Junior totals				5	2	7	9	2

Awards and achievements
Preceded by Brayden Yager	Pittsburgh Penguins first-round draft pick 2025	Succeeded by Bill Zonnon
