= CHL Sportsman of the Year =

Annual award to a Canadian Hockey League player

CHL Sportsman of the Year Award
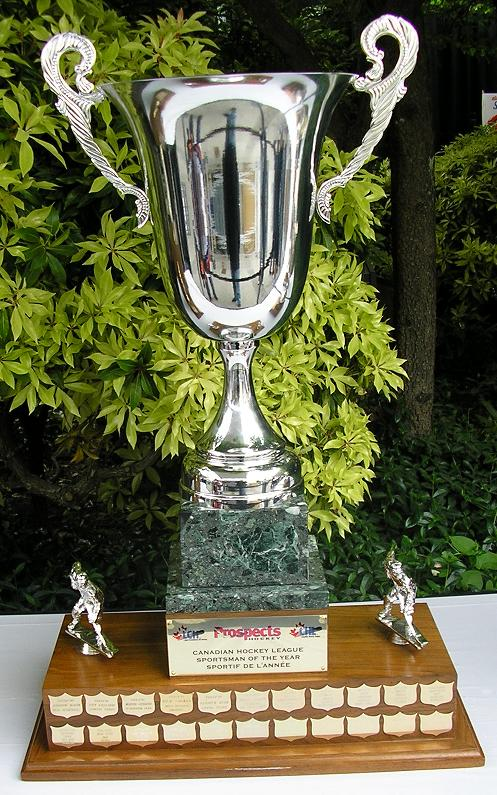
- Sport: Ice hockey
- Awarded for: Annually to the most sportsmanlike player in the Canadian Hockey League

History
- First award: 1990
- First winner: Andrew McKim
- Most wins: Cedric Lalonde-McNicoll (2)
- Most recent: Cole Beaudoin

The CHL Sportsman of the Year Award is given out annually to the most sportsmanlike player in the Canadian Hockey League. It is chosen from the winner of the William Hanley Trophy of the Ontario Hockey League, the Frank J. Selke Memorial Trophy of the Quebec Maritimes Junior Hockey League, or the Brad Hornung Trophy of the Western Hockey League.

== Winners ==
List of winners of the CHL Sportsman of the Year Award.

Season	Winner	Team	League
1989–90	Andrew McKim	Hull Olympiques	QMJHL
1990–91	Pat Falloon	Spokane Chiefs	WHL
1991–92	Martin Gendron	Saint-Hyacinthe Laser	QMJHL
1992–93	Rick Girard	Swift Current Broncos	WHL
1993–94	Yanick Dube	Laval Titan Collège Français	QMJHL
1994–95	Eric Daze	Beauport Harfangs	QMJHL
1995–96	Hnat Domenichelli	Kamloops Blazers	WHL
1996–97	Kelly Smart	Brandon Wheat Kings	WHL
1997–98	Cory Cyrenne	Brandon Wheat Kings	WHL
1998–99	Matt Kinch	Calgary Hitmen	WHL
1999–2000	Jonathan Roy	Moncton Wildcats	QMJHL
2000–01	Brandon Reid	Val-d'Or Foreurs	QMJHL
2001–02	Brad Boyes	Erie Otters	OHL
2002–03	Kyle Wellwood	Windsor Spitfires	OHL
2003–04	Benoit Mondou	Shawinigan Cataractes	QMJHL
2004–05	Jeff Carter	Sault Ste. Marie Greyhounds	OHL
2005–06	Kris Russell	Medicine Hat Tigers	WHL
2006–07	David Desharnais	Chicoutimi Saguenéens	QMJHL
2007–08	Cedric Lalonde-McNicoll	Shawinigan Cataractes	QMJHL
2008–09	Cedric Lalonde-McNicoll	Shawinigan Cataractes	QMJHL
2009–10	Jason Bast	Moose Jaw Warriors	WHL
2010–11	Philip-Michael Devos	Gatineau Olympiques	QMJHL
2011–12	Mark Stone	Brandon Wheat Kings	WHL
2012–13	Tyler Graovac	Belleville Bulls	OHL
2013–14	Sam Reinhart	Kootenay Ice	WHL
2014–15	Rourke Chartier	Kelowna Rockets	WHL
2015–16	Samuel Girard	Shawinigan Cataractes	QMJHL
2016–17	Nick Suzuki	Owen Sound Attack	OHL
2017–18	Aleksi Heponiemi	Swift Current Broncos	WHL
2018–19	Justin Almeida	Moose Jaw Warriors	WHL
2019–20	Nick Robertson	Peterborough Petes	OHL
2020–21	Not awarded due to COVID-19 pandemic		
2021–22	Jordan Dumais	Halifax Mooseheads	QMJHL
2022–23	Evan Vierling	Barrie Colts	OHL
2023–24	Brayden Yager	Moose Jaw Warriors	WHL
2024–25	Berkly Catton	Spokane Chiefs	WHL
2025–26	Cole Beaudoin	Barrie Colts	OHL

== See also ==
- List of Canadian Hockey League awards
