= Hnat Domenichelli =

Canadian–Swiss ice hockey player (born 1976)

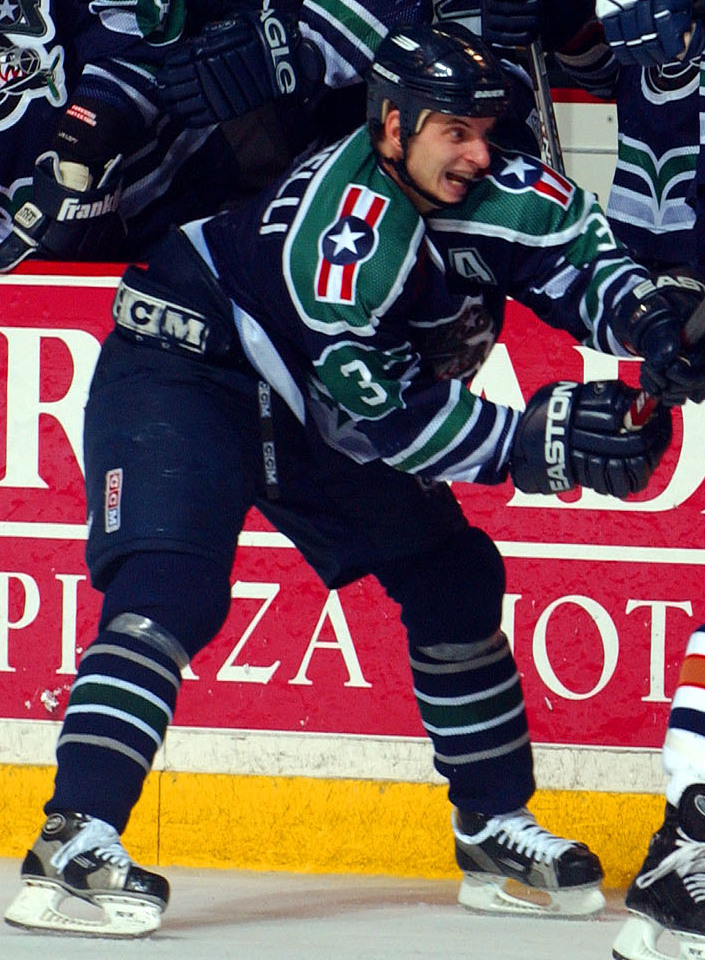
- Domenichelli with the Houston Aeros in 2003
- Born: February 16, 1976 (age 50) Edmonton, Alberta, Canada
- Height: 6 ft 0 in (183 cm)
- Weight: 198 lb (90 kg; 14 st 2 lb)
- Position: Centre
- Shot: Left
- Played for: Hartford Whalers; Calgary Flames; Atlanta Thrashers; Minnesota Wild; HC Ambri-Piotta; HC Lugano; SC Bern
- National team: Canada and Switzerland
- NHL draft: 83rd overall, 1994; Hartford Whalers
- Playing career: 1996–2014

Hnat A. Domenichelli (born February 16, 1976) is a Swiss-Canadian former professional ice hockey player. He was drafted by the Hartford Whalers in the fourth round, 83rd overall, of the 1994 NHL entry draft. He played 267 National Hockey League (NHL) games for the Whalers, Calgary Flames, Atlanta Thrashers and Minnesota Wild between 1996 and 2003 before moving to Switzerland where he has played for the remainder of his career in the National League A. After becoming a Swiss citizen in 2009, he would play for Switzerland at the 2010 Winter Olympics.

Was hired as GM of the Vancouver Giants of the WHL at the beginning of the 2025-26 season but stepped down at the end of the season when the team failed to make the playoffs. Domenichelli is currently the general manager of HC Lugano of the National League (NL).

== Playing career ==
Born in Edmonton, Alberta, Domenichelli had a stand-out junior career with the Kamloops Blazers of the Western Hockey League (WHL) and grew up a fan of the New York Rangers. He was a WHL West Second Team All-Star in 1995, and a First Team All-Star in 1996, also gaining a nod as a Canadian Hockey League (CHL) First-Team All-Star. He won the Brad Hornung Trophy as the WHL's sportsman of the year, and was named the CHL Sportsman of the Year, both in 1996. He won the WHL championship with the Blazers in 1994 and 1995 and the Memorial Cup as national Major-Junior champion in both 1994 and 1995.

The Hartford Whalers selected Domenichelli in the fourth round, 83rd overall, in the 1994 NHL entry draft. He made his professional debut with the Whalers' American Hockey League (AHL) affiliate, the Springfield Falcons, in the 1996–97 season. He also appeared in 13 games with the Whalers that season before being traded to the Calgary Flames.

Domenichelli appeared in 96 games over four seasons with the Flames before being traded, along with Dmitri Vlasenkov, to the Atlanta Thrashers during the 1999–2000 season in exchange for Jason Botterill and Darryl Shannon. He had the best scoring season of his NHL career during the 2000–01 season with the Thrashers, scoring 15 goals. During the 2001–02 season, the Thrashers traded Domenichelli to the Minnesota Wild for Andy Sutton. He left the Wild for Switzerland after the 2002–03 season.

Domenichelli played for Team Canada at the Spengler Cup early in his European hockey career before he became a Swiss citizen in 2009, which allowed him to play for the country's national team at the 2010 Winter Olympics.

== Career statistics ==
=== Regular season and playoffs ===
			Regular season					Playoffs
Season	Team	League	GP	G	A	Pts	PIM	GP	G	A	Pts	PIM
1992–93	Kamloops Blazers	WHL	45	12	8	20	15	11	1	1	2	2
1993–94	Kamloops Blazers	WHL	69	27	40	67	31	19	10	12	22	0
1994–95	Kamloops Blazers	WHL	72	52	62	114	34	19	9	9	18	9
1995–96	Kamloops Blazers	WHL	62	59	89	148	37	16	7	9	16	29
1996–97	Springfield Falcons	AHL	39	24	24	48	12	—	—	—	—	—
1996–97	Saint John Flames	AHL	1	1	1	2	0	5	5	0	5	2
1996–97	Hartford Whalers	NHL	13	2	1	3	7	—	—	—	—	—
1996–97	Calgary Flames	NHL	10	1	2	3	2	—	—	—	—	—
1997–98	Saint John Flames	AHL	48	33	13	46	24	19	7	8	15	14
1997–98	Calgary Flames	NHL	31	9	7	16	6	—	—	—	—	—
1998–99	Calgary Flames	NHL	23	5	5	10	11	—	—	—	—	—
1998–99	Saint John Flames	AHL	51	25	21	46	26	7	4	4	8	2
1999–00	Saint John Flames	AHL	12	6	7	13	8	—	—	—	—	—
1999–00	Calgary Flames	NHL	32	5	9	14	12	—	—	—	—	—
1999–00	Atlanta Thrashers	NHL	27	6	9	15	4	—	—	—	—	—
2000–01	Atlanta Thrashers	NHL	63	15	12	27	18	—	—	—	—	—
2001–02	Atlanta Thrashers	NHL	40	8	11	19	34	—	—	—	—	—
2001–02	Minnesota Wild	NHL	27	1	5	6	10	—	—	—	—	—
2002–03	Houston Aeros	AHL	62	29	34	63	58	23	6	8	14	8
2002–03	Minnesota Wild	NHL	1	0	0	0	0	—	—	—	—	—
2003–04	HC Ambrì–Piotta	NLA	42	27	32	59	84	7	2	2	4	10
2004–05	HC Ambrì–Piotta	NLA	41	23	36	59	30	1	1	0	1	25
2004–05	EHC Basel	NLB	—	—	—	—	—	7	5	5	10	0
2005–06	HC Ambrì–Piotta	NLA	44	35	24	59	18	7	4	6	10	10
2006–07	HC Ambrì–Piotta	NLA	44	21	31	52	50	—	—	—	—	—
2007–08	HC Ambrì–Piotta	NLA	26	18	22	40	22	—	—	—	—	—
2008–09	HC Lugano	NLA	40	21	19	40	8	—	—	—	—	—
2009–10	HC Lugano	NLA	50	27	35	62	16	4	0	1	1	0
2010–11	HC Lugano	NLA	48	16	27	43	16	—	—	—	—	—
2011–12	HC Lugano	NLA	48	14	19	33	18	6	0	4	4	0
2012–13	HC Lugano	NLA	17	6	4	10	8	7	3	3	6	2
2013–14	HC Lugano	NLA	10	3	4	7	0	—	—	—	—	—
2013–14	SC Bern	NLA	32	9	8	17	12	—	—	—	—	—
AHL totals			213	118	100	218	128	54	22	20	42	26
NHL totals			267	52	61	113	104	—	—	—	—	—
NLA totals			442	220	261	481	282	32	10	16	26	47

=== International ===
Year	Team	Event	Result	GP	G	A	Pts	PIM
1996	Canada	WJC	1st place, gold medalist(s)	6	2	3	5	6
2010	Switzerland	OG	8th	5	1	2	3	4
Junior totals				6	2	3	5	6
Senior totals				5	1	2	3	4

== Awards and honours ==
Medal record

Representing Canada

Men's ice hockey

World Junior Championship
Gold medal – first place	1996 United States	

Award	Year
Junior
WHL West Second All-Star Team	1994–95
WHL West First All-Star Team	1995–96
CHL First All-Star Team	1995–96
Brad Hornung Trophy	1995–96
CHL Sportsman of the Year	1995–96
