= Kyle Wellwood =

Canadian ice hockey player (born 1983)

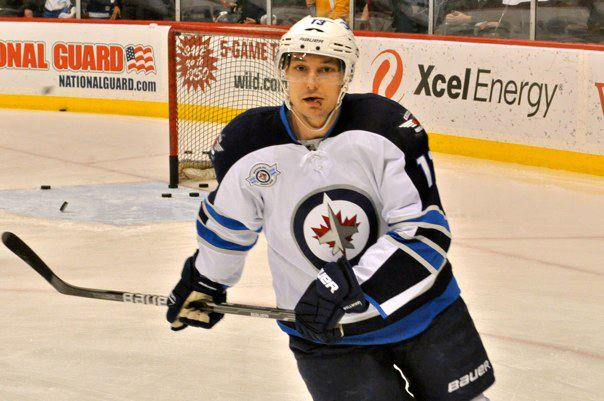
- Wellwood with the Winnipeg Jets in 2012
- Born: May 16, 1983 (age 43) Windsor, Ontario, Canada
- Height: 5 ft 10 in (178 cm)
- Weight: 181 lb (82 kg; 12 st 13 lb)
- Position: Centre
- Shot: Right
- Played for: Toronto Maple Leafs; Vancouver Canucks; Atlant Moscow Oblast; San Jose Sharks; Winnipeg Jets; EV Zug
- NHL draft: 134th overall, 2001; Toronto Maple Leafs
- Playing career: 2003–2013

Kyle Wellwood (born May 16, 1983) is a Canadian former professional ice hockey centre who played the majority of his career in the National Hockey League (NHL). He was originally selected by the Toronto Maple Leafs 134th overall in the 2001 NHL entry draft, playing his first three seasons in the NHL with Toronto before joining the Vancouver Canucks in 2008.

After not re-signing with the Canucks, Wellwood played in Russia for Atlant Moscow Oblast of the Kontinental Hockey League (KHL). He left the team due to family concerns and was then signed by the St. Louis Blues. He never played a game with them, however, as he was claimed on re-entry waivers by the San Jose Sharks. After one season with the Sharks, he signed with the Winnipeg Jets as a free agent, where he played the final two years of his NHL career. Wellwood briefly signed with EV Zug of the National League A in Switzerland.

== Playing career ==
=== Minor Hockey ===
Wellwood grew up in the small town of Oldcastle, Ontario, just east of Windsor, playing most of his minor hockey with the Essex Minor Hockey Association of the OMHA's Bluewater Hockey League. He then moved up to the AAA level and played for the Sun County Panthers of the OMHA's South Central AAA League. At the age of 15, Wellwood played one year of Jr. B. hockey with the Tecumseh Bulldogs of the OHA's Western Ontario Junior B Hockey League.

=== Junior ===
Wellwood was drafted by the Belleville Bulls in the first round, 16th overall, in the 1999 Ontario Hockey League (OHL) Draft. In his second season with Belleville (2000–01), he put up 118 points, capturing the Eddie Powers Memorial Trophy as the League's leading scorer. The next season, he was traded in January 2002 to the Windsor Spitfires in exchange for Jason Spezza. As a Spitfire, he tallied 100 points in 57 games, including a 29-game stretch in which he scored 26 goals and 59 points. In his final year of major junior, he also received the William Hanley Trophy as the OHL's sportsman of the year, as well as the CHL Sportsman of the Year Award by playing in 57 games without a single penalty minute that year.

=== Toronto Maple Leafs ===
Wellwood was drafted in the fifth round, 134th overall, by the Toronto Maple Leafs in the 2001 NHL entry draft. He turned professional in 2003–04 when he joined Toronto's minor league affiliate, the St. John's Maple Leafs of the American Hockey League (AHL). Wellwood recorded 55 points in his professional rookie season while also appearing in his first NHL game with the Maple Leafs that year.

The NHL lockout the following season guaranteed that Wellwood would play in the AHL one more season. On October 30, 2004, he set a St. John's franchise record by scoring five goals in one game against the Cleveland Barons. He finished his second season with St. John's in 2004–05 fourth in League scoring with 87 points.

As NHL play resumed the following season in 2005–06, Wellwood joined Toronto's lineup. When captain Mats Sundin was injured in the first game of the season, Wellwood was bumped to centre the first line between wingers Alexei Ponikarovsky and Nik Antropov in Sundin's absence for a month. Wellwood scored 45 points in his rookie campaign, and in the following season, on December 16, 2006, Wellwood scored his first career NHL hat-trick in a game against the New York Rangers, also posting two assists for a career-high five-point NHL game. On pace to surpass his rookie totals, Wellwood was sidelined for almost half the season and finished with 42 points in 48 games.

Wellwood suffered a sports hernia before the start of the 2007–08 season and consequently he missed the year's first 15 games. He returned on November 6, 2007, against the Ottawa Senators. After the Maple Leafs had been mathematically eliminated from playoff contention, Wellwood went to Philadelphia for minor surgery on the opposite side of his groin from the first operation, prematurely ending his season with 21 points in 59 games.

=== Vancouver Canucks ===
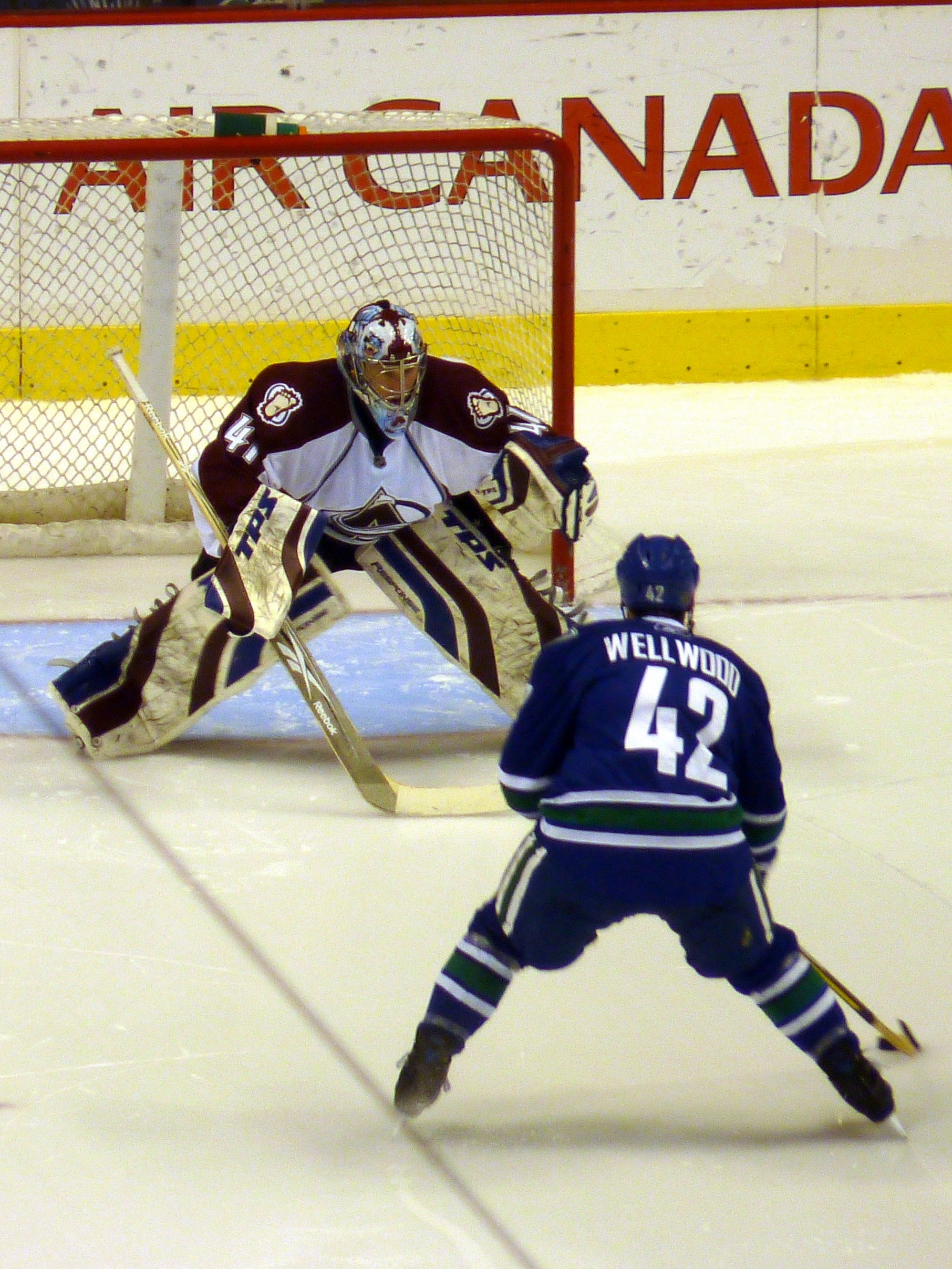
Wellwood skates against Craig Anderson in a shootout.

During the 2008 off-season, Wellwood broke a bone in his right foot while playing indoor soccer. With his contract set to expire, the Leafs placed him on waivers on June 24. He was claimed the following day by the Vancouver Canucks and was subsequently signed to a one-year, $998,000 contract. Reporting to training camp, he failed his initial fitness test and, although he passed a later evaluation, he was a healthy scratch to begin the season. On October 17, after having played just one game for the Canucks, he was placed on waivers by the team; after clearing, he was assigned to the Manitoba Moose of the AHL. Because the addition of Wellwood would have put the Moose over the limit for veteran players, Wellwood began assessing playing options in Europe; however, two days after clearing waivers, injuries to the Canucks prompted them to recall Wellwood to the NHL; he cleared re-entry waivers 24 hours later. Wellwood took advantage of this opportunity by scoring a goal and an assist in a 4–2 loss to the Columbus Blue Jackets, and he stuck with the club. Later in the season, on February 17, 2009, Wellwood ended a streak of 159 games without a penalty by taking a high-sticking penalty against the Calgary Flames. It was his first penalty since April 11, 2006. Wellwood ended his first regular season in Vancouver with 18 goals and nine assists. Having never reached the Stanley Cup playoffs with Toronto, Wellwood made his NHL playoff debut with the Canucks in 2009 and scored his first NHL playoff goal in Game 4 of the first round against the St. Louis Blues, helping Vancouver complete a four-game sweep after a 3–2 overtime win.

In the subsequent off-season, Wellwood became a restricted free agent. After taking the Canucks to arbitration on July 28, 2009, he was re-signed to a one-year, $1.2 million contract two days later on July 30; terms in the NHL Collective Bargaining Agreement (CBA) did not allow the Canucks to walk away from a ruling of less than $1.57 million. Having earned a reputation in his first Canucks season for a lack of fitness, Wellwood reported to training camp for the 2009–10 season 15 pounds lighter than in the previous year. He began the season playing on the third line with Steve Bernier and Mason Raymond, a combination that Head Coach Alain Vigneault carried over from the latter stages of the 2008–09 season and playoffs. Wellwood was sidelined early in the season, suffering a broken toe after blocking a shot from Maple Leafs defenceman Mike Komisarek in a game on October 24, 2009, but he returned to the lineup just eight days later, on November 1. He finished the campaign with 14 goals and 25 points in 75 games. He followed that up with a seven-point post-season as the Canucks were eliminated by the eventual Stanley Cup champions, the Chicago Blackhawks, in the second round.

=== KHL and San Jose Sharks ===
After two seasons in Vancouver, the Canucks let Wellwood become an unrestricted free agent on July 1, 2010, opting instead to sign Manny Malhotra from the San Jose Sharks as their projected third-line centre. Wellwood's main goal during the off-season was to find an opportunity to play centre on a scoring line. He accepted an invitation to the Phoenix Coyotes' training camp on a try-out basis. However, he was unable to secure a spot on the Coyotes' roster and was released on October 1. Four days later, he signed with Atlant Moscow Oblast of the Russian Kontinental Hockey League (KHL). In January 2011, he was released from Atlant. Initially it was believed that he had been released due to performance issues, but it was soon revealed that Wellwood was returning to his hometown of Windsor, Ontario, for family reasons.

Later in the 2010–11 season, he was reported to have signed with the St. Louis Blues; however, Blues officials denied the report, stating that they were unsure where the information came from. St. Louis General Manager Doug Armstrong stated that they were interested in Wellwood, but had ultimately not opted to sign him. According to a St. Louis-based reporter, the team was waiting for confirmation of Wellwood's release from Atlant before they finalized the signing. On January 17, Wellwood officially signed a one-year deal with the Blues, but needed to clear re-entry waivers prior to joining the team. The following day, however, he was claimed by the San Jose Sharks. He scored his first goal for the Sharks on February 1, in a game against Phoenix, Wellwood's goal tied the game at 3–3 and was considered a rallying point for San Jose as they eventually came back to win 5–3 after being down 3–0.

=== Winnipeg Jets & EV Zug ===
After becoming a free agent in the off-season, Wellwood signed a one-year, US$700,000 contract with the Winnipeg Jets on September 8, 2011. With 47 points on the season, Wellwood set a career-high in points, while tying his previous career-high of 18 goals in a season. On July 13, 2012, Wellwood re-signed with the Jets on a one-year $1.6 million contract. After the 2012–13 season, Winnipeg opted not extend his contract, thereby making Wellwood an unrestricted free agent. After failing to sign with any NHL team, Wellwood signed a one-month contract with EV Zug of the Swiss National League A. After expiration of the contract, he reportedly retired from professional hockey with his "heart no longer in the game," though he stated he would explore NHL options before officially retiring.

== International play ==
Medal record

Representing Canada

Ice hockey

World Junior Championships
Silver medal – second place	2003 Canada	

As a junior in his fourth and final OHL season, Wellwood competed for Canada at the 2003 World Junior Championships, earning a silver medal. He contributed one goal and four assists in six games.

== Personal life ==
His brother Eric is currently the assistant coach of the Toronto Marlies of the AHL. Eric played for the Philadelphia Flyers after being selected by the team in the sixth round of the 2009 NHL entry draft.

In May 2025, Wellwood self-published a novel, Edgar and the Boreal Crown, that is about an "ex-player who is raising a teenage hockey-playing daughter in Vancouver, and drives a food truck that offers up only healthy grub."

== Career statistics ==
=== Regular season and playoffs ===
			Regular season					Playoffs
Season	Team	League	GP	G	A	Pts	PIM	GP	G	A	Pts	PIM
1997–98	Sun County Panthers	OMHA	48	34	60	94	20	—	—	—	—	—
1998–99	Tecumseh Bulldogs	WOHL	51	22	41	63	12	—	—	—	—	—
1999–00	Belleville Bulls	OHL	65	14	37	51	14	16	3	7	10	6
2000–01	Belleville Bulls	OHL	68	35	83	118	24	10	3	16	19	4
2001–02	Belleville Bulls	OHL	28	16	24	40	4	—	—	—	—	—
2001–02	Windsor Spitfires	OHL	26	14	21	35	0	16	12	12	24	0
2002–03	Windsor Spitfires	OHL	57	41	59	100	0	7	5	9	14	0
2003–04	St. John's Maple Leafs	AHL	76	20	35	55	6	—	—	—	—	—
2003–04	Toronto Maple Leafs	NHL	1	0	0	0	0	—	—	—	—	—
2004–05	St John's Maple Leafs	AHL	80	38	49	87	20	5	2	2	4	2
2005–06	Toronto Maple Leafs	NHL	81	11	34	45	14	—	—	—	—	—
2006–07	Toronto Maple Leafs	NHL	48	12	30	42	0	—	—	—	—	—
2007–08	Toronto Maple Leafs	NHL	59	8	13	21	0	—	—	—	—	—
2008–09	Vancouver Canucks	NHL	74	18	9	27	4	10	1	5	6	0
2009–10	Vancouver Canucks	NHL	75	14	11	25	12	12	2	5	7	0
2010–11	Atlant Moscow Oblast	KHL	25	5	3	8	2	—	—	—	—	—
2010–11	San Jose Sharks	NHL	35	5	8	13	0	18	1	6	7	0
2011–12	Winnipeg Jets	NHL	77	18	29	47	4	—	—	—	—	—
2012–13	Winnipeg Jets	NHL	39	6	9	15	2	—	—	—	—	—
2013–14	EV Zug	NLA	9	1	2	3	0	—	—	—	—	—
NHL totals			489	92	143	235	36	40	4	16	20	0

=== International ===
Year	Team	Event	Result	GP	G	A	Pts	PIM
2003	Canada	WJC	2nd place, silver medalist(s)	6	1	4	5	0
Junior totals				6	1	4	5	0

== Awards and honours ==
Major Junior

- Eddie Powers Memorial Trophy (OHL leading scorer) – 2001
- OHL Plus/Minus Award – 2001
- OHL First All-Star Team – 2001
- OHL Player of the Week – October 15, 2002; March 23, 2003
- Silver medal (Team Canada) – 2003 World Junior Championships
- CHL Third All-Star Team – 2003
- William Hanley Trophy (OHL sportsman of the year) – 2003
- CHL Sportsman of the Year – 2003

AHL

- Player of the Month – November 2003
- Player of the Week – October 31, 2004

NHL

- First Star of the Week – December 17, 2006
- Second Star of the Night – April 4, 2011
- Third Star of the Night – October 22, 2011
- Third Star of the Night – January 23, 2012
- First Star of the Night – February 2, 2012

Awards and achievements
Preceded by Sheldon Keefe	Eddie Powers Memorial Trophy; 2001	Succeeded by Nathan Robinson
Preceded by Brad Boyes	CHL Sportsman of the Year; 2003	Succeeded by Benoit Mondou
Preceded by Brad Boyes	William Hanley Trophy; 2003	Succeeded by Andre Benoit
