= Berkly Catton =

Canadian ice hockey player (born 2006)

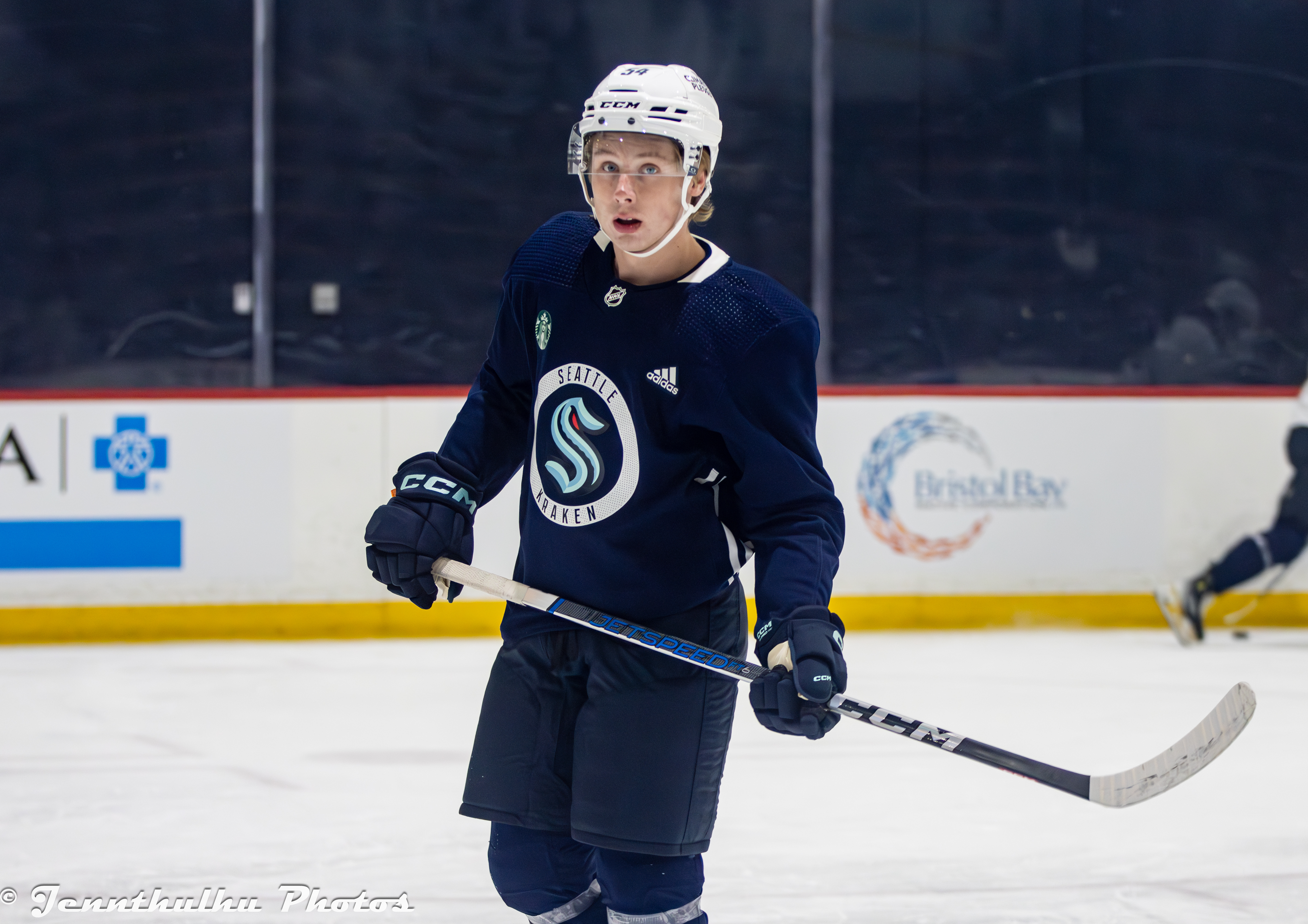
- Catton with the Seattle Kraken in 2024
- Born: January 14, 2006 (age 20) Saskatoon, Saskatchewan, Canada
- Height: 5 ft 10 in (178 cm)
- Weight: 179 lb (81 kg; 12 st 11 lb)
- Position: Forward
- Shoots: Left
- NHL team: Seattle Kraken
- NHL draft: 8th overall, 2024; Seattle Kraken
- Playing career: 2025–present

Berkly Catton (born January 14, 2006) is a Canadian professional ice hockey player who is a forward for the Seattle Kraken of the National Hockey League (NHL). He was selected eighth overall by the Kraken in the 2024 NHL entry draft.

== Playing career ==
In the years leading up to his junior career, Catton appeared for various AA and AAA teams in his hometown of Saskatoon, and for one season attended Shattuck-Saint Mary's, where he played at the 16U AAA level.

Catton was selected first overall by the Spokane Chiefs in the 2021 Western Hockey League (WHL) bantam draft. Although he considered playing college ice hockey, he ultimately chose the WHL. In his first full WHL season, the 2022–23 season, he scored 23 goals and 55 points in 63 games. Finishing tied for fifth in rookie scoring and first among 2006-born players, Catton would be nominated for the Jim Piggott Memorial Trophy for the WHL's top rookie, which would ultimately go to Ryder Ritchie.

As one of the top draft-eligible prospects in the Canadian Hockey League, Catton was selected to compete in the 2024 CHL/NHL Top Prospects Game, where he and Sam Dickinson were named captains of the two teams. On March 5, 2024, Catton surpassed the 100-point mark for the season and recorded his first WHL hat-trick with a career-high five points in a 6–3 win over the Victoria Royals. He finished the season with 54 goals and 116 points, good for fourth in the league in points and top-five in goals, and led the league with seven shorthanded goals. His 1.71 points per game led all draft-eligible CHL players. In four playoff games, he would record four assists. Catton was named to the CHL's Second All-Star Team for the year.

Catton returned to the WHL for the 2024–25 season, and was named team captain. He finished third in scoring in the regular season with 38 goals and 71 assists in 57 games. He incurred only 30 penalty minutes, a career low, and received the Brad Hornung Trophy as the WHL's most sportsmanlike player. He was also a finalist for the Four Broncos Memorial Trophy, the award for the league's most valuable player. He led the Chiefs on a deep playoff run to the WHL Finals, where they were defeated by the Medicine Hat Tigers. Following the conclusion of the postseason, he was named CHL Sportsman of the Year, and received his second consecutive Second All-Star Team designation.

== International play ==
Medal record

Representing Canada

Men's ice hockey

Hlinka Gretzky Cup
Gold medal – first place	2023 Slovakia/Czech Republic	

World U18 Championship
Bronze medal – third place	2023 Switzerland	

Catton represented Canada as the captain of their 'Red' team at the 2022 World U-17 Hockey Challenge, winning a silver medal and being named to the tournament all-star team.

In his international under-18 debut the 2023 IIHF World U18 Championships, Catton and Spokane Chiefs teammate Dawson Cowan represented Canada. Catton scored one goal and four points in seven games en route to a bronze medal.

At the 2023 Hlinka Gretzky Cup, Catton captained Team Canada to a gold medal. In five games played, his eight goals and ten points were each the best totals at the event.

== Personal life ==
Catton's second cousin Cory Sarich played professionally in the NHL and won a Stanley Cup with the Tampa Bay Lightning in 2004.

== Career statistics ==
=== Regular season and playoffs ===
Bold indicates led league

			Regular season					Playoffs
Season	Team	League	GP	G	A	Pts	PIM	GP	G	A	Pts	PIM
2021–22	Spokane Chiefs	WHL	9	1	3	4	0	4	0	0	0	2
2022–23	Spokane Chiefs	WHL	63	23	32	55	36	—	—	—	—	—
2023–24	Spokane Chiefs	WHL	68	54	62	116	41	4	0	4	4	2
2024–25	Spokane Chiefs	WHL	57	38	71	109	30	20	11	**31**	**42**	10
2025–26	Seattle Kraken	NHL	66	7	10	17	31	—	—	—	—	—
NHL totals			66	7	10	17	31	—	—	—	—	—

=== International ===
Year	Team	Event	Result	GP	G	A	Pts	PIM
2022	Canada Red	U17	2nd place, silver medalist(s)	7	3	9	12	0
2023	Canada	U18	3rd place, bronze medalist(s)	7	1	3	4	0
2023	Canada	HG18	1st place, gold medalist(s)	5	8	2	10	8
2025	Canada	WJC	5th	5	0	1	1	6
Junior totals				24	12	15	27	14

== Awards and honours ==
Award	Year	Ref
CHL
Second All-Star Team	2024, 2025	
CHL Sportsman of the Year	2025	
WHL
U.S. Division First Team All-Star	2024	
Brad Hornung Trophy	2025	
International
World U-17 Hockey Challenge – All-Star Team	2022	

Awards and achievements
Preceded by Eduard Šalé	Seattle Kraken first-round draft pick 2024	Succeeded by Jake O'Brien
