= Lukas Dragicevic =

Canadian ice hockey player (born 2005)

- Born: April 25, 2005 (age 21) Richmond, British Columbia, Canada
- Height: 6 ft 1 in (185 cm)
- Weight: 206 lb (93 kg; 14 st 10 lb)
- Position: Defenceman
- Shoots: Right
- NHL team (P) Cur. team: Seattle Kraken; Coachella Valley Firebirds (AHL)
- NHL draft: 57th overall, 2023; Seattle Kraken
- Playing career: 2024–present

Lukas Dragicevic (born April 25, 2005) is a Canadian professional ice hockey player who is a defenceman for the Coachella Valley Firebirds of the American Hockey League (AHL) while under contract to the Seattle Kraken of the National Hockey League (NHL). He was drafted in the second round, 57th overall, by the Kraken in the 2023 NHL entry draft.

Born in British Columbia, Dragicevic played hockey with Delta Hockey Academy, before he was selected by the Tri-City Americans in the 2020 WHL bantam draft. During the 2022–23 season, he set an Americans record with a 27-game point streak. In 2024, he joined the Firebirds for three games after the end of the Americans' season, recording his first professional point. Before the 2024–25 season, he was traded to the Prince Albert Raiders, with whom he finished his WHL career. He joined the Firebirds full-time for the 2025–26 season, in which he scored his first professional goal.

Internationally, Dragicevic has represented Canada, doing so at the IIHF World U18 Championship in 2022 and 2023.

== Playing career ==
=== Junior ===
Dragicevic is a native of Richmond, British Columbia, and he played junior hockey locally with Delta Hockey Academy. In his first season with the school, 2018–19, he recorded eight goals and 21 assists for 29 points in 29 games. During the 2019–20 season, he notched eight goals and 44 assists for 52 points through 30 games. On April 22, 2020, Dragicevic was selected in the 2020 Western Hockey League (WHL) bantam draft by the Tri-City Americans with the fourth-overall pick. He was signed by the team five days later.

After tallying two points in five games with Delta Hockey Academy, Dragicevic joined the Americans to finish out the 2020–21 season. He made his WHL debut on April 7, 2021, in a 5–2 loss to the Spokane Chiefs. Dragicevic finished the season with the Americans with six games played but no points. To start the 2021–22 season, Dragicevic was on the Americans' roster. On October 2, he recorded his first WHL point, an assist on a goal by Parker Bell, as part of a 5–3 victory over the Chiefs. On October 10 against the Chiefs, he scored his first WHL goal, the only Americans goal in a 5–1 loss. Dragicevic finished the season with six goals and 26 assists in 62 games.

During the 2022–23 season, Dragicevic played his 100th WHL game on December 28, 2022, against the Portland Winterhawks. From October 13 to December 30, he recorded a 27-game point streak, setting an Americans record, also tallying 37 points in that stretch. His performance landed him a spot on the NHL Central Scouting Bureau's mid-season rankings. Dragicevic earned his 100th WHL point on March 11, 2023, against the Winterhawks. He finished the season with 15 goals and 60 assists for 75 points in 68 games, making him the only defenceman in the entire Canadian Hockey League to lead his team in scoring. His play earned him a spot on the WHL's U.S. Division First All-Star Team and led him to be ranked 18th among North American skaters by the NHL Central Scouting Bureau. After recording four assists in six games of the 2023 WHL playoffs, Dragicevic was one of 106 players invited to the NHL Scouting Combine. On June 29, at the 2023 NHL entry draft, Dragicevic was drafted in the second round, 57th overall, by the Seattle Kraken.

On September 29, 2023, prior to the 2023–24 season, Dragicevic was named an alternate captain of the Americans. On March 22, 2024, he played his 200th game in the WHL, against the Winterhawks. During the season, he totaled 14 goals and 36 for 50 points. On March 28, Dragicevic signed a three-year, entry-level contract with the Kraken. On April 1, he signed an amateur tryout offer with the Coachella Valley Firebirds, the American Hockey League (AHL) affiliate of the Kraken. Dragicevic played three games with the Firebirds at the end of the AHL regular season, collecting one assist.

On July 24, 2024, Dragicevic and Eric Kahl were traded to the Prince Albert Raiders in exchange for Terrell Goldsmith, Grady Martin, Nathan Preston and a third-round WHL bantam draft pick in 2025. During the 2024–25 season, Dragicevic scored his first goal as a Raider on October 18 in a 6–4 loss to the Victoria Royals. On November 15, he notched three assists in a 5–3 victory over his former team, the Americans. In 66 games during the season, Dragicevic tallied 18 goals and 52 assists for 70 points, ranking fourth among WHL defencemen. On April 8, 2025, during the 2025 WHL playoffs, he recorded a goal and three assists in game seven of the first round against the Edmonton Oil Kings. He finished the playoffs with six goals and eight assists through 11 games.

=== Professional ===
Prior to the 2025–26 season, Dragicevic participated in the Kraken's rookie camp. He scored his first AHL goal on October 25, 2025, in a 4–3 loss to the Calgary Wranglers. Dragicevic tallied one goal and 10 assists in 43 games with the Firebirds before he suffered injury on March 13, 2026. He returned for the 2026 Calder Cup playoffs, playing in three games but recording no points.

== International play ==
On April 18, 2022, Dragicevic was named to Canada's roster for the 2022 IIHF World U18 Championships. In the tournament, he tallied one goal and two assists in four games. On June 16, 2022, Dragicevic was invited to Canada’s 2022 U-18 Summer Selection Camp. On April 15, 2023, he was named to Canada's roster for the 2023 iteration of the tournament. His two goals and two assists in seven games helped Canada win the bronze medal that year.

== Career statistics ==
=== Regular season and playoffs ===
			Regular season					Playoffs
Season	Team	League	GP	G	A	Pts	PIM	GP	G	A	Pts	PIM
2020–21	Tri-City Americans	WHL	6	0	0	0	0	—	—	—	—	—
2021–22	Tri-City Americans	WHL	62	6	26	32	50	—	—	—	—	—
2022–23	Tri-City Americans	WHL	68	15	60	75	54	6	0	4	4	0
2023–24	Tri-City Americans	WHL	66	14	36	50	52	—	—	—	—	—
2023–24	Coachella Valley Firebirds	AHL	3	0	1	1	4	—	—	—	—	—
2024–25	Prince Albert Raiders	WHL	66	18	52	70	45	11	6	8	14	6
2025–26	Coachella Valley Firebirds	AHL	43	1	10	11	22	3	0	0	0	4
AHL totals			46	1	10	11	26	3	0	0	0	4

=== International ===
Year	Team	Event	Result	GP	G	A	Pts	PIM
2022	Canada	U18	5th	4	1	2	3	2
2023	Canada	U18	3rd place, bronze medalist(s)	7	2	2	4	2
Junior totals				11	3	4	7	4
