= Canalta Hotels =

Canadian hotel chain

Canalta Hotels is a hotel chain in western Canada with 44 hotels in Alberta, Saskatchewan and Manitoba. The family owned company is based out of Drumheller and primarily targets smaller towns in Western Canada catering to sports teams, weddings, meetings and work crews.

In addition to operating hotels under the Canalta hotel brand the company also owns two Hampton Inn & Suites and one Best Western Plus. Canalta Hotels also has rights to the Ramada brand in Alberta and Saskatchewan.

In addition to hotels, the Canalta Group also operates 57 restaurants under the A&W Express banner in rural Alberta/Saskatchewan, 13 Boston Pizza franchises in Alberta, and 1 location under the in-house brand O'Shea's Eatery and Ale House.
