= Co-op Place =

Multi-use indoor arena in Medicine Hat, Alberta

- Location within Alberta Location within Canada
- Former names: Medicine Hat Events Centre; Canalta Centre (2017–2020)
- Address: 2802 Box Springs Way NW
- Location: Medicine Hat, Alberta, Canada
- Coordinates: 50°04′02″N 110°44′05″W
- Owner: City of Medicine Hat
- Operator: City of Medicine Hat
- Capacity: Hockey: 7,100

Construction
- Groundbreaking: 2013
- Opened: Sept. 23, 2015
- Architect: Architecture 49 Inc.

Tenant
- Medicine Hat Tigers (WHL) (2015–present)

Website
- coopplace.ca

Co-op Place (formerly Canalta Centre) is a 7,100-seat indoor arena located in Medicine Hat, Alberta, Canada. It opened on August 22, 2015 as the new home of the Medicine Hat Tigers of the Western Hockey League, replacing the Medicine Hat Arena.

== History ==
The arena was initially operated by SMG (now ASM Global) under a contract with the city. The arena underperformed in its first years of operations, with low ticket sales for concerts and sporting events. Its operating costs were higher than originally projected. In April 2020, the city announced that it would not renew its contract with ASM Global, and that operations for the arena would be brought in-house.

Canalta Hotels initially held the naming rights to the arena. In 2020, South Country Co-op acquired the naming rights, renaming the arena Co-op Place.
