= Alex Plante =

Canadian-South Korean ice hockey player (born 1989)

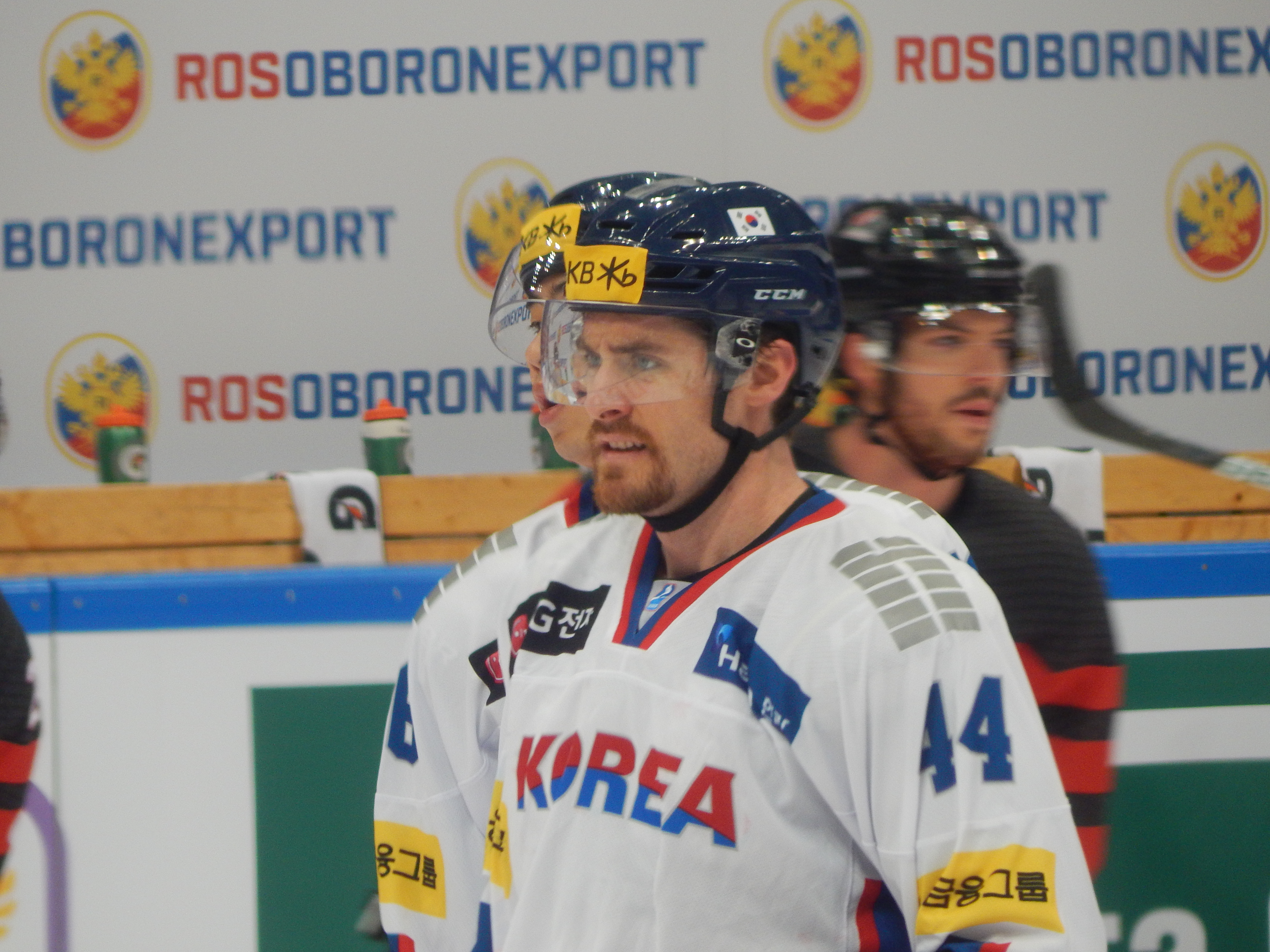
- Plante at the Channel One Cup in 2017
- Born: May 9, 1989 (age 37) Brandon, Manitoba, Canada
- Height: 6 ft 4 in (193 cm)
- Weight: 230 lb (104 kg; 16 st 6 lb)
- Position: Defence
- Shot: Right
- Played for: Edmonton Oilers; Dornbirner EC; Lørenskog IK; Anyang Halla
- National team: South Korea
- NHL draft: 15th overall, 2007; Edmonton Oilers
- Playing career: 2009–2020

Alexandre Plante (born May 9, 1989) is a Canadian-South Korean former professional ice hockey defenceman. He was selected by the Edmonton Oilers 15th overall in the 2007 NHL entry draft and made his National Hockey League (NHL) debut in 2009–10. He is the son of former professional defenceman Cam Plante, while his brother, Tyler, is a goaltending coach for the Brandon Wheat Kings.

== Playing career ==
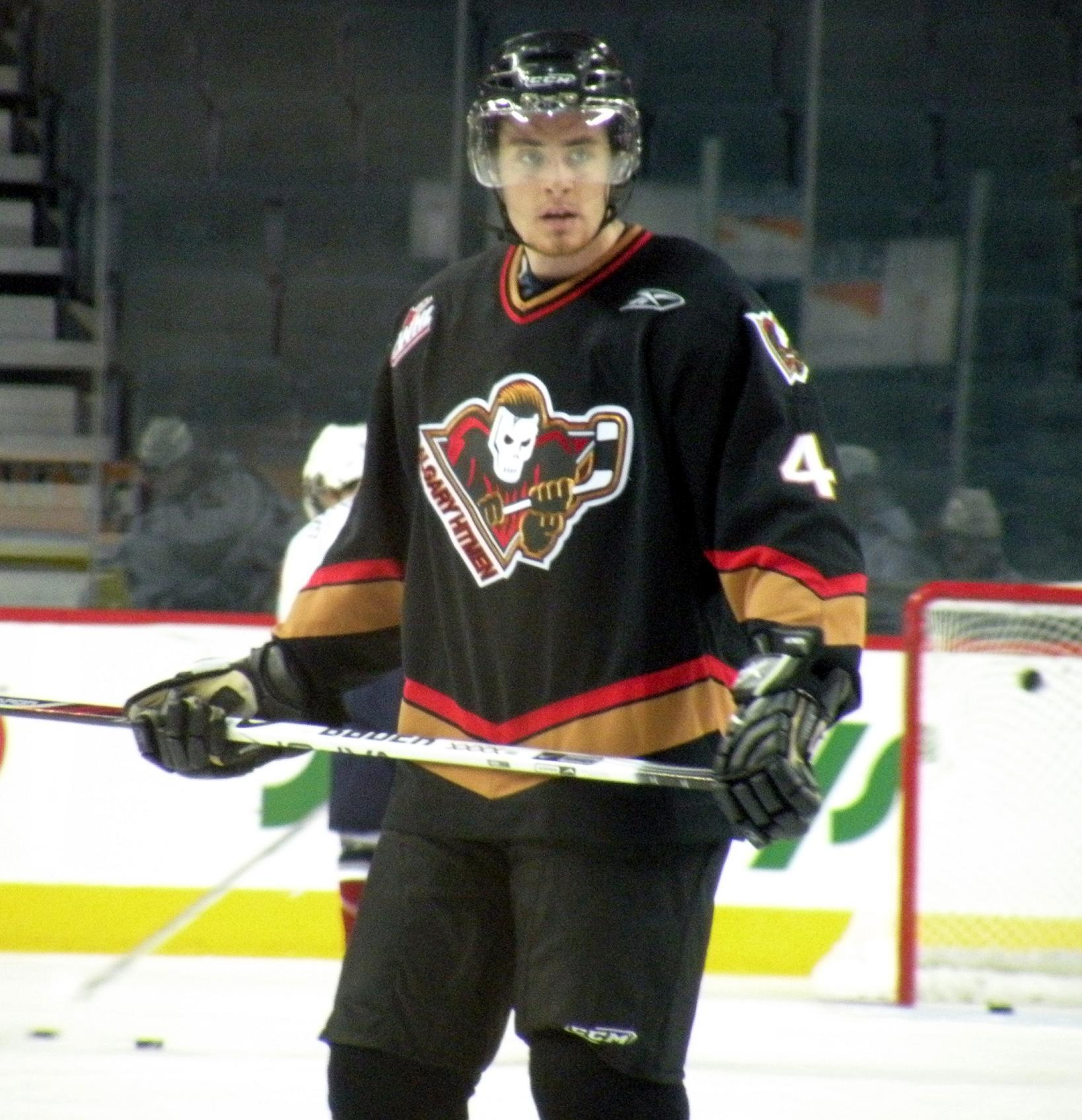
Plante with the Calgary Hitmen in 2008

Plante played junior hockey for the Calgary Hitmen of the Western Hockey League (WHL). The Hitmen selected him with their second-round pick, 21st overall, in the 2004 WHL Bantam Draft. He established himself as a regular on Calgary's blue line in 2005–06, playing in 54 games. He appeared in 58 more in 2006–07 and attracted greater attention from NHL scouts in the 2007 playoffs, scoring 11 points in 13 games. As a result, the Edmonton Oilers selected him 15th overall in the 2007 NHL entry draft, a higher position than he was initially expected to go.

Several injuries limited Plante to 36 games in 2007–08 and he failed to report to Calgary's training camp prior to the 2008–09 WHL season, claiming that the team had treated him poorly the previous year. While he initially demanded a trade out of Calgary, Plante ultimately recanted and returned to the Hitmen early in the season. He rebounded from his "nightmare season" in 2007–08 to rank among the leaders of the Hitmen defence with 45 points in the regular season and another 15 in the playoffs before Calgary was upset in the league championship series by the Kelowna Rockets.

The Oilers signed Plante to a three-year contract following the season. He began his professional career in 2009–10 with Edmonton's top minor league affiliate, the Springfield Falcons of the American Hockey League (AHL). Several injuries on Edmonton's defence led the Oilers to recall Plante, and he made his NHL debut on February 1, 2010, against the Carolina Hurricanes and recorded an assist. He was returned to Springfield as injured players returned to the Oilers' lineup.

On July 18, 2013, Plante was signed as a free agent to his first European contract on a one-year deal with Dornbirner EC of the Austrian Hockey League. He joined Anyang Halla of the Asia League Ice Hockey in 2015, and gained South Korean citizenship in 2017.

== Career statistics ==
=== Regular season and playoffs ===
			Regular season					Playoffs
Season	Team	League	GP	G	A	Pts	PIM	GP	G	A	Pts	PIM
2004–05	Calgary Hitmen	WHL	8	0	0	0	6	11	0	0	0	17
2005–06	Calgary Hitmen	WHL	54	1	3	4	72	13	0	0	0	6
2006–07	Calgary Hitmen	WHL	58	8	30	38	81	13	5	6	11	14
2007–08	Calgary Hitmen	WHL	36	1	1	2	28	15	0	4	4	10
2008–09	Calgary Hitmen	WHL	68	8	37	45	157	18	6	9	15	41
2009–10	Springfield Falcons	AHL	49	2	7	9	122	—	—	—	—	—
2009–10	Edmonton Oilers	NHL	4	0	1	1	2	—	—	—	—	—
2010–11	Oklahoma City Barons	AHL	73	2	15	17	138	5	0	0	0	12
2010–11	Edmonton Oilers	NHL	3	0	0	0	11	—	—	—	—	—
2011–12	Oklahoma City Barons	AHL	41	1	13	14	84	14	0	1	1	26
2011–12	Edmonton Oilers	NHL	3	0	1	1	2	—	—	—	—	—
2012–13	Oklahoma City Barons	AHL	49	1	2	3	114	2	0	0	0	2
2013–14	Dornbirner EC	EBEL	54	3	10	13	81	6	0	1	1	11
2014–15	Lørenskog IK	NOR	43	6	9	15	189	5	0	0	0	4
2015–16	Anyang Halla	ALH	48	6	18	24	52	8	0	1	1	0
2016–17	Anyang Halla	ALH	48	12	12	24	56	6	0	1	1	2
2017–18	Anyang Halla	ALH	24	2	6	8	49	8	1	4	5	4
2018–19	Anyang Halla	ALH	33	1	4	5	62	4	0	1	1	4
2019–20	Anyang Halla	ALH	36	5	14	19	56	2	0	1	1	0
AHL totals			212	6	37	43	458	21	0	1	1	40
NHL totals			10	0	2	2	15	—	—	—	—	—
ALH totals			189	26	54	80	275	28	1	8	9	10

=== International ===
Year	Team	Event	Result	GP	G	A	Pts	PIM
2006	Canada West	U17	7th	5	0	2	2	6
2017	South Korea	WC D1A	18th	5	2	1	3	4
2018	South Korea	OG	12th	4	0	0	0	2
2018	South Korea	WC	16th	7	0	0	0	10
2019	South Korea	WC D1A	19th	5	0	2	2	4
Senior totals				21	2	3	5	20

Awards and achievements
Preceded by Sam Gagner	Edmonton Oilers first round pick 2007 (second of three)	Succeeded by Riley Nash
