= Tyson Sexsmith =

Canadian ice hockey player

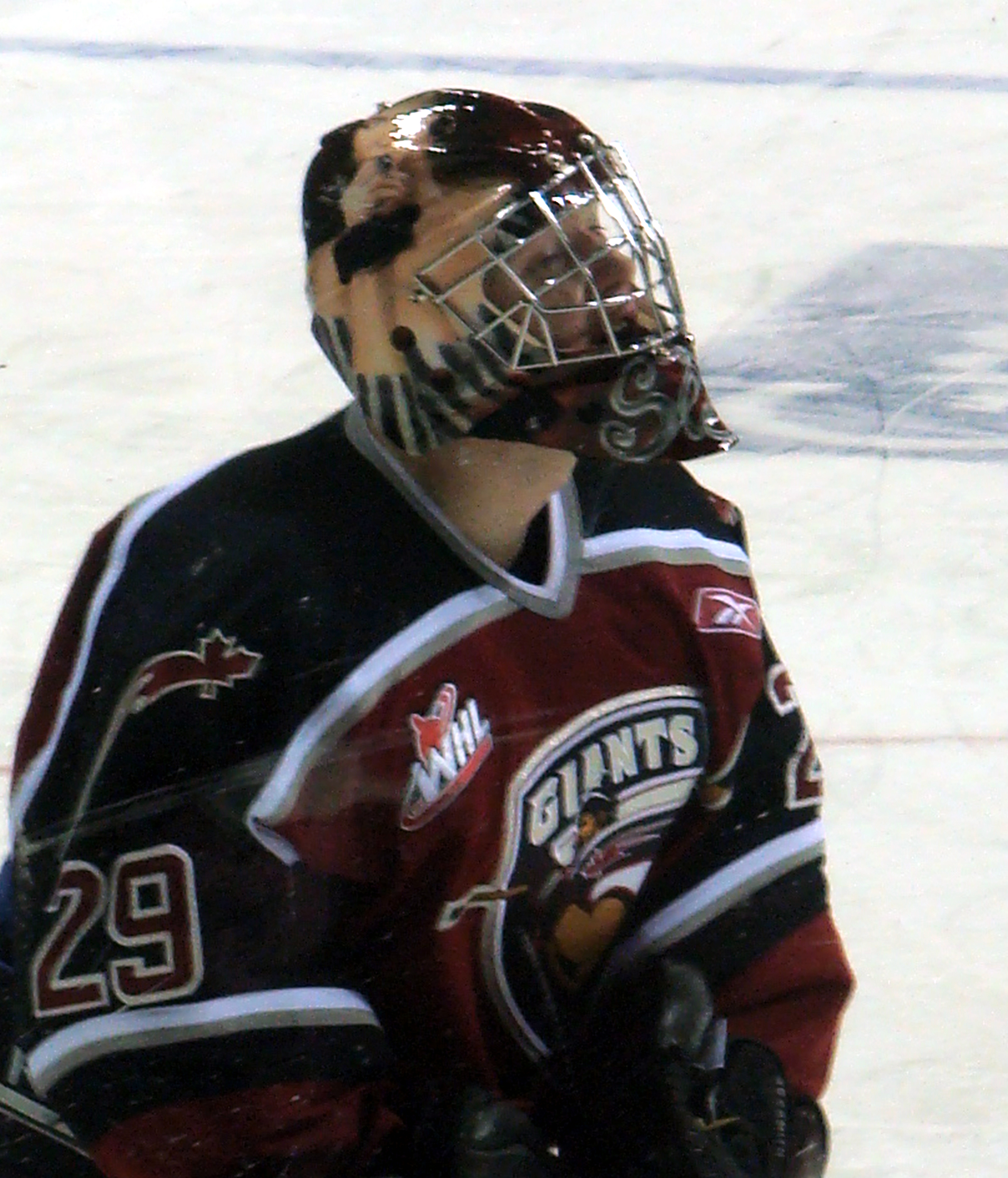
- Sexsmith with the Vancouver Giants in 2007
- Born: March 19, 1989 (age 37) Priddis, Alberta, Canada
- Height: 5 ft 11 in (180 cm)
- Weight: 212 lb (96 kg; 15 st 2 lb)
- Position: Goaltender
- Caught: Left
- Played for: Worcester Sharks; Kalamazoo Wings; Stockton Thunder; Metallurg Novokuznetsk; HCB South Tyrol
- NHL draft: 91st overall, 2007; San Jose Sharks
- Playing career: 2009–2013

Tyson Sexsmith (born March 19, 1989) is a Canadian former professional ice hockey goaltender. Sexsmith was selected by the San Jose Sharks in the 3rd round (91st overall) of the 2007 NHL entry draft. During his major junior career with the Vancouver Giants, Sexsmith has won a President's Cup as Western Hockey League (WHL) champions in 2005–06 and a Memorial Cup in 2007. He is tied for the WHL's all-time shutout record holder with 26 in his four-year career, tied with Carter Hart.

== Playing career ==
Sexsmith made his major junior debut in the WHL during the 2004–05 season, playing a total of three games with the Medicine Hat Tigers and Vancouver Giants. After playing in the backup position with the Giants the next season, Sexsmith emerged as the starting goalie in 2006–07 after a goaltending controversy early in the season with Dustin Slade. Slade, who had led the team to a Memorial Cup appearance in 2006, began splitting time with Sexsmith, who, with his comparable play, began challenging Slade's starting position. Consequentially, Slade left the team to seek a professional career, leaving Sexsmith as the undisputed starter.

Sexsmith would go on to complete the season as the league's leader in goals-against-average and would backstop the Giants to their first Memorial Cup. After his Memorial Cup win, Sexsmith was drafted 91st overall (3rd round) in the 2007 NHL entry draft by the San Jose Sharks. He was the first WHL goalie to be taken in the draft that year.

Returning to the Giants upon being drafted, Sexsmith earned an invite to Team Canada's national junior selection camp for the 2008 World Junior Championships. Although he was not selected, Sexsmith went on to lead the WHL in goals-against-average (1.89) for a second straight season, as well as in shutouts, with 9. He was named to the WHL's Second All-Star Team, however the Giants were eliminated in the second round by the eventual 2008 Memorial Cup champions, the Spokane Chiefs.

Near the beginning of the 2008–09 season, Sexsmith recorded his 22nd WHL shutout on November 7, 2008, in a 5-0 win against the Prince George Cougars, passing Bryan Bridges and Leland Irving as the all-time WHL leader in shutouts. The next week, he was named CHL Goaltender of the Week on November 11. Sexsmith finished his third WHL season with a 2.26 GAA and 6 shutouts to give him 26 overall in his WHL career. During the playoffs, Sexsmith earned his second CHL Goaltender of the Week recognition on April 21, 2009, after shutting the Spokane Chiefs out in the seventh game of the second round, then splitting the first two games of the semi-finals against the Kelowna Rockets.

After finishing Juniors, Sexsmith would play three seasons in the San Jose Sharks organization before bouncing between the KHL, the HCB South Tyrol of the Italian Series A hockey league and the Abbotsford Heat. He has not played in a professional game since the end of the 2012-2013 season.

== Personal life ==
Sexsmith was born in Priddis, Alberta, to Tim and Rawn Sexsmith on March 19, 1989.

== Awards ==
- Won the President's Cup as WHL champions with the Vancouver Giants in 2006.
- Won the Memorial Cup as CHL champions with the Vancouver Giants in 2007.
- Named to the WHL West Second All-Star Team in 2008.
- Named CHL Goaltender of the Week on November 11, 2008, and April 21, 2009.

== Records ==
- WHL league record; most shutouts, career - 26 (tied with Carter Hart) (surpassed Bryan Bridges and Leland Irving, 21, on November 7, 2008)

== Career statistics ==
=== Regular season ===
Season	Team	League	GP	W	L	OTL	SOL	MIN	GA	Svs	SO	GAA	SV%
2004–05	Olds Grizzlys	AJHL	62
2004–05	Medicine Hat Tigers	WHL	1	0	0	0	0	4	0	1	0	0.00	1.00
2004–05	Vancouver Giants	WHL	2	1	0	0	0	80	4	27	0	3.00	.871
2005–06	Vancouver Giants	WHL	11	6	3	0	1	547	21	178	1	2.30	.894
2006–07	Vancouver Giants	WHL	51	31	12	2	6	3047	91	975	10	1.79	.915
2007–08	Vancouver Giants	WHL	62	43	11	2	6	3678	116	1191	9	1.89	.911
2008–09	Vancouver Giants	WHL	52	39	9	2	2	3109	117	1029	6	2.26	.898
2009–10	Worcester Sharks	AHL	13	4	6	0	0	716	47	289	1	3.94	.860
2009–10	Kalamazoo Wings	ECHL	2	2	0	0	0	120	5	68	0	2.50	.932
2010–11	Stockton Thunder	ECHL	17	10	3	1	2	1029	47	417	1	2.74	.899
2010–11	Worcester Sharks	AHL	6	2	3	0	1	367	18	166	0	2.94	.902
2011–12	Worcester Sharks	AHL	34	13	12	0	7	1983	77	845	0	2.33	.916
2012–13	Metallurg Novokuznetsk	KHL	4	1	1	0	0	146	8	55	0	3.28	.873
WHL totals			179	120	35	6	14	10465	349	3401	26	2.00	.907

=== Playoffs ===
Year	Team	League	GP	W	L	OTL	MIN	GA	Svs	SO	GAA	SV%
2007	Vancouver Giants	WHL	22	14	3	4	1339	40	426	4	1.79	.914
2008	Vancouver Giants	WHL	11	7	4	0	658	20	268	0	1.82	.930
2011	Stockton Thunder	ECHL	4	1	2	0	222	11	97	0	2.98	.898
WHL totals			33	21	7	4	1997	60	694	4	1.86	.920

All stats taken from Tyson Sexsmith player profile at NHL.com and WHL profile
