= Justin Pogge =

Canadian ice hockey goaltender

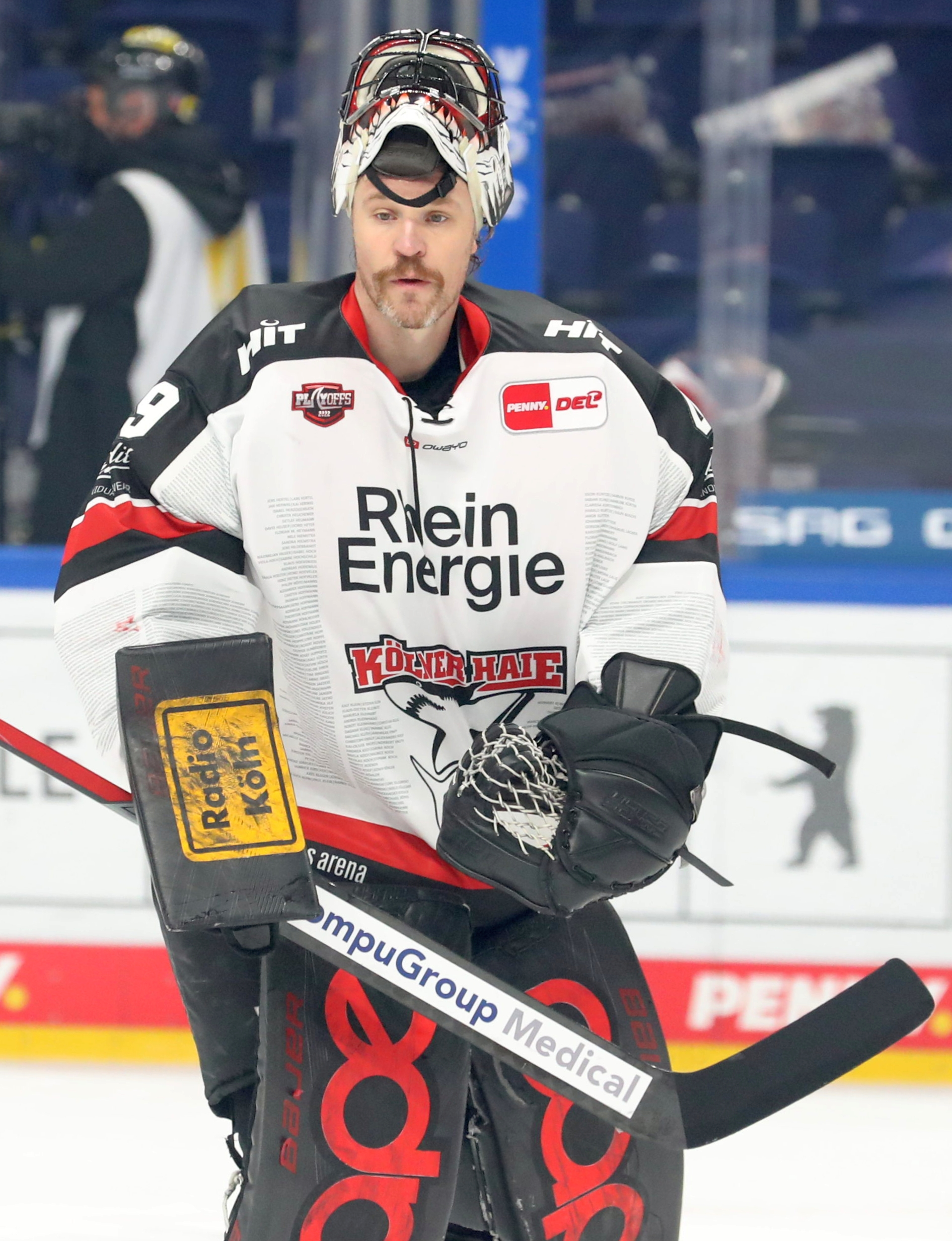
- Pogge in 2022
- Born: April 22, 1986 (age 40) Fort McMurray, Alberta, Canada
- Height: 6 ft 4 in (193 cm)
- Weight: 204 lb (93 kg; 14 st 8 lb)
- Position: Goaltender
- Caught: Left
- Played for: Toronto Maple Leafs; Ritten/Renon; BIK Karlskoga; Färjestad BK; HC Slovan Bratislava; Rögle BK; Eisbären Berlin; Kölner Haie; Grizzlys Wolfsburg
- NHL draft: 90th overall, 2004; Toronto Maple Leafs
- Playing career: 2006–2023

Justin Pogge (/ˈpoʊɡi/; born April 22, 1986) is a Canadian former professional ice hockey goaltender. He played in the National Hockey League (NHL) with the Toronto Maple Leafs during the 2008–09 season.

Pogge spent seven seasons playing for the Prince George Cougars and the Calgary Hitmen of the Western Hockey League (WHL) and the Toronto Marlies of the American Hockey League (AHL) before joining the Leafs in 2008. He played in seven games during his lone NHL season with the Leafs before spending the next five seasons in minor leagues. Beginning in 2012, he began playing for several different teams in various European leagues as a journeyman player before retiring in 2023. He has since begun a coaching career.

Internationally Pogge played for the Canadian national junior team at the 2006 World Junior Championship, winning a gold medal. He also won a silver medal representing Canada during the 2006 Spengler Cup.

== Playing career ==
Pogge played his first one-and-a-half seasons in the Western Hockey League (WHL) with the Prince George Cougars before being dealt to the Calgary Hitmen at the 2004–05 trade deadline. After his rookie season with the Cougars, he was drafted in the third round, 90th overall, by the Toronto Maple Leafs in the 2004 NHL entry draft. He was then signed to a three-year, entry-level contract by the Leafs on December 19, 2005. Playing for the Hitmen in 2005–06, Pogge was awarded the Four Broncos Memorial Trophy as league MVP as well as the CHL Goaltender of the Year Award and Del Wilson Trophy as the top WHL goaltender with a 1.72 goals against average (GAA) and 11 shutouts.

Pogge turned pro in 2006–07 with the Maple Leafs American Hockey League affiliate, the Toronto Marlies. He received his first call-up to the Maple Leafs on January 11, 2008, but did not suit up and was reassigned to the Marlies the next day. Recording 19 wins and a 3.03 GAA in his professional rookie season, he was awarded the Marlies Fan Choice Award.

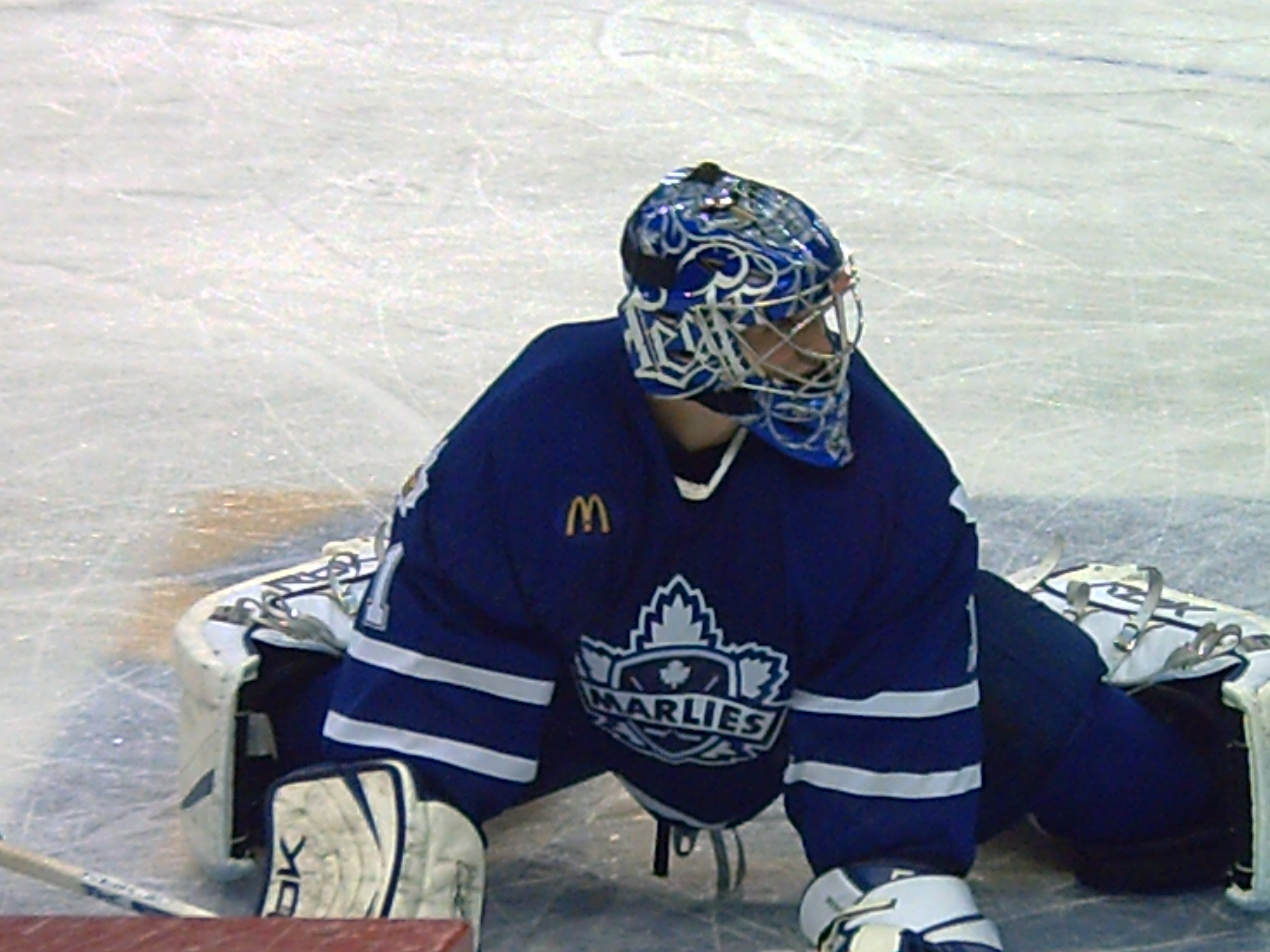
Pogge with the Toronto Marlies in 2007

The following season, on December 21, 2008, Pogge earned another call-up from the Marlies and made his first NHL start against the Atlanta Thrashers the next night, recording a win in a 6–2 victory. On January 27, 2009, he suffered his first loss in the NHL versus the Minnesota Wild 6–1.

On August 10, 2009, Pogge was traded to the Anaheim Ducks for a conditional 2011 draft pick. On March 3, 2010, he was again traded to the Carolina Hurricanes as part of a deal that sent Aaron Ward to the Ducks.

On July 27, 2011, Pogge signed a one-year contract with the Phoenix Coyotes. He played for their AHL affiliate, the Portland Pirates for the duration of the season.

On July 18, 2012, Pogge decided to leave North American professional hockey and signed his first European contract with Ritten Sport of the Elite.A, a top-level team in Italy, for the duration of the 2012–13 season.

Pogge then left for Sweden and signed a one-year contract with BIK Karlskoga in the HockeyAllsvenskan for the duration of the 2013–14 season.

On April 28, 2014, Pogge opted to remain in Sweden, and at an elevated level after signing a contract with Färjestad BK of the SHL. He left Färjestad after completing the 2015–16 season and signed with HC Slovan Bratislava of the Kontinental Hockey League (KHL) in May 2016.

After leaving Kölner Haie after two seasons, Pogge was signed to a one-year contract with his third DEL club, Grizzlys Wolfsburg, on July 26, 2022.

== Post-playing career ==
On May 18, 2023, Pogge announced his retirement from professional hockey. He was in the midst of working as a goaltending consultant for Canada at the World Championship, and had earlier worked in the same role for the team at the World U18 Championships.

Pogge worked as a goaltending consultant for the Columbus Blue Jackets during the 2023-24 season.

On August 26, 2024, the Abbotsford Canucks hired Pogge as their goaltending coach.

== International play ==
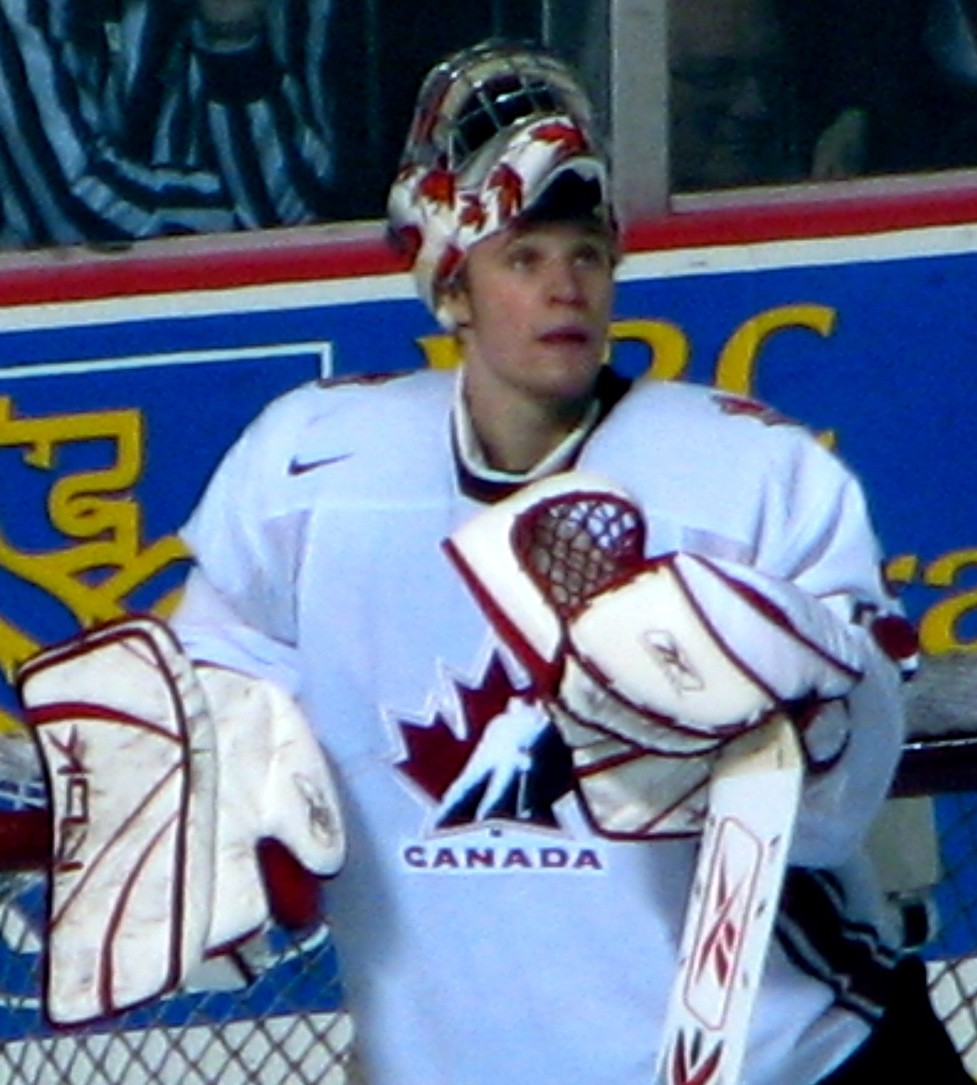

Medal record

Representing Canada

Ice hockey

World Junior Championships
Gold medal – first place	2006 Vancouver	

Spengler Cup
Silver medal – second place	2006 Davos	

In his third and final year of major junior, Pogge was named to Canada's national junior team for the 2006 World Junior Championships as the host nation in Vancouver, British Columbia. He was initially not invited to Canada's junior summer camp and was, therefore, not expected to make the team. However, Pogge was named to the team's final selection camp in December and earned the starting position. He led Team Canada to a second straight gold medal by posting a shutout with 35 saves against Russia in the 5–0 gold medal game victory. Pogge finished the tournament with 3 shutouts and a 1.00 GAA.

Later that year, during Pogge's professional rookie season with the Toronto Marlies, he represented Canada at the 2006 Spengler Cup in Davos, Switzerland. He helped Canada to the final game, where they lost to HC Davos 3–2. Pogge was criticized for surrendering the game winning goal after misplaying the puck behind his net, giving it away to the HC Davos player Andres Ambuhl.

== Personal life ==
Pogge married his fiancé Christina Heinzel in May 2013.

== Career statistics ==
=== Regular season and playoffs ===
			Regular season										Playoffs
Season	Team	League	GP	W	L	T	OTL	MIN	GA	SO	GAA	SV%	GP	W	L	MIN	GA	SO	GAA	SV%
2003–04	Prince George Cougars	WHL	44	17	18	2	—	2271	107	3	2.83	.900	—	—	—	—	—	—	—	—
2004–05	Prince George Cougars	WHL	24	10	9	2	—	1198	56	4	2.80	.891	—	—	—	—	—	—	—	—
2004–05	Calgary Hitmen	WHL	29	14	12	3	—	1727	66	2	2.29	.917	12	7	5	741	24	1	1.94	.928
2005–06	Calgary Hitmen	WHL	54	38	10	—	6	3237	93	11	1.72	.926	13	7	6	802	34	2	2.54	.911
2006–07	Toronto Marlies	AHL	48	19	25	—	2	2812	142	3	3.03	.896	—	—	—	—	—	—	—	—
2007–08	Toronto Marlies	AHL	41	26	10	—	4	2415	94	4	2.34	.908	4	1	1	172	6	0	2.09	.918
2008–09	Toronto Marlies	AHL	53	26	21	—	5	3155	142	0	2.70	.895	5	2	3	304	16	0	3.15	.901
2008–09	Toronto Maple Leafs	NHL	7	1	4	—	1	372	27	0	4.36	.844	—	—	—	—	—	—	—	—
2009–10	Bakersfield Condors	ECHL	9	6	2	—	0	491	22	1	2.69	.902	—	—	—	—	—	—	—	—
2009–10	San Antonio Rampage	AHL	23	12	7	—	3	1332	57	1	2.57	.920	—	—	—	—	—	—	—	—
2009–10	Albany River Rats	AHL	4	1	0	—	2	199	8	0	2.41	.928	—	—	—	—	—	—	—	—
2010–11	Charlotte Checkers	AHL	11	22	18	—	4	2617	136	0	3.12	.907	4	1	1	155	8	0	4.65	.803
2011–12	Portland Pirates	AHL	37	14	13	—	4	1972	101	0	3.07	.890	—	—	—	—	—	—	—	—
2012–13	Ritten Sport	ITA	44	29	15	—	6	2629	104	6	2.37	.925	7	3	4	429	18	1	2.25	.923
2013–14	BIK Karlskoga	Allsv	51	29	22	—	0	3086	111	8	2.16	.920	—	—	—	—	—	—	—	—
2014–15	Färjestad BK	SHL	30	13	13	—	0	1641	55	4	2.01	.926	1	0	1	62	4	0	3.92	.826
2015–16	Färjestad BK	SHL	26	14	12	—	0	1512	53	1	2.10	.922	4	1	3	232	8	0	2.07	.933
2016-17	Slovan Bratislava	KHL	23	7	13	—	1	1192	62	0	3.12	.903	—	—	—	—	—	—	—	—
2017–18	Rögle BK	SHL	32	13	18	—	0	1793	96	1	3.21	.897	—	—	—	—	—	—	—	—
2018–19	Rögle BK	SHL	37	18	17	—	0	2097	89	1	2.55	.911	2	0	2	132	8	0	3.65	.869
2019–20	Södertälje SK	Allsv	10	6	4	—	0	605	24	2	2.38	.905	—	—	—	—	—	—	—	—
2019–20	Eisbären Berlin	DEL	17	11	5	—	0	981	38	1	2.33	.918	—	—	—	—	—	—	—	—
2020–21	Kölner Haie	DEL	21	8	11	—	0	1149	59	2	3.08	.903	—	—	—	—	—	—	—	—
2021–22	Kölner Haie	DEL	38	17	18	—	0	2194	96	3	2.63	.901	5	2	3	288	14	0	2.92	.914
2022–23	Grizzlys Wolfsburg	DEL	18	9	7	—	0	1029	47	1	2.74	.905	—	—	—	—	—	—	—	—
NHL totals			7	1	4	—	1	372	27	0	4.36	.844	—	—	—	—	—	—	—	—

=== International ===
Year	Team	Event	GP	W	L	MIN	GA	SO	GAA	SV%
2006	Canada	WJC	6	6	0	360	6	3	1.00	.952
Junior totals			6	6	0	360	6	3	1.00	.952

== Awards and honours ==
- Won a World Junior Championships gold medal with Canada in 2006.
- Named the CHL Goaltender of the Year in 2006.
- Awarded the Del Wilson Trophy (top goaltender in the WHL) in 2006.
- Awarded the Four Broncos Memorial Trophy (player of the year in the WHL) in 2006.
- Named to the WHL East First All-Star Team in 2006.
- Awarded the Toronto Marlies Fan Choice Award in 2007.

Awards and achievements
Preceded by Jeff Glass	Winner of the WHL Del Wilson Trophy; 2006	Succeeded by Carey Price
Preceded by Eric Fehr	Winner of the WHL Four Broncos Memorial Trophy; 2006	Succeeded by Kris Russell
Preceded by Jeff Glass	Winner of the CHL Goaltender of the Year Award; 2006	Succeeded by Carey Price
