= Leland Irving =

Canadian ice hockey player (born 1988)

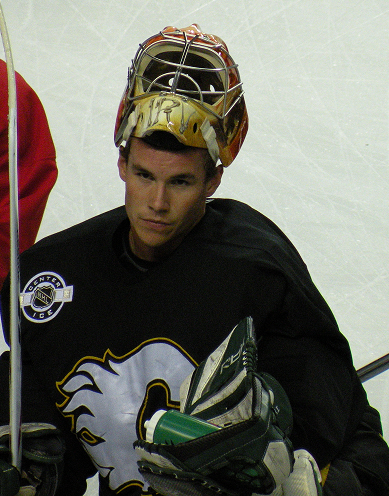
- Irving with the Calgary Flames in 2006
- Born: April 11, 1988 (age 38) Barrhead, Alberta, Canada
- Height: 6 ft 0 in (183 cm)
- Weight: 177 lb (80 kg; 12 st 9 lb)
- Position: Goaltender
- Catches: Left
- team Former teams: Free Agent; Calgary Flames; Jokerit; Salavat Yulaev Ufa; KooKoo; HC Bolzano; HC Lugano
- NHL draft: 26th overall, 2006; Calgary Flames
- Playing career: 2008–present

Leland Bruce Irving (born April 11, 1988) is a Canadian professional ice hockey goaltender, currently an unrestricted free agent. He most recently played for HC Lugano in the National League (NL). He was a first-round selection of the Calgary Flames, 26th overall at the 2006 NHL entry draft, and played parts of two National Hockey League (NHL) seasons with the team. He made his NHL debut on December 16, 2011, in a shootout loss to the Florida Panthers and won his first NHL game one week later in his second start, against the Vancouver Canucks.

== Early life ==
As an eight-year-old, Irving was diagnosed with rhabdomyosarcoma, a rare cancer, when a bump resembling an insect bite above his left ear was found to be cancerous. He endured 13 months of chemotherapy to overcome the illness. He continued to play minor hockey throughout his ordeal, and missed only one practice and one game.

As he grew older, he worked over the summers with the excavation company his father Bruce operated in his hometown of Swan Hills, Alberta.

== Playing career ==
Irving was drafted in the first round, 26th overall, in the 2006 NHL entry draft by the Calgary Flames. He played five seasons of major junior hockey in the Western Hockey League (WHL) with the Everett Silvertips. The 2007–08 WHL season was his fifth and final season with the Silvertips; he played 56 games and sported a 2.45 goals against average. He finished his WHL career tied with Bryan Bridges for the league's record for career shutouts with 21 (he was later surpassed the following season by Tyson Sexsmith of the Vancouver Giants).

On January 18, 2007, Irving was signed by the Flames to an entry-level contract. On April 22, 2007, he was assigned to the Omaha Ak-Sar-Ben Knights of the American Hockey League (AHL). He practised with the club and dressed in two of the final playoff games behind starter Curtis McElhinney. For the 2008–09 season, Irving was assigned to the Quad City Flames, Calgary's AHL affiliate.

An injury to the Flames' backup goaltender Henrik Karlsson led to Irving's recall on December 5, 2011. At the time he was assigned to Calgary, he was the AHL leader in wins (15), shutouts (3), and minutes played (1254). He made his NHL debut on December 16, a 3–2 shootout loss to the Florida Panthers. Irving made 39 saves in the game and was named third star. He earned his first win in his second start, a 3–1 victory over the Vancouver Canucks, on December 23.

A restricted free agent following the season, Irving publicly considered signing in Europe if he couldn't get a one-way contract from the Flames, but chose to return to Calgary on a one-year, two-way deal worth $687,500 for an NHL season. Irving returned to Abbotsford for the start of the 2012–13 AHL season due to the NHL labour dispute. However, a slow start coupled with the outstanding play of Barry Brust and Danny Taylor relegated him to the team's third-string goaltender.

When NHL play resumed, Irving beat out Karlsson for the job as Flames backup goaltender, but a knee injury to Kiprusoff early in the season elevated him to Calgary's starter. He struggled in the Calgary net and was demoted back to Abbotsford after playing only six games. He posted a 2–1–1 record with a 3.33 GAA and .833 save percentage.

The Flames chose not to sign Irving, who was an unrestricted free agent following the season, to a new contract. Irving opted to go to Finland, signing a tryout agreement with Jokerit of the Liiga. Irving assumed established himself in the starting goaltender role, appearing in 55 games to post 23 wins.

With Jokerit moving to the Russian Kontinental Hockey League, Irving was not re-signed and was again a free agent. On September 9, 2014, Irving was announced to have accepted a professional try-out contract to attend the Tampa Bay Lightning 2014 training camp. Just three days later, Irving opted to decline the Lightning invite in signing a one-year contract in the KHL with Russian club, Salavat Yulaev Ufa.

As a free agent following the completion of his contract with Ufa, Irving returned to North America by agreeing to a one-year contract with the Iowa Wild of the AHL on October 9, 2015. Despite backstopping a languishing team in Iowa, Irving produced a respectable season with 12 in 41 games. As a free agent, Irving decided to play a second stint in Finland with Liiga outfit, KooKoo for the 2016–17 season.

On August 31, 2017, Irving agreed to a one-year AHL contract with the Lehigh Valley Phantoms. Before appearing in a game with the Phantoms, Irving was traded to start the 2017–18 season to the San Diego Gulls in considerations of an NHL trade of Dustin Tokarski from the Anaheim Ducks to Philadelphia Flyers on October 9, 2017.

On June 22, 2018, Irving left North America as a free agent after agreeing to a one-year contract with Italian outfit, HCB South Tyrol, who participate in the Austrian Hockey League (EBEL).

== International play ==
Medal record

Representing Canada

Men's ice hockey

World U-17 Hockey Challenge
Silver medal – second place	2005 Alberta	

World Junior Hockey Championships
Gold medal – first place	2007 Sweden	

In June 2007, Irving was named to Team Canada as one of three rotating goalies for the 2007 Super Series between Canada and Russia's national under-20 teams. He made his first appearance in the series, starting game 3 on August 31, 2007. He stopped 32 of 34 shots on goal and was awarded as Canada's Player of the Game. Canada defeated Russia 7-0-1 in eight games. He was a member of Canada's gold-medal winning team at the 2007 World Junior Championships, but did not appear in a game, as Carey Price played the entire tournament. As a player eligible to return for the 2008 tournament, he was expected to make the team but was instead passed over by the coaches.

== Personal life ==
Irving is married to Ashley Irving, and they have three daughters.

== Career statistics ==
			Regular season									Playoffs
Season	Team	League	GP	W	L	T/OTL	MIN	GA	SO	GAA	SV%	GP	W	L	MIN	GA	SO	GAA	SV%
2003–04	Everett Silvertips	WHL	1	0	0	0	8	0	0	0.00	1.000	3	1	0	104	2	0	1.15	.967
2004–05	Everett Silvertips	WHL	23	9	8	1	1132	34	2	1.80	.930	—	—	—	—	—	—	—	—
2005–06	Everett Silvertips	WHL	67	37	22	4	3791	121	4	1.91	.925	12	8	3	747	21	3	1.68	.938
2006–07	Everett Silvertips	WHL	48	34	9	3	2802	87	11	1.86	.929	12	6	5	639	30	0	2.82	.887
2007–08	Everett Silvertips	WHL	56	27	24	3	3258	133	4	2.45	.919	3	0	3	139	10	0	4.30	.882
2008–09	Quad City Flames	AHL	47	24	18	2	2658	99	1	2.23	.912	—	—	—	—	—	—	—	—
2009–10	Abbotsford Heat	AHL	35	14	17	2	1850	85	1	2.76	.905	1	0	1	14	3	0	12.97	.571
2009–10	Victoria Salmon Kings	ECHL	8	2	4	2	490	25	0	3.06	.908	—	—	—	—	—	—	—	—
2010–11	Abbotsford Heat	AHL	61	30	26	8	3437	40	8	2.30	.913	—	—	—	—	—	—	—	—
2011–12	Abbotsford Heat	AHL	39	22	13	2	2177	97	3	2.67	.902	1	0	1	60	4	0	4.02	.846
2011–12	Calgary Flames	NHL	7	1	3	3	394	21	0	3.20	.912	—	—	—	—	—	—	—	—
2012–13	Abbotsford Heat	AHL	12	3	7	2	599	34	0	3.40	.884	—	—	—	—	—	—	—	—
2012–13	Calgary Flames	NHL	6	2	1	1	270	15	0	3.33	.883	—	—	—	—	—	—	—	—
2013–14	Jokerit	Liiga	55	23	18	12	3193	114	3	2.14	.922	2	0	2	99	7	0	4.26	.877
2014–15	Salavat Yulaev Ufa	KHL	20	2	8	1	841	47	0	3.35	.883	—	—	—	—	—	—	—	—
2015–16	Iowa Wild	AHL	41	12	22	6	2419	108	2	2.68	.913	—	—	—	—	—	—	—	—
2016–17	KooKoo	Liiga	35	11	11	12	2096	76	1	2.18	.923	—	—	—	—	—	—	—	—
2017–18	San Diego Gulls	AHL	6	1	3	0	260	15	0	3.47	.909	—	—	—	—	—	—	—	—
2018–19	HC Bolzano	EBEL	46	22	22	0	2672	115	1	2.55	.920	—	—	—	—	—	—	—	—
2019–20	HC Bolzano	EBEL	40	24	16	0	2421	84	7	2.08	.927	3	3	0	—	—	1	1.33	.963
2020–21	HC Bolzano	ICEHL	24	18	5	0	1387	46	6	1.99	.925	16	9	7	—	—	1	2.46	.910
2021–22	HC Lugano	NL	7	2	5	0	418	23	0	3.30	.879	—	—	—	—	—	—	—	—
2021–22	HCB Ticino Rockets	SL	2	2	0	0	119	5	0	2.52	.943	—	—	—	—	—	—	—	—
NHL totals			13	3	4	4	664	36	0	3.25	.902	—	—	—	—	—	—	—	—

== Awards and honours ==
Award	Year
WHL
West Second All-Star Team	2006, 2007

Awards and achievements
Preceded by Matt Pelech	Calgary Flames' first-round draft pick 2006	Succeeded by Mikael Backlund
