= Eric Fehr =

Canadian ice hockey player (born 1985)

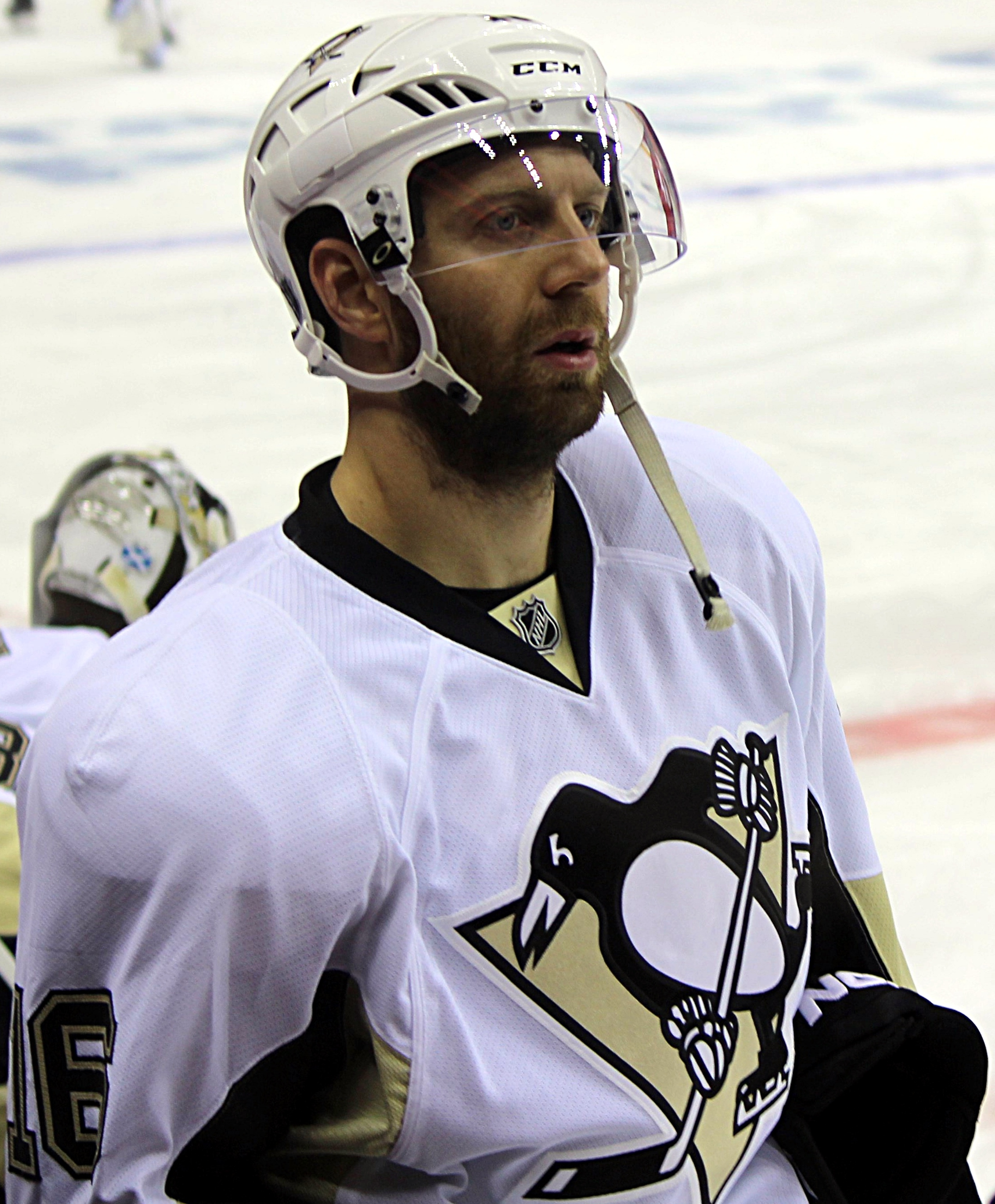
- Fehr with the Pittsburgh Penguins in 2016
- Born: September 7, 1985 (age 40) Winkler, Manitoba, Canada
- Height: 6 ft 4 in (193 cm)
- Weight: 206 lb (93 kg; 14 st 10 lb)
- Position: Centre / Right wing
- Shot: Right
- Played for: Washington Capitals; Winnipeg Jets; HPK; Pittsburgh Penguins; Toronto Maple Leafs; San Jose Sharks; Minnesota Wild; Genève-Servette HC; Ak Bars Kazan
- NHL draft: 18th overall, 2003; Washington Capitals
- Playing career: 2005–2022

Eric Fehr (born September 7, 1985) is a Canadian former professional ice hockey centre. He most recently played under contract with Ak Bars Kazan in the Kontinental Hockey League (KHL). He was drafted in the first round, 18th overall, by the Washington Capitals in the 2003 NHL entry draft. In addition to two separate stints with Washington, Fehr has also played in the National Hockey League (NHL) for the Winnipeg Jets, Pittsburgh Penguins (with whom he won the Stanley Cup in 2016), Toronto Maple Leafs, San Jose Sharks and the Minnesota Wild. Fehr initially ended his professional career after having played two seasons with Genève-Servette HC of the National League (NL) before resuming to play in the KHL.

In 2014, Fehr became a published author, writing an anti-bullying children's book titled "The Bulliest Dozer". Proceeds from book sales benefited charity.

In 2022, after a 17-year professional playing career where he won a Calder Cup, Spengler Cup, and Stanley Cup, Fehr returned to his hometown to join the Winkler Flyers of the Manitoba Junior Hockey League as the team's director of player development.

== Playing career ==
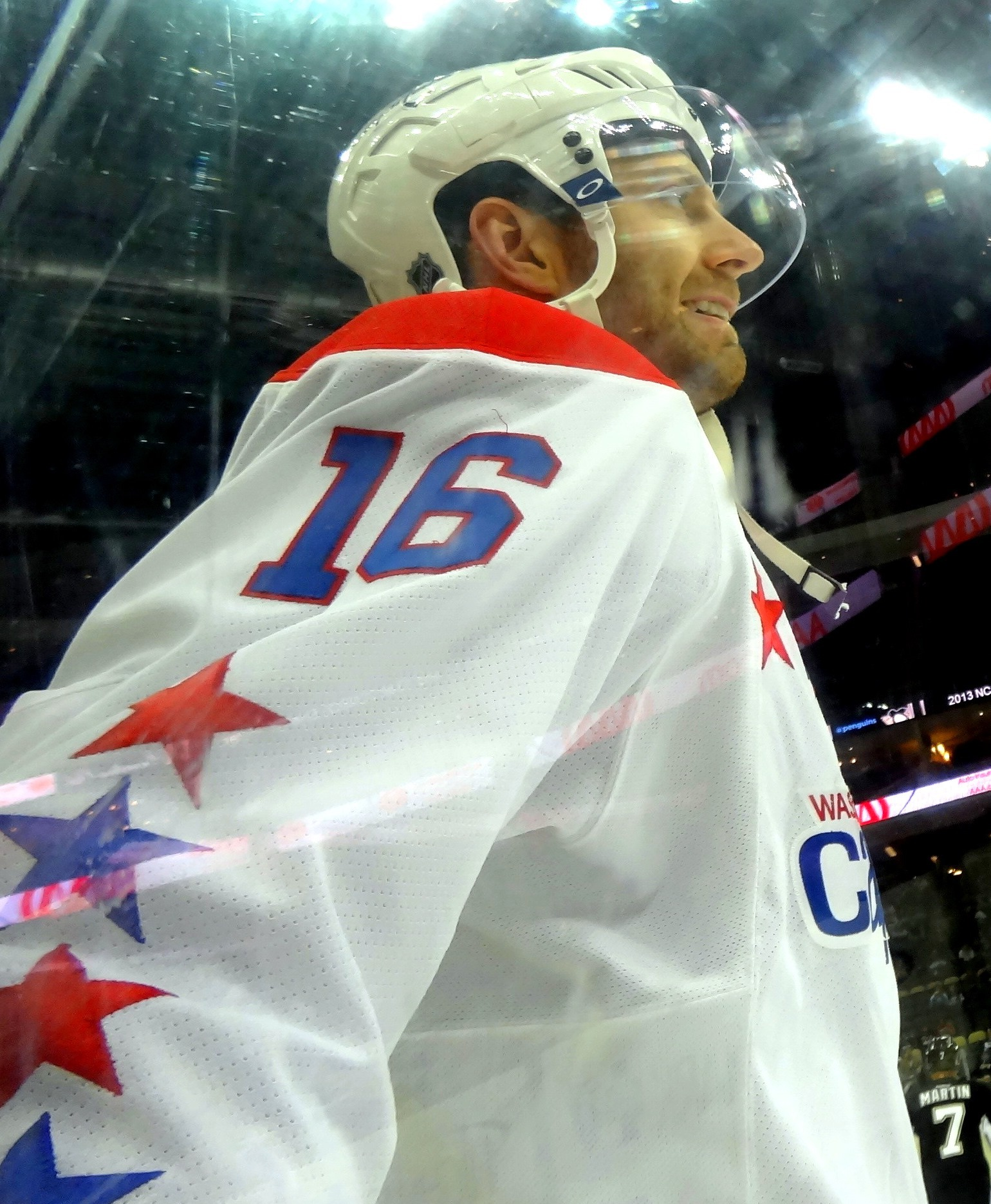
Fehr with the Capitals in 2013.

Fehr was a first-round draft pick in the 2003 NHL entry draft by the Washington Capitals, chosen 18th overall.

Fehr played 11 games with the Capitals in the 2005–06 season, going scoreless with two penalty minutes and an even plus-minus rating. He spent the rest of the season with Washington's American Hockey League (AHL) affiliate, the Hershey Bears, and ultimately returned to Hershey to start the 2006–07 season. He played a brief callup with the Capitals early into the 2006–07 season, and was later recalled again in late January. His first game back with the Capitals came on January 27, 2007; in the same game, Fehr scored his first career NHL goal, which would be the eventual game-winner in the Capitals' 7–3 victory over the Carolina Hurricanes.

Fehr recovered from a herniated disc injury and was called up to the Capitals on February 4, 2008.

On July 8, 2011, Fehr was traded to the Winnipeg Jets in exchange for a fourth-round draft pick in 2012 and prospect Danick Paquette. Fehr underwent surgery on his right shoulder in October 2011 and eventually missed the majority of the season due to recurring problems with the shoulder. Fehr was not given a qualifying offer by the Jets at the end of the 2011–12 season, thereby making him an unrestricted free agent.

Due to the 2012–13 NHL lock-out, Fehr signed his first European contract with HPK of the Finnish SM-liiga on October 23, 2012. He then returned to the Capitals organization after signing a one-year, $600,000 contract on January 13, 2013.

At the conclusion of the 2014–15 season, and as an impending free agent, Fehr underwent elbow surgery for a recovery period of 4–6 months. With his injury delaying his involvement for the following season, Fehr was later signed to a three-year, $6 million contract with the Pittsburgh Penguins on July 28, 2015. Fehr made his debut, after missing the first 10 games of the Penguins season, against the Toronto Maple Leafs on October 31, 2015. He scored a shorthanded goal and added an assist in a 4–0 Penguins victory. He scored another shorthanded goal in the next game, a 3–2 win against the Vancouver Canucks, and thus became the first player in NHL history to score a shorthanded goal in his first two games with a team. In 2016, Fehr won a Stanley Cup with the Penguins.

On February 28, 2017, one day before the trade deadline, Fehr was placed on waivers for the purpose of being sent to the American Hockey League. He had largely played on the Penguins' fourth line, and was seen as a player to bench once several injured Penguins' players returned from injury. In the weeks approaching the deadline, Fehr had been a frequent healthy scratch. He cleared the following day, but was then traded to the Toronto Maple Leafs, alongside Steven Oleksy and a 2017 fourth-round pick, in exchange for Frank Corrado in an effort to clear cap space for the Penguins. Fehr was a healthy scratch for the Maple Leafs for nine games due to a plethora of forwards, but an injury to Nikita Soshnikov on March 20 allowed Fehr to make his season debut two nights later against the Columbus Blue Jackets. Fehr played adequately in his limited role on the fourth line but broke his left hand in the game, effectively ending his season.

Heading into the 2017–18 season, Fehr battled with Dominic Moore, who was signed by Toronto in the off-season, for the fourth-line centre spot. After appearing in four games for the Maple Leafs, Fehr was placed on waivers on October 23, effectively losing the fourth-line centre role to Moore. On November 7, Fehr was loaned to the San Diego Gulls, AHL affiliate of the Anaheim Ducks, by the Toronto Maple Leafs. On February 20, 2018, the Maple Leafs traded Fehr to the San Jose Sharks in exchange for a seventh-round pick in the 2020 draft. On March 12, 2018, Fehr scored his first goal as a San Jose Shark, giving the Sharks a 2–1 lead, in a 5–3 victory against the Detroit Red Wings. Fehr was used in a fourth-line role, adding a physical edge and veteran presence, he appeared in 10 games through the playoffs, posting a goal and assist.

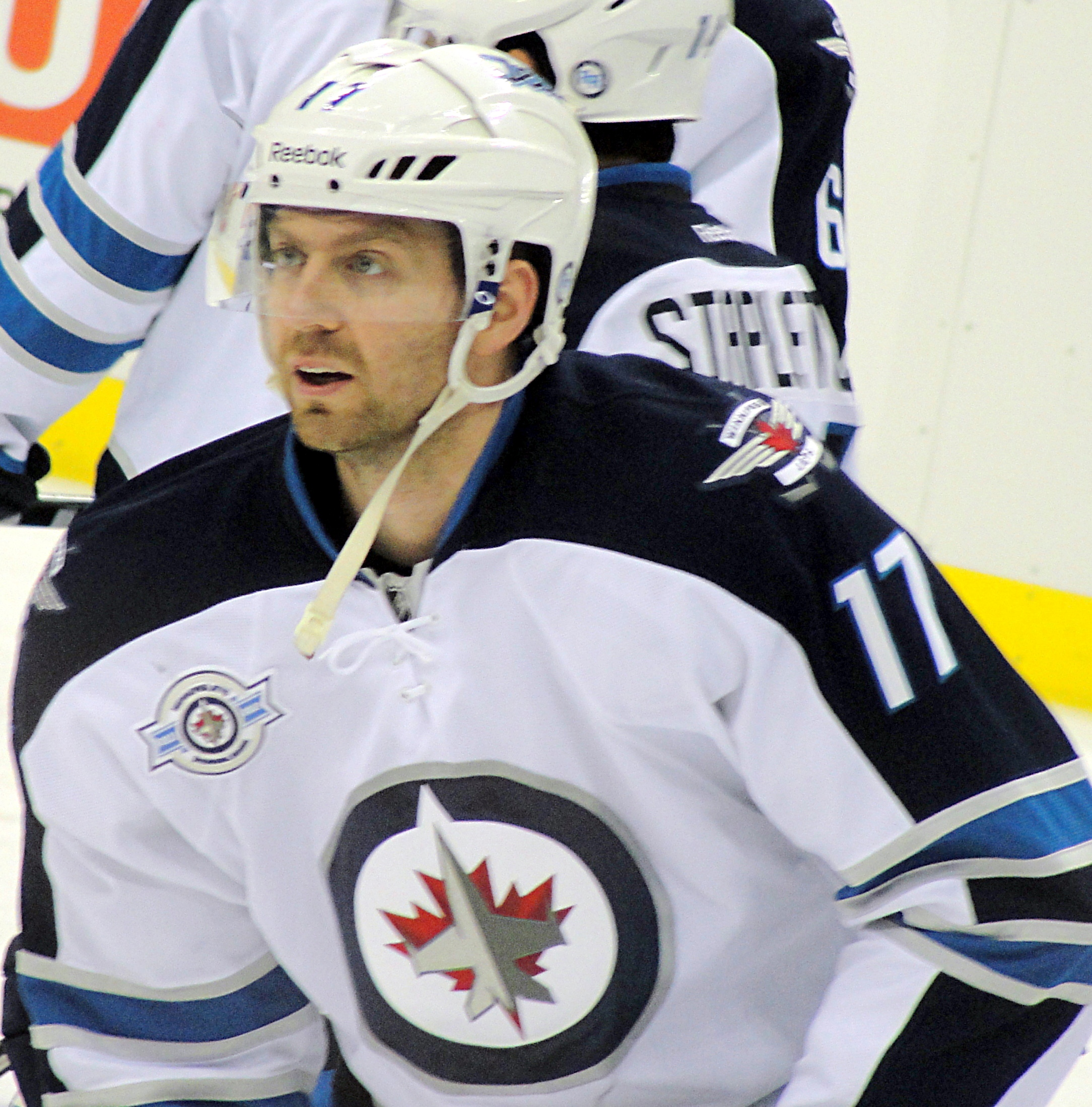
Fehr with the Jets in 2012.

A free agent in the off-season, Fehr left the Sharks and secured a one-year, $1 million contract with the Minnesota Wild on July 1, 2018. Playing on the Wild's fourth line, Fehr featured in 72 games during the 2018–19 season, contributing with 7 goals and 15 points as Minnesota missed the playoffs for the first time in 7 seasons.

As a free agent, Fehr returned to Europe, agreeing to a one-year contract with Swiss club Genève-Servette HC of the NL on July 20, 2019. On May 27, 2020, it was officially announced that Fehr would not return to the team for the 2020-21 season. Despite this announcement, Fehr was brought back to the team on July 13, 2020, agreeing to a one-year deal for the 2020–21 season. He made it to the NL final with Genève-Servette but the team was swept by EV Zug, finishing as runner-up. Fehr retired from professional hockey following the 2021 playoffs.

On December 21, 2021, Fehr returned to the professional circuit, signing a contract with Russian KHL club Ak Bars Kazan for the remainder of the 2021–22 season.

== Career statistics ==
=== Regular season and playoffs ===
			Regular season					Playoffs
Season	Team	League	GP	G	A	Pts	PIM	GP	G	A	Pts	PIM
2000–01	Brandon Wheat Kings	WHL	4	0	0	0	0	—	—	—	—	—
2001–02	Brandon Wheat Kings	WHL	63	11	16	27	29	12	1	1	2	0
2002–03	Brandon Wheat Kings	WHL	70	26	29	55	76	17	4	8	12	26
2003–04	Brandon Wheat Kings	WHL	71	50	34	84	129	7	5	0	5	16
2004–05	Brandon Wheat Kings	WHL	71	59	52	111	91	24	16	16	32	47
2005–06	Hershey Bears	AHL	70	25	28	53	70	19	8	3	11	8
2005–06	Washington Capitals	NHL	11	0	0	0	2	—	—	—	—	—
2006–07	Hershey Bears	AHL	40	22	19	41	63	—	—	—	—	—
2006–07	Washington Capitals	NHL	14	2	1	3	8	—	—	—	—	—
2007–08	Hershey Bears	AHL	11	3	4	7	4	2	1	3	4	2
2007–08	Washington Capitals	NHL	23	1	5	6	6	5	1	0	1	0
2008–09	Washington Capitals	NHL	61	12	13	25	22	9	0	0	0	0
2009–10	Washington Capitals	NHL	69	21	18	39	24	7	3	1	4	4
2010–11	Washington Capitals	NHL	52	10	10	20	16	5	1	0	1	0
2011–12	Winnipeg Jets	NHL	35	2	1	3	12	—	—	—	—	—
2012–13	HPK	SM-l	21	13	12	25	22	—	—	—	—	—
2012–13	Washington Capitals	NHL	41	9	8	17	10	7	0	0	0	6
2013–14	Washington Capitals	NHL	73	13	18	31	32	—	—	—	—	—
2014–15	Washington Capitals	NHL	75	19	14	33	20	4	0	0	0	2
2015–16	Pittsburgh Penguins	NHL	55	8	6	14	19	23	3	1	4	6
2016–17	Pittsburgh Penguins	NHL	52	6	5	11	14	—	—	—	—	—
2016–17	Toronto Maple Leafs	NHL	1	0	0	0	0	—	—	—	—	—
2017–18	Toronto Maple Leafs	NHL	4	0	0	0	2	—	—	—	—	—
2017–18	San Diego Gulls	AHL	34	17	11	28	33	—	—	—	—	—
2017–18	San Jose Sharks	NHL	14	3	1	4	0	10	1	1	2	6
2018–19	Minnesota Wild	NHL	72	7	8	15	30	—	—	—	—	—
2019–20	Genève–Servette HC	NL	44	15	19	34	46	—	—	—	—	—
2020–21	Genève–Servette HC	NL	50	21	21	42	153	11	3	3	6	34
2021–22	Ak Bars Kazan	KHL	5	0	0	0	0	2	1	0	1	0
NHL totals			652	113	102	221	217	70	9	3	12	24

=== International ===
Year	Team	Event	Result	GP	G	A	Pts	PIM
2001	Canada Western	U17	6th	5	0	1	1	20
Junior totals				5	0	1	1	20

== Awards and honours ==
Awards	Year
WHL
East First All-Star Team	2005
AHL
Calder Cup champion	2005–06
NHL
Stanley Cup champion	2016

Awards and achievements
Preceded by Boyd Gordon	Washington Capitals first-round draft pick 2003	Succeeded by Alexander Ovechkin
Preceded by Tyler Redenbach	Winner of the WHL Bob Clarke Trophy; 2005	Succeeded by Troy Brouwer
Preceded by Cam Ward	Winner of the WHL Four Broncos Memorial Trophy; 2005	Succeeded by Justin Pogge
