= Martin Šagát =

Slovak ice hockey player

- Born: November 11, 1984 (age 41) Prievidza, Czechoslovakia
- Height: 6 ft 4 in (193 cm)
- Weight: 216 lb (98 kg; 15 st 6 lb)
- Position: Left wing
- Shot: Right
- Metal Ligaen team Former teams: Herning Blue Fox; Dukla Trencin; Toronto Marlies; Elmira Jackals; Slovan Ustecti Lvi; Mlada Boleslav; Dynamo Pardubice; HC Hradec Kralove; Pirati Chomutov; SK Kadan
- NHL draft: 91st overall, 2003; Toronto Maple Leafs
- Playing career: 2005–2020

Martin Šagát (born November 11, 1984) is a Slovak professional ice hockey player currently playing for Herning Blue Fox in the Danish Metal Ligaen. He was drafted 91st overall by the Toronto Maple Leafs in the 2003 NHL entry draft.

Sagat played briefly with Dukla Trencin of the Slovak Extraliga, in 2002–03 before being drafted by the Toronto Maple Leafs in the 2003 NHL entry draft. To be closer to the Maple Leafs, Sagat joined the Kootenay Ice of the Western Hockey League for two years. Sagat then spent to years with Toronto's American Hockey League affiliate, the Toronto Marlies. After only 5 games in the ECHL with the Elmira Jackals in the 2007, Sagat left to continue his career in the Czech Republic, playing for various teams in the Czech Extraliga and the 1st Czech Republic Hockey League.

In August 2015, Sagat left the Czech Republic to join the Herning Blue Fox of the Danish Metal Ligaen.

== Career statistics ==
=== Regular season and playoffs ===
			Regular season					Playoffs
Season	Team	League	GP	G	A	Pts	PIM	GP	G	A	Pts	PIM
2001–02	Dukla Trenčín	SVK U20
2002–03	Dukla Trenčín	SVK U20	23	7	11	18	14	3	1	3	4	4
2002–03	Dukla Trenčín	Slovak	16	0	0	0	0	2	0	0	0	0
2003–04	Kootenay Ice	WHL	57	11	32	43	39	4	0	2	2	2
2004–05	Kootenay Ice	WHL	72	17	46	63	51	16	8	14	22	18
2005–06	Toronto Marlies	AHL	60	13	8	21	22	5	0	0	0	8
2006–07	Toronto Marlies	AHL	71	4	11	15	43	—	—	—	—	—
2007–08	Elmira Jackals	ECHL	5	0	2	2	2	—	—	—	—	—
2007–08	HC Slovan Ústečtí Lvi	ELH	29	2	0	2	16	—	—	—	—	—
2007–08	HC Most	CZE.2	2	0	0	0	0	—	—	—	—	—
2008–09	HC Slovan Ústečtí Lvi	CZE.2	44	18	19	37	22	9	2	2	4	2
2009–10	BK Mladá Boleslav	ELH	13	1	2	3	2	—	—	—	—	—
2009–10	HC Slovan Ústečtí Lvi	CZE.2	36	12	19	31	24	15	3	2	5	6
2010–11	HC Slovan Ústečtí Lvi	CZE.2	35	10	11	21	16	9	4	5	9	6
2011–12	HC Slovan Ústečtí Lvi	CZE.2	46	13	35	48	20	16	5	7	12	6
2011–12	HC ČSOB Pojišťovna Pardubice	ELH	8	1	1	2	2	1	0	0	0	0
2012–13	HC ČSOB Pojišťovna Pardubice	ELH	20	0	2	2	10	—	—	—	—	—
2012–13	Královští lvi Hradec Králové	CZE.2	13	5	5	10	10	—	—	—	—	—
2012–13	Piráti Chomutov	ELH	12	2	2	4	4	—	—	—	—	—
2013–14	Piráti Chomutov	ELH	48	1	7	8	20	—	—	—	—	—
2014–15	Piráti Chomutov	CZE.2	18	4	2	6	6	9	1	4	5	16
2014–15	SK Kadaň	CZE.2	25	18	7	25	39	—	—	—	—	—
2015–16	Herning Blue Fox	DEN	36	4	7	11	8	18	2	5	7	6
2016–17	HC Slavia Praha	CZE.2	25	1	7	8	4	9	3	3	6	8
2017–18	HC Slavia Praha	CZE.2	46	9	16	25	22	8	3	5	8	0
2018–19	HC Slavia Praha	CZE.2	44	4	24	28	65	—	—	—	—	—
2019–20	HC Slavia Praha	CZE.2	5	0	1	1	12	—	—	—	—	—
2019–20	Piráti Chomutov	CZE.2	13	3	1	4	8	—	—	—	—	—
AHL totals			131	17	19	36	65	5	0	0	0	8
ELH totals			130	7	14	21	54	1	0	0	0	0
CZE.2 totals			352	97	147	244	248	75	21	28	49	44

=== International ===
Year	Team	Event	GP	G	A	Pts	PIM
2002	Slovakia	WJC18	8	2	2	4	0
2004	Slovakia	WJC	6	1	0	1	2
Junior totals			14	3	2	5	2
