= Derek Couture =

Canadian professional ice hockey forward

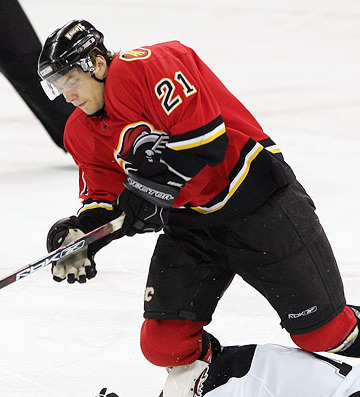
- Couture with the Omaha Ak-Sar-Ben Knights in 2006
- Born: April 24, 1984 (age 42) Calgary, Alberta, Canada
- Height: 6 ft 1 in (185 cm)
- Weight: 205 lb (93 kg; 14 st 9 lb)
- Position: Right wing
- Shot: Right
- Played for: Omaha Ak-Sar-Ben Knights; Quad City Flames; Binghamton Senators; Hartford Wolf Pack; Houston Aeros
- NHL draft: Undrafted
- Playing career: 2005–2015

Derek Couture (born April 24, 1984) is a Canadian former professional ice hockey forward. He captained the Ontario Reign of the ECHL.

== Playing career ==
Couture played four seasons (2000-2005) of major junior hockey in the Western Hockey League with the Saskatoon Blades. Undrafted, he turned professional with the 2005–06 season which he played in the American Hockey League (AHL) with the Omaha Ak-Sar-Ben Knights.

== Personal ==
Retired from hockey in 2015, Derek transitioned into a career in Real Estate. He is a licensed Realtor for the premier Charles Real Estate group and eXp Realty.

== Career statistics ==
			Regular season					Playoffs
Season	Team	League	GP	G	A	Pts	PIM	GP	G	A	Pts	PIM
2000–01	Calgary Northstars Midget AAA	AMHL	36	21	24	45	80	—	—	—	—	—
2000–01	Saskatoon Blades	WHL	7	2	1	3	6	—	—	—	—	—
2001–02	Saskatoon Blades	WHL	61	6	10	16	159	7	0	0	0	10
2002–03	Saskatoon Blades	WHL	70	17	20	37	160	6	1	2	3	13
2003–04	Saskatoon Blades	WHL	45	3	9	12	99	—	—	—	—	—
2004–05	Seattle Thunderbirds	WHL	71	20	18	38	154	12	3	6	9	18
2005–06	Omaha Ak-Sar-Ben Knights	AHL	66	7	12	19	88	—	—	—	—	—
2006–07	Omaha Ak-Sar-Ben Knights	AHL	46	3	6	9	76	6	0	1	1	4
2007–08	Quad City Flames	AHL	76	10	8	18	129	—	—	—	—	—
2008–09	Fehérvár AV19	EBEL	10	1	2	3	97	—	—	—	—	—
2008–09	Binghamton Senators	AHL	18	2	3	5	21	—	—	—	—	—
2008–09	Elmira Jackals	ECHL	21	6	14	20	53	7	1	3	4	37
2009–10	Charlotte Checkers	ECHL	4	0	5	5	6	—	—	—	—	—
2009–10	Hartford Wolf Pack	AHL	67	11	9	20	104	—	—	—	—	—
2010–11	Victoria Salmon Kings	ECHL	25	8	11	19	76	4	1	1	2	2
2010–11	Connecticut Whale	AHL	67	11	9	20	104	—	—	—	—	—
2011–12	Ontario Reign	ECHL	65	29	31	60	179	5	1	1	2	15
2012–13	Ontario Reign	ECHL	52	24	30	54	218	10	2	7	9	13
2012–13	Houston Aeros	AHL	8	0	0	0	7	—	—	—	—	—
2013–14	Ontario Reign	ECHL	47	16	18	34	136	4	1	1	2	10
2014–15	Ontario Reign	ECHL	49	17	16	33	77	11	2	3	5	33
AHL totals			301	39	42	81	447	12	1	2	3	8
