= Bryan Bridges =

Canadian ice hockey player

- Born: December 27, 1985 (age 40) Victoria, British Columbia, Canada
- Height: 5 ft 11 in (180 cm)
- Weight: 170 lb (77 kg; 12 st 2 lb)
- Position: Goaltender
- Catches: Left
- SASHL team Former teams: St. Walburg Eagles; Victoria Salmon Kings; Colorado Eagles; Las Vegas Wranglers; Reading Royals; Elmira Jackals
- NHL draft: Undrafted
- Playing career: 2006–present

Bryan Bridges (born December 27, 1985) in Victoria, British Columbia) is a Canadian former professional ice hockey goaltender.

== Playing career ==
Bridges played major junior hockey in the Western Hockey League (WHL) for five seasons with the Kootenay Ice and Seattle Thunderbirds. While playing for the Ice 2001–02 he won the memorial cup. While playing with the Thunderbirds in 2004–05, he tied Kelly Guard for the WHL record for most shutouts in a season with 13. The next season, Bridges established the league record for most shutouts all-time with 21 (matched by Leland Irving in 2007–08, then surpassed by Tyson Sexsmith in 2008–09).

Undrafted by a National Hockey League (NHL) club, Bridges entered the professional ranks in the ECHL.

== Awards and honours ==
Award	Year
WHL
West Second All-Star Team	2005
