= Aaron Gagnon =

Canadian ice hockey player (born 1986)

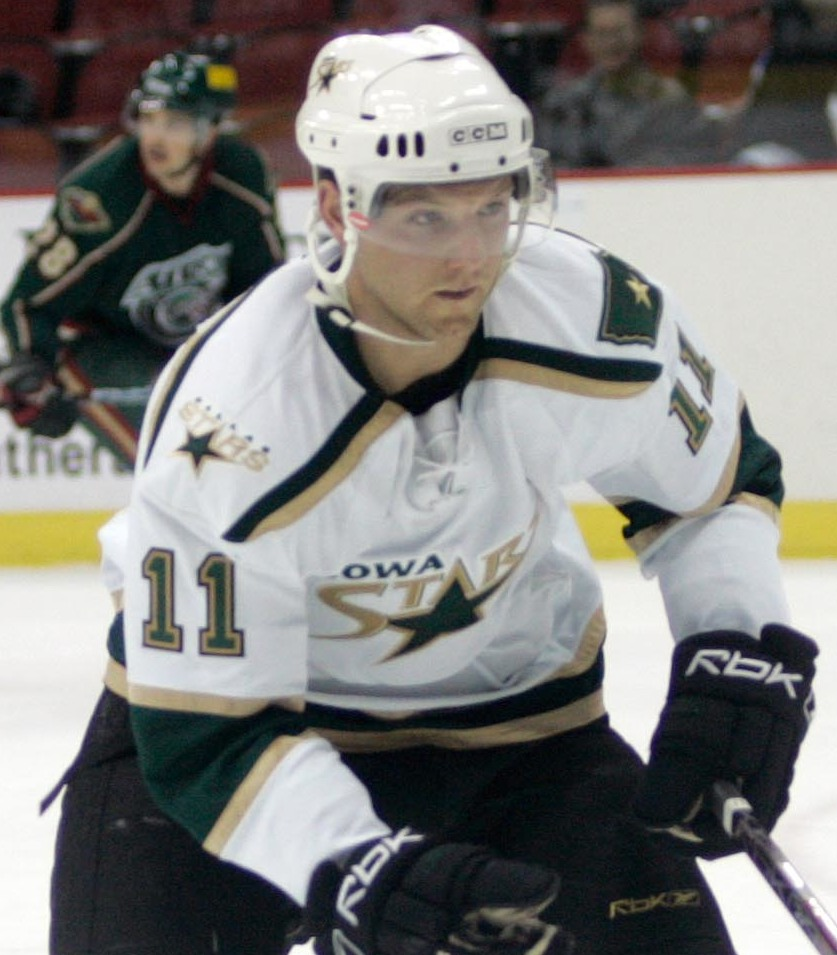
- Gagnon with the Iowa Stars in 2007
- Born: April 24, 1986 (age 40) Quesnel, British Columbia, Canada
- Height: 5 ft 11 in (180 cm)
- Weight: 189 lb (86 kg; 13 st 7 lb)
- Position: Centre
- Shot: Right
- Played for: Dallas Stars; Winnipeg Jets; HV71; Lukko; SC Bern; SCL Tigers
- NHL draft: 240th overall, 2004; Phoenix Coyotes
- Playing career: 2007–2020

Aaron Gagnon (born April 24, 1986) is a Canadian former professional ice hockey centre who played in the National Hockey League (NHL) with the Dallas Stars and Winnipeg Jets.

== Early life ==
Gagnon was born on April 24, 1986, in Quesnel, British Columbia, to parents Kelly and Barry Gagnon. He was raised in Armstrong, British Columbia. Gagnon has a sister, Jillian, and a brother, Bryn. His brother Bryn is also an ice hockey player, having played for the Salmon Arm Silverbacks of the British Columbia Hockey League and currently a member of the Southern Alberta Institute of Technology Trojans of the Alberta Colleges Athletics Conference.

== Playing career ==
=== Junior ===
Gagnon was drafted in the 5th round, 83rd overall by the Seattle Thunderbirds in the 2001 WHL Bantam Draft. In the season immediately following the draft, Gagnon played in 2 games with the Thunderbirds, while spending most of the season with his North Okanagan Midget AA team of the BCAHA where he scored 59 goals and 118 points in only 41 games to lead the team in scoring. One year later, Gagnon began his rookie season with Seattle. In 60 games, Gagnon scored 18 points while adding another 5 points in 15 playoff games. Gagnon's sophomore season was a large improvement over his rookie campaign. With 36 points in 63 games, Gagnon doubled his previous seasons' point total. Gagnon's defensive game also improved, as he led the Thunderbirds in plus/minus with a plus-18.

Gagnon's third season in the WHL proved to be one of his most successful. After setting new career highs in goals (31), assists (34), and points (65) in 72 games, Gagnon was named to the WHL West First All-Star Team and was named the Western Conference nomination for the Brad Hornung Trophy as the WHL's most sportsmanlike player of the year, an award he ultimately lost to Kris Russell of the Medicine Hat Tigers.

On September 22, 2005, just prior to the start of his fourth full WHL season, Gagnon was named captain of the Thunderbirds.

Gagnon's final season with the Thunderbirds was arguably the best of his WHL career. Serving once again as the Thunderbirds' captain, Gagnon finished the season with career highs in goals (42), assists (38), and points (80) in only 59 games. During the season, Gagnon was twice named the Boston Pizza WHL Player of the Week and was also named the Husky WHL Player of the Month for December. At the completion of the regular season, Gagnon was named to the WHL West First All-Star Team and was the Western Conference nomination for both the Four Broncos Memorial Trophy as the WHL's MVP, and the Brad Hornung Trophy as the WHL's most sportsmanlike player of the year. For the second time in his WHL career, Gagnon lost out on an award to Kris Russell of the Medicine Hat Tigers, losing the Four Broncos Memorial Trophy; however, Gagnon did manage to win his first Brad Hornung Trophy.

=== Professional ===
Gagnon was drafted in the eighth round, 240th overall by the Phoenix Coyotes in the 2004 NHL entry draft. On February 2, 2007, Gagnon signed a three-year entry-level contract with the Dallas Stars.

On July 1, 2011, Gagnon signed a one-year contract as a free agent with the Winnipeg Jets.

In early August 2013, after spending his first five professional seasons in North America, Gagnon signed for two years with the Swedish Hockey League team HV71, joining Riley Holzapfel whom he played with in St. John's IceCaps. In the 2013–14 season, Gagnon appeared in only 9 games with HV71 before opting to transfer to the Finnish Liiga with Lukko Rauma. He stayed at Lukko until January 25, 2017, and then moved to SC Bern of the National League (NL), where he inked a deal for the remainder of the 2016-17 season.

After three seasons with the SCL Tigers, he played his last professional season in 2020-21 with Swedish Allsvenskan club, Modo Hockey.

== International play ==
On April 1, 2004, Gagnon was named to the Canadian roster for the 2004 IIHF World U18 Championships in Minsk, Belarus.

== Career statistics ==
=== Regular season and playoffs ===
			Regular season					Playoffs
Season	Team	League	GP	G	A	Pts	PIM	GP	G	A	Pts	PIM
2001–02	Enderby Ice Kings	KIJHL	6	1	0	1	0	—	—	—	—	—
2001–02	Seattle Thunderbirds	WHL	2	0	0	0	0	—	—	—	—	—
2002–03	Seattle Thunderbirds	WHL	60	5	13	18	14	15	3	2	5	4
2003–04	Seattle Thunderbirds	WHL	63	21	15	36	29	—	—	—	—	—
2004–05	Seattle Thunderbirds	WHL	72	31	34	65	29	12	4	5	9	16
2005–06	Seattle Thunderbirds	WHL	62	24	21	45	40	7	5	3	8	6
2006–07	Seattle Thunderbirds	WHL	59	42	38	80	58	11	6	2	8	10
2007–08	Idaho Steelheads	ECHL	22	7	14	21	4	4	1	1	2	2
2007–08	Iowa Stars	AHL	25	0	1	1	8	—	—	—	—	—
2008–09	Grand Rapids Griffins	AHL	61	8	11	19	28	10	1	2	3	2
2009–10	Texas Stars	AHL	78	27	31	58	42	24	8	4	12	18
2009–10	Dallas Stars	NHL	2	0	0	0	0	—	—	—	—	—
2010–11	Texas Stars	AHL	58	14	23	37	24	6	2	2	4	4
2010–11	Dallas Stars	NHL	19	0	2	2	0	—	—	—	—	—
2011–12	St. John's IceCaps	AHL	63	14	20	34	14	15	5	4	9	6
2011–12	Winnipeg Jets	NHL	7	0	0	0	0	—	—	—	—	—
2012–13	St. John's IceCaps	AHL	43	11	13	24	18	—	—	—	—	—
2012–13	Winnipeg Jets	NHL	10	3	0	3	2	—	—	—	—	—
2013–14	HV71	SHL	9	2	1	3	4	—	—	—	—	—
2013–14	Lukko	Liiga	48	17	19	36	20	15	5	6	14	14
2014–15	Lukko	Liiga	47	14	16	30	28	14	3	7	10	6
2015–16	Lukko	Liiga	60	25	23	48	36	5	0	0	0	2
2016–17	Lukko	Liiga	43	11	15	26	24	—	—	—	—	—
2016–17	SC Bern	NLA	7	3	2	5	2	12	0	3	3	0
2017–18	SCL Tigers	NL	46	16	11	27	20	—	—	—	—	—
2018–19	SCL Tigers	NL	39	14	14	28	22	7	1	1	2	0
2019–20	SCL Tigers	NL	14	1	4	5	4	—	—	—	—	—
2020–21	Modo Hockey	Allsv	9	2	1	3	6	—	—	—	—	—
AHL totals			328	74	98	172	134	55	16	12	28	30
NHL totals			38	3	2	5	2	—	—	—	—	—
Liiga totals			198	67	73	140	108	34	8	16	24	22

=== International ===
Year	Team	Event	Result	GP	G	A	Pts	PIM
2004	Canada	WJC18	4th	7	0	3	3	10
Junior totals				7	0	3	3	10

== Awards and honours ==
Award	Year
WHL
West First All-Star Team	2005
West First All-Star Team	2007
Brad Hornung Trophy	2007

Awards
Preceded by Kris Russell	Winner of the WHL Brad Hornung Trophy; 2007	Succeeded by Tyler Ennis
