= Tyler Plante =

American-born Canadian ice hockey player (born 1987)

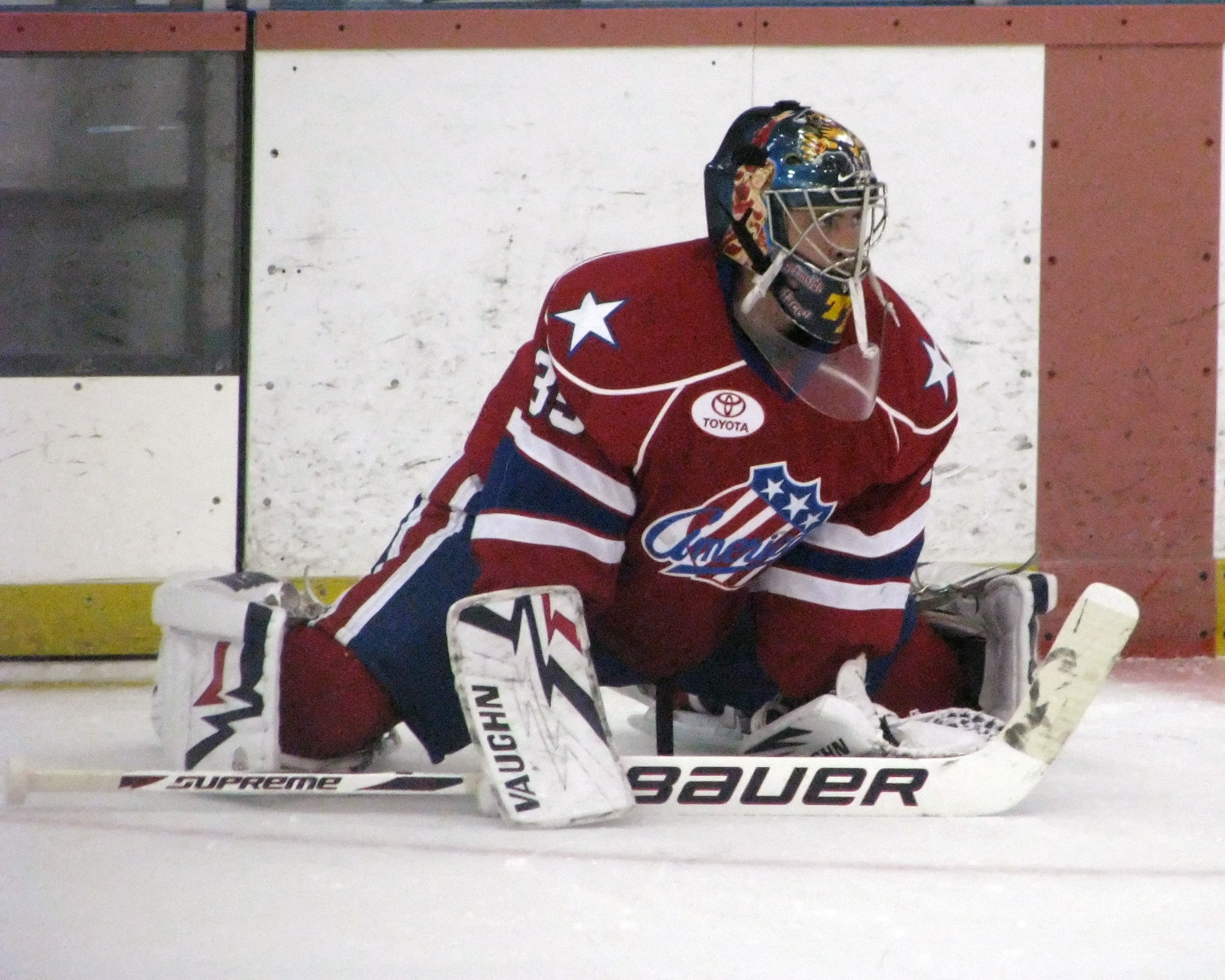
- Plante with the Rochester Americans in 2009
- Born: April 16, 1987 (age 39) Milwaukee, Wisconsin, U.S.
- Height: 6 ft 3 in (191 cm)
- Weight: 201 lb (91 kg; 14 st 5 lb)
- Position: Goaltender
- Shot: Left
- Played for: Rochester Americans; San Antonio Rampage; Mora IK; HC Asiago; Lørenskog IK
- NHL draft: 32nd overall, 2005; Florida Panthers
- Playing career: 2007–2016

Tyler Plante (born April 16, 1987) is an American-born Canadian former professional ice hockey goaltender who last played with the Lørenskog IK of the GET-ligaen. He is currently the goaltending coach for the Brandon Wheat Kings of the WHL

== Playing career ==
Tyler was drafted by the Florida Panthers in the second round, 32nd overall, in the 2005 NHL entry draft. Tyler gained NHL attention playing for the Brandon Wheat Kings of the Western Hockey League and earning the Jim Piggott Memorial Trophy as the top rookie of the WHL in the 2004–05 season. After three full seasons with the Wheat Kings, Plante was signed by the Panthers to a three-year entry-level contract on June 1, 2007. Since then, he has spent most of his playing time with the Florida Panthers AHL affiliates, the Rochester Americans until 2011, then the San Antonio Rampage.

He was recalled up to Florida for a pre-season game at the start of the 2008–09 NHL season, but didn't get any playing time and started the season in Rochester. After a lackluster start with the Americans, he was demoted to the ECHL and spent time with the Dayton Bombers. After spending over two months with the Bombers, he was called up to Rochester.

On September 30, 2011, the Florida Panthers assigned Plante to play in the AHL with the San Antonio Rampage. With the Panthers stockpile of goaltending prospects, Plante was demoted to the ECHL with the Cincinnati Cyclones before he opted to pursue a playing career abroad with the ambition to further his career. He signed a contract with Swedish second division club, Mora IK of the HockeyAllsvenskan. Plante played 6 games with Mora before signing with top-tier club Djurgårdens IF. He dressed as backup for 11 games with Djurgårdens IF without seeing any ice time.

In the 2012–13 season, Plante was instrumental in helping HC Asiago win the Serie A Championship.

After retiring from hockey, Plante joined his former WHL team, the Brandon Wheat Kings, as a goaltending coach in 2016.

== Personal life ==
Plante was born in Milwaukee, Wisconsin and raised in Brandon, Manitoba. Plante was born while his father, Cam, was a member of the Milwaukee Admirals. His brother, Alex, was a first round draft pick of the Edmonton Oilers.

Plante was married in the summer of 2013. Plante and his wife, Jordana, have two children, a son and a daughter.

He now sells real estate in Brandon, Manitoba with his father, Cam.

== Career statistics ==
			Regular season									Playoffs
Season	Team	League	GP	W	L	T/OT	MIN	GA	SO	GAA	SV%	GP	W	L	MIN	GA	SO	GAA	SV%
2003–04	Brandon Wheat Kings	WHL	2	0	0	1	58	2	0	2.07	.889	—	—	—	—	—	—	—	—
2004–05	Brandon Wheat Kings	WHL	48	34	11	2	2833	122	6	2.58	.907	24	13	11	1408	69	0	2.94	.911
2005–06	Brandon Wheat Kings	WHL	60	25	24	5	3414	189	2	3.32	.898	6	2	4	360	18	0	3.00	.914
2006–07	Brandon Wheat Kings	WHL	54	30	14	2	3215	145	4	2.71	.911	11	6	5	659	37	0	3.37	.889
2007–08	Rochester Americans	AHL	25	6	16	1	1451	86	0	3.56	.885	—	—	—	—	—	—	—	—
2007–08	Florida Everblades	ECHL	10	4	5	1	598	28	1	2.81	.921	—	—	—	—	—	—	—	—
2008–09	Rochester Americans	AHL	19	5	10	1	904	49	0	3.25	.902	—	—	—	—	—	—	—	—
2008–09	Dayton Bombers	ECHL	19	6	11	1	1076	60	0	3.35	.888	—	—	—	—	—	—	—	—
2009–10	Rochester Americans	AHL	27	12	12	1	1487	66	3	2.66	.914	7	3	3	346	14	0	2.43	.935
2010–11	Rochester Americans	AHL	35	13	17	2	1942	101	1	3.12	.909	—	—	—	—	—	—	—	—
2011–12	San Antonio Rampage	AHL	2	0	2	0	96	5	0	3.14	.889	—	—	—	—	—	—	—	—
2011–12	Cincinnati Cyclones	ECHL	4	1	1	2	249	11	0	2.65	.896	—	—	—	—	—	—	—	—
2011–12	Mora IK	Allsv	6	—	—	—	360	18	0	3.00	.899	—	—	—	—	—	—	—	—
2012–13	Colorado Eagles	ECHL	5	1	3	0	264	18	0	4.09	.879	—	—	—	—	—	—	—	—
2012–13	HC Asiago	ITA	9	6	3	0	524	20	2	2.29	.911	15	—	—	—	—	—	2.53	.919
2013–14	Lørenskog IK	GET	17	—	—	—	—	—	—	2.28	.917	—	—	—	—	—	—	—	—
2014–15	Lørenskog IK	GET	27	—	—	—	—	—	—	2.36	.918	6	—	—	—	—	—	3.04	.897
AHL totals			108	36	57	4	5425	272	4	3.03	.902	7	3	3	346	14	0	2.43	.935

Awards and achievements
Preceded by Gilbert Brule	Winner of the Jim Piggott Memorial Trophy; 2004–05	Succeeded by Peter Mueller
