= Jeff Glass =

Canadian ice hockey player

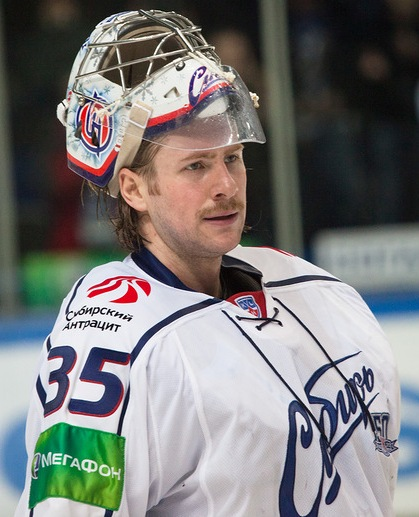
- Glass with Barys Astana in 2012
- Born: November 19, 1985 (age 40) Calgary, Alberta, Canada
- Height: 6 ft 3 in (191 cm)
- Weight: 206 lb (93 kg; 14 st 10 lb)
- Position: Goaltender
- Caught: Left
- Played for: Barys Astana; Sibir Novosibirsk; Spartak Moscow; CSKA Moscow; Lada Togliatti; Dinamo Minsk; Chicago Blackhawks; EHC Black Wings Linz
- NHL draft: 89th overall, 2004; Ottawa Senators
- Playing career: 2005–2021

Medal record

Ice hockey

Representing Canada

Spengler Cup
Gold medal – first place	2015 Davos	

World Junior Championships
Gold medal – first place	2005 Canada	

Jeff Glass (born November 19, 1985) is a Canadian former professional ice hockey goaltender who last played for the San Diego Gulls of the American Hockey League (AHL). Glass was selected by the Ottawa Senators in the 3rd round (89th overall) of the 2004 NHL entry draft. He joined their minor league affiliate and played several years with the organization before leaving as a free agent to join Barys Astana in 2009. He made his long-awaited NHL debut in the 2017–18 season with the Chicago Blackhawks.

== Playing career ==
Glass spent his junior career with the Kootenay Ice of the Western Hockey League (WHL), spending three seasons with the team from 2002–2005. At the conclusion of the 2004–05 season, Glass won the Del Wilson Trophy as the WHL's top goaltender, was named to the WHL First All-Star team, and was named CHL Goaltender of the Year as the best goaltender in Canadian major-junior hockey. That year, Glass was also named starting goaltender for Canada at the 2005 World Junior Championships in North Dakota. Glass went 5–0 with a 1.40 goals against average (GAA), backstopping Canada to its first gold medal at the tournament since 1997.

Glass was drafted by the Ottawa Senators in the third round, 89th overall, of the 2004 NHL entry draft. After his stellar 2004–05 campaign, he signed a three-year entry-level contract with the Senators. He spent the majority of the 2005–06 season with the Senators' ECHL affiliate, the Charlotte Checkers, before securing a full-time job with the Senators' top minor-league affiliate, the American Hockey League's Binghamton Senators, in 2006–07. For the next three seasons Glass shared time in Binghamton with Kelly Guard and Brian Elliott, compiling a record of 42–67–9.

After the 2008–09 season, Glass became a free agent and on August 30, 2009, he signed an undisclosed deal with the KHL's Barys Astana. Glass had a stellar 2009–10 campaign with Astana, posting a 19–11–4 record with a 2.87 GAA and .918 save percentage. Astana lost its first round playoff series to the eventual Gagarin Cup champions, Ak Bars Kazan.

Glass signed with Spartak Moscow before the 2013–14 season, however due to team financial problems he was sold to CSKA Moscow in January 2014. On July 9, 2014, Glass signed as a free agent to a one-year contract with Lada Togliatti.

He signed with another KHL team for the 2015–16 campaign, joining Dinamo Minsk. In December 2015, he represented Team Canada at the Spengler Cup and helped capture the title.

On August 26, 2016, Glass having returned to North America after 7 seasons in the KHL, signed with the Toronto Maple Leafs on a professional try-out contract to attend training camp. On September 27, 2016, he was reassigned by the Maple Leafs to attend affiliate, the Toronto Marlies training camp in the AHL. He ended up being released from the Marlies and on January 10, 2017 signed a contract to play for the Rockford IceHogs, affiliate to the Chicago Blackhawks. Glass appeared in 10 games with the IceHogs, before he was signed to a two-year, two-way NHL contract with the Blackhawks on February 23, 2017. On March 3, 2017, Glass was recalled by the Blackhawks to back up Corey Crawford against the New York Islanders.

On December 29, 2017, Glass made his NHL debut in a 4–3 win over the Edmonton Oilers.

On September 3, 2018, Glass agreed to attend hometown club, the Calgary Flames' training camp on a professional tryout. After attending camp he was released from his tryout during pre-season. He secured a contract for the 2018–19 season, on October 4, 2018, signing to one-year AHL contract with the Toronto Marlies. Glass appeared in 10 games with the Marlies for 3 wins before he was traded to the San Diego Gulls as a part of an NHL transaction between the Toronto Maple Leafs and Anaheim Ducks on December 10, 2018.

Following a European season abroad in the Austrian Hockey League with the EHC Black Wings Linz, Glass returned to North America approaching the delayed 2020–21 season, securing a one-year contract in a return with the San Diego Gulls on January 11, 2021.

== Career statistics ==
=== Regular season and playoffs ===
			Regular season									Playoffs
Season	Team	League	GP	W	L	T/OT	MIN	GA	SO	GAA	SV%	GP	W	L	MIN	GA	SO	GAA	SV%
2002–03	Kootenay Ice	WHL	35	15	16	3	1884	77	4	2.45	.909	9	4	5	643	23	0	2.15	.921
2003–04	Kootenay Ice	WHL	57	26	20	6	3263	128	5	2.35	.911	4	0	4	239	14	0	3.51	.878
2004–05	Kootenay Ice	WHL	51	34	11	5	3061	90	8	1.76	.932	16	10	6	1027	39	0	2.28	.916
2005–06	Charlotte Checkers	ECHL	39	19	15	4	2221	119	2	3.22	.907	—	—	—	—	—	—	—	—
2005–06	Binghamton Senators	AHL	6	1	4	0	312	20	0	3.85	.883	3	1	2	178	11	0	3.71	.875
2006–07	Binghamton Senators	AHL	43	9	24	2	2174	149	1	4.11	.888	—	—	—	—	—	—	—	—
2007–08	Binghamton Senators	AHL	45	15	20	4	2313	111	2	2.88	.913	—	—	—	—	—	—	—	—
2008–09	Binghamton Senators	AHL	41	17	19	3	2219	119	0	3.22	.903	—	—	—	—	—	—	—	—
2009–10	Barys Astana	KHL	41	19	11	4	2113	101	1	2.87	.918	3	0	3	223	10	0	2.69	.929
2010–11	Barys Astana	KHL	23	7	9	4	1240	61	1	2.95	.911	2	0	2	119	6	0	3.02	.910
2011–12	Barys Astana	KHL	28	12	12	2	1546	83	1	3.22	.904	—	—	—	—	—	—	—	—
2012–13	Sibir Novosibirsk	KHL	38	16	11	8	2198	74	4	2.02	.933	7	3	4	407	12	2	1.77	.941
2013–14	Spartak Moscow	KHL	35	12	19	6	2098	81	4	2.32	.919	—	—	—	—	—	—	—	—
2013–14	CSKA Moscow	KHL	6	2	2	2	366	8	1	1.31	.944	4	0	4	212	11	0	3.11	.904
2014–15	Lada Togliatti	KHL	14	1	9	0	676	39	0	3.46	.885	—	—	—	—	—	—	—	—
2015–16	Dinamo Minsk	KHL	31	12	14	4	1756	81	4	2.77	.910	—	—	—	—	—	—	—	—
2016–17	Toronto Marlies	AHL	2	1	1	0	117	4	0	2.05	.917	—	—	—	—	—	—	—	—
2016–17	Rockford IceHogs	AHL	20	8	10	2	1165	51	2	2.63	.914	—	—	—	—	—	—	—	—
2017–18	Rockford IceHogs	AHL	28	15	9	3	1639	77	0	2.82	.904	3	2	1	202	5	0	1.48	.955
2017–18	Chicago Blackhawks	NHL	15	3	7	3	821	46	0	3.36	.898	—	—	—	—	—	—	—	—
2018–19	Toronto Marlies	AHL	10	3	4	1	460	33	0	4.31	.849	—	—	—	—	—	—	—	—
2018–19	San Diego Gulls	AHL	19	9	5	2	1024	53	1	3.10	.897	11	6	4	715	29	0	2.43	.912
2019–20	EHC Black Wings Linz	EBEL	9	4	5	0	540	22	1	2.44	.920	3	3	0	—	—	0	2.41	.920
2020–21	San Diego Gulls	AHL	4	0	2	0	170	13	0	4.60	.871	—	—	—	—	—	—	—	—
KHL totals			173	68	64	26	9562	432	12	2.60	.917	16	3	13	961	39	2	2.43	.926
NHL totals			15	3	7	3	821	46	0	3.36	.898	—	—	—	—	—	—	—	—

== Awards and honours ==
Award	Year
WHL
West First All-Star Team	2005
