= 2004–05 WHL season =

Junior ice hockey season

- League: Western Hockey League
- Sport: Ice hockey
- Duration: September, 2004 – May, 2005
- Teams: 20

Regular season
- Scotty Munro Memorial Trophy: Kootenay Ice (1)
- Season MVP: Eric Fehr (Brandon Wheat Kings)
- Top scorer: Eric Fehr (Brandon Wheat Kings)

Playoffs
- Playoffs MVP: Shea Weber (Rockets)
- Finals champions: Kelowna Rockets (2)
- Runners-up: Brandon Wheat Kings

WHL seasons
- 2003–04 2005–06

2004–05 CHL season
- League: Canadian Hockey League
- Sport: Ice hockey
- Duration: September 2004 – May 2005
- Teams: 56

OHL

QMJHL

WHL

Memorial Cup
- Finals champions: London Knights (OHL) (1st title)
- Runners-up: Rimouski Océanic (QMJHL)

The 2004–05 WHL season was the 39th season of the Western Hockey League (WHL). Twenty teams completed a 72-game schedule. The Kootenay Ice won their first Scotty Munro Memorial Trophy for posting the league's best regular season record. The Kelowna Rockets defeated the Brandon Wheat Kings in the championship series of the playoffs to win their second President's Cup in three seasons and advance to the 2005 Memorial Cup tournament.

== Regular season ==
Map of WHL, 2003–04 to 2005–06
East Division
Central Division
BC Division
US Division

=== Final standings ===
==== Eastern Conference ====
East Division
Pos	Team	Pld	W	L	T	OTL	GF	GA	Pts
1	x – Brandon Wheat Kings	72	45	21	5	1	255	199	96
2	x – Saskatoon Blades	72	37	23	6	6	234	215	86
3	x – Prince Albert Raiders	72	31	32	5	4	185	191	71
4	x – Moose Jaw Warriors	72	14	47	10	1	182	282	39
5	Regina Pats	72	12	50	4	6	154	285	34

x – qualified for playoffs

Central Division
Pos	Team	Pld	W	L	T	OTL	GF	GA	Pts
1	x – Medicine Hat Tigers	72	45	21	4	2	234	143	96
2	x – Lethbridge Hurricanes	72	39	20	12	1	222	162	91
3	x – Calgary Hitmen	72	34	23	9	6	200	183	83
4	x – Red Deer Rebels	72	36	26	6	4	206	200	82
5	Swift Current Broncos	72	22	41	6	3	135	218	53

x – qualified for playoffs

==== Western Conference ====
B.C. Division
Pos	Team	Pld	W	L	T	OTL	GF	GA	Pts
1	x – Kootenay Ice	72	47	15	7	3	218	137	104
2	x – Kelowna Rockets	72	45	13	12	2	215	139	104
3	x – Vancouver Giants	72	34	30	4	4	212	205	76
4	x – Kamloops Blazers	72	26	37	7	2	161	211	61
5	Prince George Cougars	72	26	41	3	2	158	223	57

x – qualified for playoffs

U.S. Division
Pos	Team	Pld	W	L	T	OTL	GF	GA	Pts
1	x – Seattle Thunderbirds	72	43	24	2	3	204	144	91
2	x – Portland Winter Hawks	72	35	27	5	5	204	198	80
3	x – Everett Silvertips	72	33	28	9	2	167	149	77
4	x – Tri-City Americans	72	26	34	8	4	172	196	64
5	Spokane Chiefs	72	24	38	8	2	192	230	58

x – qualified for playoffs

=== Scoring leaders ===
Note: GP = Games played; G = Goals; A = Assists; Pts = Points; PIM = Penalties in minutes

Player	Team	GP	G	A	Pts	PIM
Eric Fehr	Brandon Wheat Kings	71	59	52	111	91
Ryan Stone	Brandon Wheat Kings	70	33	66	99	127
Gilbert Brulé	Vancouver Giants	70	39	48	87	169
Tim Konsorada	Brandon Wheat Kings	71	29	58	87	43
Colton Yellow Horn	Lethbridge Hurricanes	70	35	51	86	40
Jonathan Filewich	Lethbridge Hurricanes	68	42	38	80	26
Adam Courchaine	Vancouver Giants	71	28	50	78	32
Stefan Meyer	Medicine Hat Tigers	69	34	43	77	104
Nigel Dawes	Kootenay Ice	63	50	26	76	30
Kenndal McArdle	Moose Jaw Warriors	70	37	37	74	122

=== Leading goaltenders ===
Note: GP = Games played; Min = Minutes played; W = Wins; L = Losses; T = Ties; GA = Goals against; SO = Total shutouts; SV% = Save percentage; GAA = Goals against average

Player	Team	GP	Min	W	L	T	GA	SO	SV%	GAA
Matt Keetley	Medicine Hat Tigers	32	1845	21	5	3	51	6	.933	1.66
Jeff Glass	Kootenay Ice	51	3060	34	11	5	91	8	.931	1.78
Bryan Bridges	Seattle Thunderbirds	58	3381	36	20	2	103	13	.926	1.83
Derek Yeomans	Kelowna Rockets	54	3277	33	13	8	100	6	.923	1.83
Michael Wall	Everett Silvertips	56	3190	24	22	8	102	10	.931	1.92

== 2005 WHL playoffs ==
Conference Quarter-finals	Conference Semi-finals
E1	Brandon	4
E4	Moose Jaw	1
C1	Medicine Hat	2
E3	Prince Albert	4
E2	Saskatoon	0
E3	Prince Albert	4
Eastern
C1	Medicine Hat	4
C4	Red Deer	3
E1	Brandon	4
C3	Calgary	3
C2	Lethbridge	1
C3	Calgary	4
B1	Kootenay	4
B4	Kamloops	2
B1	Kootenay	4
U3	Everett	0
B2	Kelowna	4
B3	Vancouver	2
Western
U1	Seattle	4
U4	Tri-City	1
U1	Seattle	3
B2	Kelowna	4
U2	Portland	3
U3	Everett	4

Conference Finals
E1	Brandon	4
E3	Prince Albert	3
B1	Kootenay	2
B2	Kelowna	4

WHL Championship
E1	Brandon	1
B2	Kelowna	4

=== Conference quarterfinals ===
==== (E1) Brandon Wheat Kings vs. (E4) Moose Jaw Warriors ====
March 25	Brandon Wheat Kings	7 – 3	Moose Jaw Warriors	Keystone Arena
8:50 - pp - Jeff Topilko (1); 17:22 - Jeff Topilko (2)		First period	Stuart Kerr (1) - pp - 4:47
6:54 - pp - Lance Monych (1); 13:05 - Eric Fehr (1)		Second period	Riley Holzapfel (1) - pp - 15:08; Jordan Henry (1) - 15:52
0:53 - Jeff Topilko (3); 13:28 - pp - Lance Monych (2); 13:49 - Jonathan Webb (1)		Third period	No scoring
Tyler Plante (20 saves / 23 shots)		Goalie stats	Josh Lepp (32 saves / 39 shots)

March 27	Brandon Wheat Kings	5 – 1	Moose Jaw Warriors	Keystone Arena
15:10 - pp - Eric Fehr (2); 17:21 - pp - Derek LeBlanc (1)		First period	No scoring
0:59 - Jakub Šindel (1)		Second period	No scoring
1:41 - Ryan Reaves (1); 8:34 - pp - Eric Fehr (3)		Third period	Blair Jones (1) - pp - 15:18
Tyler Plante (20 saves / 21 shots)		Goalie stats	Josh Lepp (35 saves / 40 shots)

March 30	Moose Jaw Warriors	4 – 1	Brandon Wheat Kings	Civic Centre
9:20 - pp - Dan Ehrman (1)		First period	Ryan Reaves (2) - 7:46
No scoring		Second period	No scoring
3:54 - Dustin Boyd (1); 4:59 - Masi Marjamäki (1); 8:42 - pp - Steven Gillen (1)		Third period	No scoring
Josh Lepp (27 saves / 28 shots)		Goalie stats	Tyler Plante (43 saves / 47 shots)

April 1	Moose Jaw Warriors	3 – 4	Brandon Wheat Kings	Civic Centre
16:54 - pp - Troy Brouwer (1)		First period	Codey Burki (1) - 13:37
17:49 - pp - Blair Jones (2)		Second period	Lance Monych (3) - sh - 10:46; Sami Sandell (1) - pp - 12:55; Jeff Topilko (4) - 13:36
12:02 - pp - Kenndal McArdle (1)		Third period	No scoring
Josh Lepp (21 saves / 25 shots); Joey Perricone (9 saves / 9 shots)		Goalie stats	Tyler Plante (40 saves / 43 shots)

April 2	Moose Jaw Warriors	1 – 9	Brandon Wheat Kings	Civic Centre
No scoring		First period	0:25 - Steven Later (1); 2:23 - pp - Steven Later (2); 5:07 - Lance Monych (4); 17:21 - Ryan Stone (1)
Jordan Henry (2) - 5:22		Second period	3:36 - Eric Fehr (4); 7:19 - Eric Fehr (5); 17:37 - Eric Fehr (6); 18:30 - Sami Sandell (2)
No scoring		Third period	4:55 - Daryl Boyle (1)
Josh Lepp (10 saves / 14 shots); Joey Perricone (20 saves / 25 shots)		Goalie stats	Tyler Plante (24 saves / 25 shots)

Brandon wins series 4 – 1

* Note: Game 2 was played at MTS Centre in Winnipeg.

==== (E2) Saskatoon Blades vs. (E3) Prince Albert Raiders ====
March 23	Saskatoon Blades	1 – 2	Prince Albert Raiders	Credit Union Centre
No scoring		First period	No scoring
17:19 - pp - Wacey Rabbit (1)		Second period	Jeremy Colliton (1) - 18:15
No scoring		Third period	Ryan DePape (1) - 2:04
Ryan Cyr (28 saves / 30 shots)		Goalie stats	Réjean Beauchemin (15 saves / 16 shots)

March 26	Prince Albert Raiders	3 – 0	Saskatoon Blades	Art Hauser Centre

March 28	Saskatoon Blades	2 – 3	Prince Albert Raiders	Credit Union Centre

March 30	Prince Albert Raiders	3 – 2	OT	Saskatoon Blades	Art Hauser Centre

Prince Albert wins series 4 – 0

==== (C1) Medicine Hat Tigers vs. (C4) Red Deer Rebels ====
March 26	Medicine Hat Tigers	3 – 2	Red Deer Rebels	Medicine Hat Arena
2:26 - Gord Baldwin (1); 15:39 - Darren Helm (1); 16:29 - Brett Robertson (1)		First period	Ty Morris (1) - pp - 16:51; Roman Wick (1) - pp - 18:21
No scoring		Second period	No scoring
No scoring		Third period	No scoring
Matt Keetley (23 saves / 25 shots)		Goalie stats	Andrew Leslie (24 saves / 27 shots)

March 27	Medicine Hat Tigers	3 – 4	Red Deer Rebels	Medicine Hat Arena

March 29	Red Deer Rebels	3 – 2	OT	Medicine Hat Tigers	Peavey Mart Centrium

March 30	Red Deer Rebels	1 – 6	Medicine Hat Tigers	Peavey Mart Centrium

April 1	Medicine Hat Tigers	5 – 4	Red Deer Rebels	Medicine Hat Arena

April 3	Red Deer Rebels	3 – 0	Medicine Hat Tigers	Peavey Mart Centrium

April 5	Medicine Hat Tigers	5 – 4	Red Deer Rebels	Medicine Hat Arena

Medicine Hat wins series 4 – 3

==== (U2) Lethbridge Hurricanes vs. (U3) Calgary Hitmen ====
March 25	Lethbridge Hurricanes	2 – 1	Calgary Hitmen	Enmax Centre
No scoring		First period	No scoring
No scoring		Second period	Tyrel Lucas (1) - pp - 14:49
1:36 - Mark Olafson (1); 15:36 - Colton Yellow Horn (1)		Third period	No scoring
Aaron Sorochan (24 saves / 25 shots)		Goalie stats	Justin Pogge (25 saves / 27 shots)

March 26	Lethbridge Hurricanes	2 – 3	Calgary Hitmen	Enmax Centre
2:45 - pp - Brent Seabrook (1)		First period	Ryan Getzlaf (1) - 9:39
No scoring		Second period	Shaun Landolt (1) - pp - 2:52; Andrew Ladd (1) - sh - 4:50
17:47 - Jonathan Filewich (1)		Third period	No scoring
Aaron Sorochan (24 saves / 27 shots)		Goalie stats	Justin Pogge (32 saves / 34 shots)

March 29	Calgary Hitmen	4 – 0	Lethbridge Hurricanes	Scotiabank Saddledome

March 30	Calgary Hitmen	3 – 2	2OT	Lethbridge Hurricanes	Scotiabank Saddledome

April 1	Lethbridge Hurricanes	1 – 2	OT	Calgary Hitmen	Enmax Centre

Calgary wins series 4 – 1

==== (B1) Kootenay Ice vs. (B4) Kamloops Blazers ====
March 25	Kootenay Ice	3 – 4	OT	Kamloops Blazers	Cranbrook Recreational Complex
13:09 - Martin Šagát (1)		First period		No scoring
7:10 - sh - Dale Mahovsky (1)		Second period		No scoring
4:11 - Martin Šagát (2)		Third period		Aaron Richards (1) - sh - 6:05; Roman Teslyuk (1) - pp - 8:00; Brock Nixon (1) - 8:32
No scoring		First overtime period		Terrance Delaronde (1) - 0:16
Jeff Glass (23 saves / 27 shots)		Goalie stats		Devan Dubnyk (35 saves / 38 shots)

March 26	Kootenay Ice	3 – 2	OT	Kamloops Blazers	Cranbrook Recreational Complex
17:24 - Adam Taylor (1)		First period		Roman Teslyuk (2) - pp - 3:00
No scoring		Second period		Kevin Hayman (1) - 10:45
11:53 - James Cherewyk (1)		Third period		No scoring
0:35 - Nigel Dawes (1)		First overtime period		No scoring
Jeff Glass (26 saves / 28 shots)		Goalie stats		Devan Dubnyk (39 saves / 42 shots)

March 29	Kamloops Blazers	3 – 2	Kootenay Ice	Interior Savings Centre
14:16 - pp - Roman Teslyuk (3); 17:03 - pp - Aaron Richards (2)		First period	Michael Busto (1) - pp - 12:57
No scoring		Second period	Nigel Dawes (2) - pp - 11:08
18:57 - Kevin Hayman (2)		Third period	No scoring
Devan Dubnyk (26 saves / 28 shots)		Goalie stats	Jeff Glass (28 saves / 31 shots)

March 30	Kamloops Blazers	2 – 3	OT	Kootenay Ice	Interior Savings Centre
No scoring		First period		Adam Cracknell (1) - 15:57
No scoring		Second period		No scoring
11:43 - Nathan Grochmal (1); 12:55 - Roman Teslyuk (4)		Third period		Ryan Russell (1) - 19:13
No scoring		First overtime period		Dale Mahovsky (2) - 1:25
Devan Dubnyk (23 saves / 26 shots)		Goalie stats		Jeff Glass (26 saves / 28 shots)

April 1	Kootenay Ice	5 – 2	Kamloops Blazers	Cranbrook Recreational Complex
3:29 - Steve DaSilva (1); 11:09 - Brett Sutter (1); 18:47 - Martin Šagát (3)		First period	No scoring
No scoring		Second period	Nathan Grochmal (2) - 8:04
6:50 - pp - Dale Mahovsky (3); 19:14 - en - Adam Taylor (2)		Third period	Brock Nixon (2) - pp - 11:23
Jeff Glass (18 saves / 20 shots)		Goalie stats	Devan Dubnyk (25 saves / 29 shots)

April 3	Kamloops Blazers	1 – 7	Kootenay Ice	Interior Savings Centre
No scoring		First period	Dale Mahovsky (4) - pp - 12:26; Steve DaSilva (2) - 14:54
No scoring		Second period	Chad Greenan (1) - pp - 4:00; Ryan Russell (2) - 15:05
19:29 - pp - Matt Kassian (1)		Third period	Dale Mahovsky (5) - pp - 0:08; Dale Mahovsky (6) - 5:02; Andy Bossence (1) - 13:13
Devan Dubnyk (23 saves / 30 shots)		Goalie stats	Jeff Glass (22 saves / 23 shots)

Kootenay wins series 4 – 2

==== (B2) Kelowna Rockets vs. (B3) Vancouver Giants ====
March 25	Kelowna Rockets	3 – 4	Vancouver Giants	Prospera Place
No scoring		First period	No scoring
16:28 - Brent Howarth (1)		Second period	Triston Grant (1) - 3:58; Gilbert Brulé (1) - pp - 12:37; Adam Courchaine (1) - 17:01
4:05 - Tyler Mosienko (1); 8:36 - Brent Howarth (2)		Third period	Conlan Seder (1) - 12:18
Derek Yeomans (20 saves / 24 shots)		Goalie stats	Marek Schwarz (27 saves / 30 shots)

March 26	Kelowna Rockets	4 – 3	OT	Vancouver Giants	Prospera Place

March 29	Vancouver Giants	4 – 3	Kelowna Rockets	Pacific Coliseum

March 30	Vancouver Giants	1 – 2	OT	Kelowna Rockets	Pacific Coliseum

April 1	Kelowna Rockets	3 – 2	Vancouver Giants	Prospera Place

April 2	Vancouver Giants	2 – 3	Kelowna Rockets	Pacific Coliseum

Kelowna wins series 4 – 2

==== (U1) Seattle Thunderbirds vs. (U4) Tri-City Americans ====
March 26	Seattle Thunderbirds	3 – 2	2OT	Tri-City Americans	Key Arena
13:19 - Nate Thompson (1)		First period		Ian McDonald (1) - 5:45; Luke Hewitt (1) - 16:41
No scoring		Second period		No scoring
11:57 - Clayton Barthel (1)		Third period		No scoring
6:12 - Derek Couture (1)		Second overtime period		No scoring
Bryan Bridges (47 saves / 49 shots)		Goalie stats		Carey Price (67 saves / 70 shots)

March 28	Seattle Thunderbirds	2 – 1	Tri-City Americans	Key Arena
No scoring		First period	No scoring
4:31 - pp - Mitch Fadden (1)		Second period	No scoring
12:38 - Aaron Gagnon (1)		Third period	Andy Thompson (1) - pp - 10:37
Bryan Bridges (32 saves / 33 shots)		Goalie stats	Carey Price (39 saves / 41 shots)

March 30	Tri-City Americans	2 – 3	Seattle Thunderbirds	Toyota Center
19:59 - Jason Beeman (1)		First period	Ladislav Ščurko (1) - pp - 17:29
No scoring		Second period	Aaron Gagnon (2) - 15:33
18:38 - Jason Beeman (2)		Third period	Aaron Gagnon (3) - 16:02
Carey Price (20 saves / 23 shots)		Goalie stats	Bryan Bridges (29 saves / 31 shots)

April 1	Tri-City Americans	3 – 2	OT	Seattle Thunderbirds	Toyota Center
10:58 - pp - Shawn Belle (1); 19:54 - Marcus Jonasen (1)		First period		Mitch Fadden (2) - 11:45
No scoring		Second period		No scoring
No scoring		Third period		Derek Couture (2) - 7:37
3:16 - Marc Connors (1)		First overtime period		No scoring
Carey Price (24 saves / 26 shots)		Goalie stats		Bryan Bridges (24 saves / 27 shots)

April 3	Seattle Thunderbirds	2 – 1	Tri-City Americans	Key Arena
No scoring		First period	No scoring
No scoring		Second period	Ian McDonald (2) - 11:03
8:01 - Ladislav Ščurko (2); 12:53 - Denis Tolpeko (1)		Third period	No scoring
Bryan Bridges (30 saves / 31 shots)		Goalie stats	Carey Price (25 saves / 27 shots)

Seattle wins series 4 – 1

==== (U2) Portland Winterhawks vs. (U3) Everett Silvertips ====
March 25	Portland Winterhawks	3 – 0	Everett Silvertips	Moda Center
No scoring		First period	No scoring
18:17 - pp - Brandon Dubinsky (1)		Second period	No scoring
10:27 - sh - Brian Woolger (1); 14:37 - en - Brandon Dubinsky (2)		Third period	No scoring
Blake Grenier (20 saves / 20 shots)		Goalie stats	Michael Wall (31 saves / 33 shots)

March 27	Portland Winterhawks	1 – 2	Everett Silvertips	Moda Center

March 29	Everett Silvertips	3 – 0	Portland Winterhawks	Everett Event Center

March 30	Everett Silvertips	3 – 2	OT	Portland Winterhawks	Everett Event Center

April 1	Portland Winterhawks	3 – 2	Everett Silvertips	Moda Center

April 2	Everett Silvertips	2 – 3	OT	Portland Winterhawks	Everett Event Center

April 5	Portland Winterhawks	2 – 3	Everett Silvertips	Moda Center

Everett wins series 4 – 3

=== Conference semifinals ===
==== (C1) Medicine Hat Tigers vs. (E3) Prince Albert Raiders ====
April 9	Medicine Hat Tigers	3 – 1	Prince Albert Raiders	Medicine Hat Arena

April 10	Medicine Hat Tigers	2 – 1	Prince Albert Raiders	Medicine Hat Arena

April 12	Prince Albert Raiders	7 – 2	Medicine Hat Tigers	Art Hauser Centre

April 13	Prince Albert Raiders	2 – 1	Medicine Hat Tigers	Art Hauser Centre

April 15	Medicine Hat Tigers	1 – 2	2OT	Prince Albert Raiders	Medicine Hat Arena

April 17	Prince Albert Raiders	3 – 0	Medicine Hat Tigers	Art Hauser Centre

Prince Albert wins series 4 – 2

==== (E1) Brandon Wheat Kings vs. (C3) Calgary Hitmen ====
April 8	Brandon Wheat Kings	1 – 10	Calgary Hitmen	Keystone Centre

April 9	Brandon Wheat Kings	5 – 1	Calgary Hitmen	Keystone Centre

April 12	Calgary Hitmen	3 – 1	Brandon Wheat Kings	Scotiabank Saddledome

April 13	Calgary Hitmen	4 – 2	Brandon Wheat Kings	Scotiabank Saddledome

April 15	Brandon Wheat Kings	6 – 4	Calgary Hitmen	Keystone Centre

April 18	Calgary Hitmen	1 – 3	Brandon Wheat Kings	Scotiabank Saddledome

April 20	Brandon Wheat Kings	3 – 1	Calgary Hitmen	Keystone Centre

Brandon wins series 4 – 3

==== (B1) Kootenay Ice vs. (U3) Everett Silvertips ====
April 8	Kootenay Ice	4 – 2	Everett Silvertips	Cranbrook Recreational Complex
16:38 - - pp - Derek Price (1)		First period	Curtis Billsten (1) - 1:41
No scoring		Second period	No scoring
5:10 - Adam Cracknell (2); 7:14 - Steve DaSilva (3); 17:17 - en - Martin Šagát (4)		Third period	Ivan Baranka (2) - 6:33
Jeff Glass (23 saves / 25 shots)		Goalie stats	Michael Wall (35 saves / 38 shots

April 9	Kootenay Ice	4 – 1	Everett Silvertips	Cranbrook Recreational Complex

April 11	Everett Silvertips	2 – 3	OT	Kootenay Ice	Everett Event Center

April 12	Everett Silvertips	3 – 4	OT	Kootenay Ice	Everett Event Center

Kootenay wins series 4 – 0

==== (U1) Seattle Thunderbirds vs. (B2) Kelowna Rockets ====
April 8	Kelowna Rockets	1 – 2	Seattle Thunderbirds	Prospera Place

April 9	Kelowna Rockets	2 – 3	Seattle Thunderbirds	Prospera Place

April 12	Seattle Thunderbirds	0 – 4	Kelowna Rockets	Key Arena

April 14	Seattle Thunderbirds	0 – 7	Kelowna Rockets	Key Arena

April 15	Kelowna Rockets	2 – 3	Seattle Thunderbirds	Prospera Place

April 17	Seattle Thunderbirds	0 – 2	Kelowna Rockets	Key Arena

April 19	Kelowna Rockets	2 – 1	Seattle Thunderbirds	Prospera Place

Kelowna wins series 4 – 3

=== Conference finals ===
==== (E1) Brandon Wheat Kings vs. (E3) Prince Albert Raiders ====
April 22	Brandon Wheat Kings	4 – 2	Prince Albert Raiders	Keystone Centre

April 23	Brandon Wheat Kings	2 – 3	Prince Albert Raiders	Keystone Centre

April 26	Prince Albert Raiders	1 – 5	Brandon Wheat Kings	Art Hauser Centre

April 27	Prince Albert Raiders	4 – 2	Brandon Wheat Kings	Art Hauser Centre

April 29	Brandon Wheat Kings	5 – 4	Prince Albert Raiders	Keystone Centre

May 1	Prince Albert Raiders	3 – 2	OT	Brandon Wheat Kings	Art Hauser Centre

May 3	Brandon Wheat Kings	5 – 1	Prince Albert Raiders	Keystone Centre

Brandon wins series 4 – 3

==== (B1) Kootenay Ice vs. (B2) Kelowna Rockets ====
April 22	Kootenay Ice	2 – 4	Kelowna Rockets	Cranbrook Recreational Complex

April 23	Kootenay Ice	3 – 2	Kelowna Rockets	Cranbrook Recreational Complex

April 26	Kelowna Rockets	4 – 1	Kootenay Ice	Prospera Place

April 27	Kelowna Rockets	5 – 4	OT	Kootenay Ice	Prospera Place

April 29	Kootenay Ice	2 – 1	2OT	Kelowna Rockets	Cranbrook Recreational Complex

May 1	Kelowna Rockets	2 – 1	OT	Kootenay Ice	Prospera Place

Kelowna wins series 4 – 2

=== WHL Championship ===
==== (E1) Brandon Wheat Kings vs. (B2) Kelowna Rockets ====
May 6	Kelowna Rockets	3 – 0	Brandon Wheat Kings	Prospera Place

May 7	Kelowna Rockets	4 – 1	Brandon Wheat Kings	Prospera Place

May 10	Brandon Wheat Kings	3 – 2	Kelowna Rockets	Keystone Centre

May 11	Brandon Wheat Kings	1 – 2	OT	Kelowna Rockets	Keystone Centre

May 13	Brandon Wheat Kings	3 – 8	Kelowna Rockets	Keystone Centre

Kelowna wins series 4 – 1

== ADT Canada-Russia Challenge ==
On December 1, Team WHL defeated the Russian Selects 6–0 in Red Deer, Alberta before a crowd of 6,443.

On December 2, Team WHL defeated the Russian Selects 5–2 in Lethbridge, Alberta before a crowd of 5,152.

== WHL awards ==
Four Broncos Memorial Trophy (Player of the Year): Eric Fehr, Brandon Wheat Kings
Daryl K. (Doc) Seaman Trophy (Scholastic Player of the Year): Gilbert Brule, Vancouver Giants
Scholastic Team of the Year: Vancouver Giants
Bob Clarke Trophy (Top scorer): Eric Fehr, Brandon Wheat Kings
Brad Hornung Trophy (Most Sportsmanlike Player): Kris Russell, Medicine Hat Tigers
Bill Hunter Trophy (Top Defenseman): Dion Phaneuf, Red Deer Rebels
Jim Piggott Memorial Trophy (Rookie of the Year): Tyler Plante, Brandon Wheat Kings
Del Wilson Trophy (Top Goaltender): Jeff Glass, Kootenay Ice
Dunc McCallum Memorial Trophy (Coach of the Year): Cory Clouston, Kootenay Ice
Lloyd Saunders Memorial Trophy (Executive of the Year): Jeff Chynoweth, Kootenay Ice
Scotty Munro Memorial Trophy (Best regular season record): Kootenay Ice
Allen Paradice Memorial Trophy (Top Official): Rob Matsuoka
St. Clair Group Trophy (Marketing/Public Relations Award): Roger Lemire, Vancouver Giants
Doug Wickenheiser Memorial Trophy (Humanitarian of the Year): Colin Fraser, Red Deer Rebels
WHL Plus-Minus Award: James Cherewyk, Kootenay Ice
WHL Playoff Most Valuable Player: Shea Weber, Kelowna Rockets

== All-Star teams ==
Eastern Conference
	First Team		Second Team	
Goal	Aaron Sorochan	Lethbridge Hurricanes	Kevin Nastiuk	Medicine Hat Tigers
Defense	Dion Phaneuf	Red Deer Rebels	Kris Russell	Medicine Hat Tigers
Defense	Mike Green	Saskatoon Blades	Brent Seabrook	Lethbridge Hurricanes
Forward	Eric Fehr	Brandon Wheat Kings	Ryan Getzlaf	Calgary Hitmen
Forward	Clarke MacArthur	Medicine Hat Tigers	Ryan Keller	Saskatoon Blades
Forward	Ryan Stone	Brandon Wheat Kings	Colton Yellow Horn	Lethbridge Hurricanes
Western Conference
	First Team		Second Team	
Goal	Jeff Glass	Kootenay Ice	Bryan Bridges	Seattle Thunderbirds
Defense	Shea Weber	Kelowna Rockets	Andrej Meszaros	Vancouver Giants
Defense	Braydon Coburn	Portland Winter Hawks	Clayton Stoner	Tri-City Americans
Forward	Gilbert Brule	Vancouver Giants	Dan DaSilva	Portland Winter Hawks
Forward	Nigel Dawes	Kootenay Ice	Chad Klassen	Spokane Chiefs
Forward	Aaron Gagnon	Seattle Thunderbirds	Dale Mahovsky	Kootenay Ice

- source: Western Hockey League press release

== 2005 Bantam Draft ==
The 2005 WHL Bantam Draft was the 16th annual draft into the WHL. It was held at the WHL head office in Calgary, on May 5, 2005.

List of first round picks in the bantam draft.

#	Player	Nationality	WHL Team
1	Colten Teubert (D)	Canada	Regina Pats
2	Geordie Wudrick (LW)	Canada	Swift Current Broncos
3	Dale Hunt (RW)	Canada	Prince George Cougars
4	Mitch Wahl (C)	United States	Spokane Chiefs
5	Neal Prokop (C)	Canada	Moose Jaw Warriors
6	Tyler Shattock (RW)	Canada	Kamloops Blazers
7	Eric Mestery (D)	Canada	Tri-City Americans
8	Jordan Trach (LW)	Canada	Prince Albert Raiders
9	James Wright (C)	Canada	Vancouver Giants
10	Kyle Beach (C)	Canada	Everett Silvertips
11	Thomas Frazee (C)	Canada	Portland Winter Hawks
12	Cassidy Mappin (C)	Canada	Red Deer Rebels
13	Brendon Rowinski (C)	Canada	Calgary Hitmen
14	Teigan Zahn (D)	Canada	Saskatoon Blades
15	Travis Bobbee (D)	Canada	Lethbridge Hurricanes
16	Cody Hanson (RW)	Canada	Seattle Thunderbirds
17	Sanfred King (C)	Canada	Brandon Wheat Kings
18	Jordan Hickmott (C)	Canada	Medicine Hat Tigers
19	Tyler Myers (D)	Canada	Kelowna Rockets
20	Jordan Wilkins (D)	Canada	Kootenay Ice

== See also ==
- 2005 NHL entry draft
- 2004 in sports
- 2005 in sports

Preceded by 2003–04 WHL season	WHL seasons	Succeeded by 2005–06 WHL season
