= Brian Kilrea Coach of the Year Award =

Annual Canadian Hockey League award (1988–)

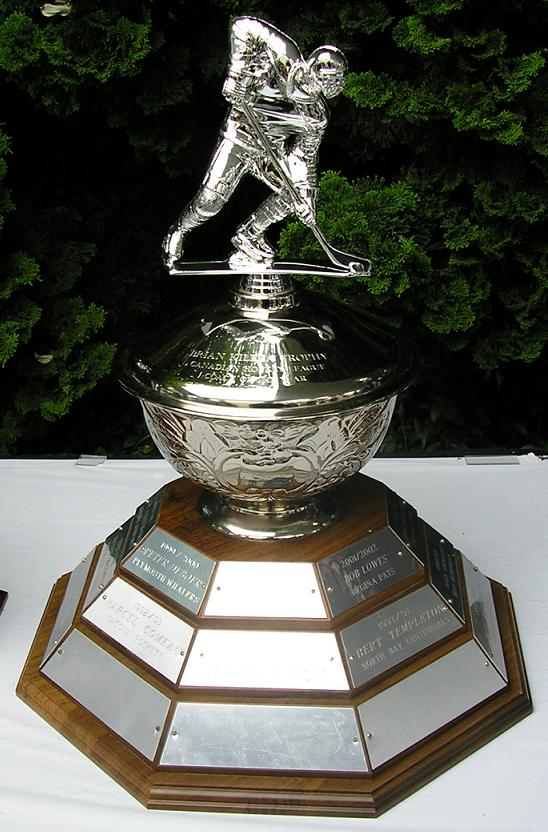
- Sport: Ice hockey
- Awarded for: Top coach in the Canadian Hockey League

History
- First award: 1988
- First winner: Alain Vigneault
- Most wins: Bob Boughner; Bob Lowes; Gerard Gallant (2)
- Most recent: Steve Hamilton

The Brian Kilrea Coach of the Year Award is given out annually to the coach of the year in the Canadian Hockey League (CHL). Originally called the CHL Coach of the Year Award, the trophy was renamed in 2003 to honour Brian Kilrea when he won his 1,000th game as the coach of the Ottawa 67's. Kilrea has won more games than any other coach in Canadian junior hockey history, two Memorial Cup championships and was inducted into the Hockey Hall of Fame in 2003. He was named the OHL's top coach five times in his 32-year coaching career, and won the CHL Coach of the Year Award once, in 1996–97.

The winner is named from one of the recipients of the Coach of the Year Award in the CHL's three constituent leagues: the Matt Leyden Trophy (Ontario Hockey League Coach of the Year), the Ron Lapointe Trophy (Quebec Major Junior Hockey League Coach of the Year), or the Dunc McCallum Memorial Trophy (Western Hockey League Coach of the Year). Bob Boughner (OHL), Bob Lowes (WHL), and Gerard Gallant (QMJHL) are the only coaches to capture the award twice.

== Winners ==
Season	Winner	Team	League	Finalists
1987–88	Alain Vigneault	Hull Olympiques	QMJHL	Dick Todd (OHL), Marcel Comeau (WHL)
1988–89	Joe McDonnell	Kitchener Rangers	OHL	Ron Kennedy (WHL)
1989–90	Ken Hitchcock	Kamloops Blazers	WHL	Joe McDonnell (OHL)
1990–91	Jos Canale	Chicoutimi Saguenéens	QMJHL	George Burnett (OHL), Tom Renney (WHL)
1991–92	Bryan Maxwell	Spokane Chiefs	WHL	George Burnett (OHL)
1992–93	Marcel Comeau	Tacoma Rockets	WHL	Gary Agnew (OHL), Guy Chouinard (QMJHL)
1993–94	Bert Templeton	North Bay Centennials	OHL	Richard Martel (QMJHL), Lorne Molleken (WHL)
1994–95	Craig Hartsburg	Guelph Storm	OHL	Michel Therrien (QMJHL), Don Nachbaur (WHL)
1995–96	Bob Lowes	Brandon Wheat Kings	WHL	Brian Kilrea (OHL), Jean Pronovost (QMJHL)
1996–97	Brian Kilrea	Ottawa 67's	OHL	Clement Jodoin (QMJHL), Brent Peterson (WHL)
1997–98	Dean Clark	Calgary Hitmen	WHL	Gary Agnew (OHL), Guy Chouinard (QMJHL)
1998–99	Guy Chouinard	Quebec Remparts	QMJHL	Peter DeBoer (OHL), Don Hay (WHL)
1999–2000	Peter DeBoer	Plymouth Whalers	OHL	Doris Labonté (QMJHL), Todd McLellan (WHL)
2000–01	Brent Sutter	Red Deer Rebels	WHL	Dave MacQueen (OHL), Denis Francoeur (QMJHL)
2001–02	Bob Lowes	Regina Pats	WHL	Craig Hartsburg (OHL), Real Paiement (QMJHL)
2002–03	Marc Habscheid	Kelowna Rockets	WHL	Brian Kilrea (OHL), Shawn MacKenzie (QMJHL)
2003–04	Dale Hunter	London Knights	OHL	Benoit Groulx (QMJHL), Kevin Constantine (WHL)
2004–05	Cory Clouston	Kootenay Ice	WHL	Dale Hunter (OHL), Richard Martel (QMJHL)
2005–06	Willie Desjardins	Medicine Hat Tigers	WHL	Dave Barr (OHL), Andre Tourigny (QMJHL)
2006–07	Clement Jodoin	Lewiston Maineiacs	QMJHL	Mike Vellucci (OHL), Cory Clouston (WHL)
2007–08	Bob Boughner	Windsor Spitfires	OHL	Pascal Vincent (QMJHL), Don Nachbaur (WHL)
2008–09	Bob Boughner	Windsor Spitfires	OHL	Danny Flynn (QMJHL), Don Hay (WHL)
2009–10	Gerard Gallant	Saint John Sea Dogs	QMJHL	Dale Hunter (OHL), Mark Holick (WHL)
2010–11	Gerard Gallant	Saint John Sea Dogs	QMJHL	Mark Reeds (OHL), Don Nachbaur (WHL)
2011–12	Jim Hiller	Tri-City Americans	WHL	Jean-Francois Houle (QMJHL), Greg Gilbert (OHL)
2012–13	Dominique Ducharme	Halifax Mooseheads	QMJHL	Ryan McGill (WHL), Mike Vellucci (OHL)
2013–14	Eric Veilleux	Baie-Comeau Drakkar	QMJHL	Dave Lowry (WHL), D.J Smith (OHL)
2014–15	Sheldon Keefe	Sault Ste. Marie Greyhounds	OHL	Joël Bouchard (QMJHL), John Paddock (WHL)
2015–16	Gilles Bouchard	Rouyn-Noranda Huskies	QMJHL	Kris Knoblauch (OHL), Dave Lowry (WHL)
2016–17	Ryan McGill	Owen Sound Attack	OHL	Danny Flynn (QMJHL), John Paddock (WHL)
2017–18	Drew Bannister	Sault Ste. Marie Greyhounds	OHL	Joël Bouchard (QMJHL), Emanuel Viveiros (WHL)
2018–19	Mario Pouliot	Rouyn-Noranda Huskies	QMJHL	Marc Habscheid (WHL), André Tourigny (OHL)
2019–20	André Tourigny	Ottawa 67's	OHL	Stéphane Julien (QMJHL), Brad Lauer (WHL)
2020–21	Not awarded due to COVID-19 pandemic			
2021–22	Jim Hulton	Charlottetown Islanders	QMJHL	James Richmond (OHL), James Patrick (WHL)
2022–23	Dave Cameron	Ottawa 67's	OHL	Stéphane Julien (QMJHL), Brennan Sonne (WHL)
2023–24	Jean-François Grégoire	Baie-Comeau Drakkar	QMJHL	Derek Laxdal (OHL), Mark Lamb (WHL)
2024–25	Gardiner MacDougall	Moncton Wildcats	QMJHL	Jussi Ahokas (OHL), James Patrick (WHL)
2026–26	Steve Hamilton	Everett Silvertips	WHL	Dave Cameron (OHL), Sylvain Favreau (QMJHL)

== See also ==
- List of Canadian Hockey League awards
