= Dunc McCallum Memorial Trophy =

The Dunc McCallum Memorial Trophy is awarded annually to the Coach of the Year in the Western Hockey League. It was originally known as the WHL Coach of the Year Award until 1983, when named in honour of Dunc McCallum, who coached the Brandon Wheat Kings from 1976–81, compiling a 251–123–41 record during that time, winning the WHL Championship in 1979.

== List of winners ==
WHL Coach of the Year Award
Season	Coach	Team
1968–69	Scotty Munro	Calgary Centennials
1969–70	Pat Ginnell	Flin Flon Bombers
1970–71	Pat Ginnell	Flin Flon Bombers
1971–72	Earl Ingarfield, Sr.	Regina Pats
1972–73	Pat Ginnell	Flin Flon Bombers
1973–74	Stan Dunn	Swift Current Broncos
1974–75	Pat Ginnell	Victoria Cougars
1975–76	Punch McLean	New Westminster Bruins
1976–77	Dunc McCallum	Brandon Wheat Kings
1977–78	(tie) Dave King	Billings Bighorns
	(tie) Jack Shupe	Victoria Cougars
1978–79	Dunc McCallum	Brandon Wheat Kings
1979–80	Doug Sauter	Calgary Wranglers
1980–81	Ken Hodge	Portland Winter Hawks
1981–82	Jack Sangster	Seattle Thunderbirds
1982–83	Daryl Lubiniecki	Saskatoon Blades
Dunc McCallum Memorial Trophy
Season	Coach	Team
1983–84	Terry Simpson	Prince Albert Raiders
1984–85	Doug Sauter	Medicine Hat Tigers
1985–86	Terry Simpson	Prince Albert Raiders
1986–87^{1}	(West) Ken Hitchcock	Kamloops Blazers
	(East) Graham James	Swift Current Broncos
1987–88	Marcel Comeau	Saskatoon Blades
1988–89	Ron Kennedy	Medicine Hat Tigers
1989–90	Ken Hitchcock	Kamloops Blazers
1990–91	Tom Renney	Kamloops Blazers
1991–92	Bryan Maxwell	Spokane Chiefs
1992–93	Marcel Comeau	Tacoma Rockets
1993–94	Lorne Molleken	Saskatoon Blades
1994–95	Don Nachbaur	Seattle Thunderbirds
1995–96	Bob Lowes	Brandon Wheat Kings
1996–97	Brent Peterson	Portland Winter Hawks
1997–98	Dean Clark	Calgary Hitmen
1998–99	Don Hay	Tri-City Americans
1999–2000	Todd McLellan	Swift Current Broncos
2000–01	Brent Sutter	Red Deer Rebels
2001–02	Bob Lowes	Regina Pats
2002–03	Marc Habscheid	Kelowna Rockets
2003–04	Kevin Constantine	Everett Silvertips
2004–05	Cory Clouston	Kootenay Ice
2005–06	Willie Desjardins	Medicine Hat Tigers
2006–07	Cory Clouston	Kootenay Ice
2007–08	Don Nachbaur	Tri-City Americans
2008–09	Don Hay	Vancouver Giants
2009–10	Mark Holick	Kootenay Ice
2010–11	Don Nachbaur	Spokane Chiefs
2011–12	Jim Hiller	Tri-City Americans
2012–13	Ryan McGill	Kootenay Ice
2013–14	Dave Lowry	Victoria Royals
2014–15	John Paddock	Regina Pats
2015–16	Dave Lowry	Victoria Royals
2016–17	John Paddock	Regina Pats
2017–18	Emanuel Viveiros	Swift Current Broncos
2018–19	Marc Habscheid	Prince Albert Raiders
2019–20	Brad Lauer	Edmonton Oil Kings
2020–21	not awarded	
2021–22	James Patrick	Winnipeg Ice
2022–23	Brennan Sonne	Saskatoon Blades
2023–24	Mark Lamb	Prince George Cougars
2024–25	James Patrick	Victoria Royals
2025–26	Steve Hamilton	Everett Silvertips

- Blue background denotes also named CHL Coach of the Year

^{1}The WHL handed out separate awards for the East and West divisions.

== See also ==
- Brian Kilrea Coach of the Year Award
- Matt Leyden Trophy - Ontario Hockey League Coach of the Year
- Ron Lapointe Trophy - Quebec Major Junior Hockey League Coach of the Year
