= Bob Lowes =

Canadian ice hockey executive and coach (born 1963)

- Born: January 21, 1963 (age 63); Prince Albert, Saskatchewan, Canada
- Education: University of Manitoba
- Occupation: Assistant director of player development
- Employer: Vegas Golden Knights
- Known for: Ice hockey coach
- Awards: CHL Coach of the Year (1995–96, 2001–02)

Robert Lowes (born January 21, 1963) is a Canadian ice hockey executive, and former ice hockey coach. He has worked as the assistant director of player personnel for the Vegas Golden Knights since 2016. Lowes led the Nipawin Hawks to the 1990 ANAVET Cup championship, before being a head coach in the Western Hockey League (WHL) for 12 seasons with the Brandon Wheat Kings, and the Regina Pats. He twice won the Dunc McCallum Memorial Trophy as the WHL Coach of the Year, and twice won the CHL Coach of the Year Award. Lowes also coached the Canada men's national under-18 ice hockey team, and later became director of amateur scouting for the Ottawa Senators.

== Early life ==
Lowes was born January 21, 1963, in Prince Albert, Saskatchewan.

== Playing career ==
Lowes played the centreman position in hockey. He played three seasons for the Prince Albert Raiders in the Saskatchewan Junior Hockey League (SJHL) from 1979 to 1982, and was the team's captain during the 1981–82 season. Lowes and his team won both the Hanbidge Cup as SJHL champions, and the ANAVET Cup as the Saskatchewan–Manitoba champions all three seasons, lost in the 1980 Abbott Cup finals, but won the 1981 and 1982 Abbott Cup, and both the 1981 Centennial Cup and the 1982 Centennial Cup. Lowes was eligible for the 1981 NHL Entry Draft, but was not chosen until a year later, being selected 204th overall by the New York Rangers in the tenth round of the 1982 NHL entry draft. He began the 1982–83 WHL season with Prince Albert, then was traded to the Regina Pats later in the season. Lowes served as captain of the Pats for the 1983–84 WHL season, in which his team lost in the seventh game of the President's Cup final. In the next year, he took a year off from playing and served as the assistant coach for the Pats in the 1984–85 season. During the season, he acted as an interim head coach while Bob Strumm served an eight-game suspension.

Lowes was recruited by Wayne Fleming to playing university hockey, and join the Manitoba Bisons program. He played parts of four seasons for the Bisons from 1985 to 1989. He was the team captain for the 1986–87 season, then became an assistant coach for the 1987–88 season due to an injury. Lowes said that he learned about the use of statistical analysis, and new perspective on coaching hockey from Fleming. Lowes graduated from the University of Manitoba in 1989, with a bachelor's degree in recreation.

=== Playing statistics ===
Career playing statistics			Regular season					Playoffs
Season	Team	League	GP	G	A	Pts	PIM	GP	G	A	Pts	PIM
1979–80	Prince Albert Raiders	SJHL	–	–	–	–	–	–	–	–	–	–
1980–81	Prince Albert Raiders	SJHL	–	–	–	–	–	–	–	–	–	–
1981–82	Prince Albert Raiders	SJHL	50	25	47	72	206	–	–	–	–	–
1982–83	Michigan State Spartans	CCHA	–	–	–	–	–	–	–	–	–	–
1982–83	Prince Albert Raiders	WHL	26	3	7	10	50	–	–	–	–	–
1982–83	Regina Pats	WHL	34	9	20	29	34	5	3	1	4	6
1983–84	Regina Pats	WHL	71	21	27	48	118	23	1	8	9	41
1985–86	Manitoba Bisons	CWUAA	28	8	13	21	70	–	–	–	–	–
WHL totals			131	33	54	87	202	28	4	9	13	47

== Coaching career ==
Lowes' first position as a head coach was with the Nipawin Hawks in the SJHL, for the 1989–90 and 1990–91 seasons. In the 1989–90 season, his team finished second place in the north division, then won the SJHL's Hanbidge Cup in the playoffs. The Hawks played the Portage Terriers, champions of Manitoba for the ANAVET Cup, winning the series four games to two. Lowes' team advanced to the national championship, and placed third at the 1990 Centennial Cup. In the 1990–91 season, Nipawin placed second place in the north division, and reached the second round of the playoffs. Lowes returned to the Western Hockey League (WHL) in the 1991–92 WHL season, as an assistant coach for the Seattle Thunderbirds.

=== Brandon Wheat Kings ===
Lowes was named head coach of the Brandon Wheat Kings on July 7, 1992. He coached the Wheat Kings until 2001, and has the second most wins as a head coach in franchise history as of 2018. During nine seasons as head coach, Lowes won 370 games in the regular season, three first-place finishes in the east division, reached the President's Cup three times and winning it in 1996. His Wheat Kings team appeared in the 1995 Memorial Cup in Kamloops, and the 1996 Memorial Cup in Peterborough, placing third both times. Lowes was named a co-coach along with Ted Nolan, of the combined WHL and Ontario Hockey League team in the 1993 CHL All–Star Challenge.

Notable players coached by Lowes on the Wheat Kings include, Johnathan Aitken, Milan Bartovic, Sven Butenschoen, Ryan Craig, Chris Dingman, Eric Fehr, Burke Henry, Mark Kolesar, Justin Kurtz, Kirby Law, Mike Leclerc, Mike Maneluk, Rob McVicar, Marty Murray, Wade Redden, Peter Schaefer, Jordin Tootoo, and Nolan Yonkman.

=== Regina Pats ===
Lowes began a three-year tenure as head coach of the Regina Pats on August 7, 2001. During the 2001–02 WHL season, he won his 400th game in the WHL, accomplishing it quicker than any other coach, in only 10 seasons. He was an associate coach for the Home Hardware Top Prospects Game on January 31, 2002. Lowes led Regina to a second-place finish in the east division, but were upset in the first round of the playoffs. In the 2002–03 WHL season, Lowes was suspended three games by the league, due to multiple fights in a game on March 15. Regina finished the season fourth place in the east division, and lost in the first round of the playoffs. In the 2003–04 WHL season, Regina repeated the fourth place finish, and lost in the first round of the playoffs.

=== National team ===
Lowes was an assistant coach for the Canada men's national under-18 ice hockey team at the 1993 Pacific Cup tournament in Yokohama, where Canada placed third. He returned as an assistant coach for the under-18 team at the 2002 IIHF World U18 Championships in Slovakia, where Canada placed sixth. He was named head coach of the under-18 team for the 2003 U-18 Junior World Cup in Slovakia, with Dave Cameron and Pascal Vincent as assistants. Canada had won seven consecutive gold medals at the event, but placed fourth in 2003.

=== Coaching record ===
Career statistics as a head coach with the Nipawin Hawks (1989–1991), and in the Western Hockey League (1992–2004).

Season	Team	League	Games	Won	Lost	Tied	OTL	Points	Pct.	Standing	Playoffs
1989–90	Nipawin Hawks	SJHL	68	43	21	4	–	90	0.662	2nd, North	Hanbidge Cup champions ANAVET Cup champions 3rd place, 1990 Centennial Cup
1990–91	Nipawin Hawks	SJHL	68	40	27	1	–	81	0.596	2nd, North	Lost, round 2
1992–93	Brandon Wheat Kings	WHL	72	43	25	4	–	90	0.625	2nd, East	Lost, round 1
1993–94	Brandon Wheat Kings	WHL	72	42	25	5	–	89	0.618	2nd, East	Lost, round 3
1994–95	Brandon Wheat Kings	WHL	72	45	22	5	–	95	0.660	1st, East	Lost, WHL finals 3rd place, 1995 Memorial Cup
1995–96	Brandon Wheat Kings	WHL	72	52	19	1	–	105	0.729	1st, East	Won President's Cup; 3rd place, 1996 Memorial Cup
1996–97	Brandon Wheat Kings	WHL	72	47	24	1	–	95	0.660	1st, East	Lost, round 1
1997–98	Brandon Wheat Kings	WHL	72	45	21	6	–	96	0.667	3rd, East	Lost, WHL finals
1998–99	Brandon Wheat Kings	WHL	72	39	29	4	–	82	0.569	2nd, East	Lost, round 1
1999–2000	Brandon Wheat Kings	WHL	72	25	38	4	5	59	0.410	5th, East	Out of playoffs
2000–01	Brandon Wheat Kings	WHL	72	32	32	5	3	72	0.500	4th, East	Lost, round 1
2001–02	Regina Pats	WHL	72	40	20	4	8	92	0.639	2nd, East	Lost, round 1
2002–03	Regina Pats	WHL	72	25	28	14	5	69	0.479	4th, East	Lost, round 1
2003–04	Regina Pats	WHL	72	24	37	7	4	59	0.410	4th, East	Lost, round 1
Totals		SJHL	136	83	48	5	–	171	0.629	–	1 championship
Totals		WHL	864	459	320	60	25	1003	0.580	3 division titles	1 championship 2 finalists

== Executive career ==
Lowes began his scouting career with the Brandon Wheat Kings as the chief scout from 2005 to 2007. He worked part-time as an amateur scout for the Ottawa Senators starting in 2006, then was hired full-time in 2008. He was promoted to director of amateur scouting in August 2014, and was responsible for the scouting staff of Ottawa in preparation for each NHL entry draft. Notable players drafted by Ottawa during his tenure as chief scout include Logan Brown, Thomas Chabot, Jared Cowen, Nick Foligno, Gabriel Gagne, Erik Karlsson, Curtis Lazar, Robin Lehner, Jakob Silfverberg, Mark Stone, Colin White, and Mika Zibanejad.

Lowes was hired by the Vegas Golden Knights September 30, 2016, to be the assistant director of player personnel under Vaughn Karpan. Lowes and Karpan has both previously been part of the Brandon Wheat Kings and the Manitoba Bisons. Lowes is one of five former Wheat Kings alumni to become executives for Vegas, including Karpan, Kelly McCrimmon, Mike Kelly, and his former player Ryan Craig. Lowes later won the Stanley Cup with Vegas in 2023.

== Honours and awards ==
Lowes received the Dunc McCallum Memorial Trophy as the WHL Coach of the Year, in the 1995–96, and 2001–02 seasons. He was also given the CHL Coach of the Year Award in the same seasons, becoming the first multiple winner of the award. Lowes was inducted into the Manitoba Bisons Hockey Hall of Fame on January 31, 2018.
