= Marcel Comeau =

Canadian ice hockey player and coach (born 1952)

- Born: March 1, 1952 (age 73); Edmonton, Alberta, Canada
- Occupation: Ice hockey scout
- Employer: Winnipeg Jets
- Known for: Ice hockey coach & player
- Awards: IHL Most Valuable Player (1981); CHL Coach of the Year (1993)

Marcel Comeau (born March 1, 1952) is a Canadian ice hockey scout, and former player, coach, and National Hockey League team executive. He played eleven seasons in the International Hockey League (IHL), where he was the league's top scorer and won the IHL Most Valuable Player Award in 1981. He later coached in the Western Hockey League (WHL), winning two WHL Coach of the Year Awards, and a Canadian Hockey League Coach of the Year Award. He also led Team Canada to a gold medal at the 1996 World Juniors, and later served as a team executive for the Atlanta Thrashers, and the Winnipeg Jets.

== Early life ==
Marcel Comeau was born on March 1, 1952, in Edmonton, Alberta. His parents, Emile and Anita Comeau, moved to Ponoka and operated the local Massey Ferguson retailer. He played minor ice hockey in town and attended Ponoka Composite High School. He played shortstop on the Ponoka Royals fast-pitch softball club as a youth, and played semi-professional softball in summers.

== Playing career ==
Comeau was a centreman during his playing career, listed at 6 feet (183 cm) and 165 pounds (75 kg) with a right-hand shot. He began playing junior ice hockey with the Ponoka Stampeders, and was named the Alberta Junior Hockey League rookie of year in the 1970–71 season, and led the league with 42 goals scored. He finished the 1970–71 season playing 11 games with the Edmonton Oil Kings in the Western Canada Hockey League. After one full season with Edmonton, he was drafted 148th overall by the Minnesota North Stars, in the tenth round of the 1972 NHL Amateur Draft.

Comeau never played in the National Hockey League, and spent eleven seasons playing with the Saginaw Gears in the International Hockey League (IHL). He was named an IHL second-team all-star in the 1973–74 IHL season, and the 1977–78 IHL season. Comeau led the league with 82 assists in the 1980–81 IHL season, led the league with 126 points and won the Leo P. Lamoureux Memorial Trophy as the top scorer, was named a first-team all-star, and won the James Gatschene Memorial Trophy as the IHL's most valuable player. In the 1976–77 IHL season, Comeau and the Saginaw Gears finished first place overall in the league winning the Fred A. Huber Trophy, and won the playoffs to capture a Turner Cup title. The team was inducted into the Saginaw County Sports Hall of Fame in 2014.

Comeau finished his playing career with the Maine Mariners in the American Hockey League (AHL), with seven games during the 1982–83 AHL season playoffs.

== Coaching career ==
Comeau began his coaching career with the Saginaw Gears during the 1981–82 IHL season, and the 1982–83 IHL season, until the team folded, acting as the player-coach and general manager. He became a full-time coach with the Calgary Wranglers for the 1983–84 WHL season.

Comeau switched to the Saskatoon Blades for the 1984–85 WHL season, and stayed with the team for five seasons. He led Saskatoon to improved records in three successive seasons, reaching the third round of the playoffs in the 1986–87 WHL season. Comeau led Saskatoon to 47 wins and the east division title in the 1987–88 WHL season, and was awarded the Dunc McCallum Memorial Trophy as the WHL Coach of the Year. The Blades moved out of Saskatoon Arena during his fifth season, into the new Saskatchewan Place, and were scheduled to host the 1989 Memorial Cup. Comeau led Saskatoon to second place in the east division with 42 wins, and into the third round of the 1988–89 WHL season playoffs. At the 1989 Memorial Cup, Comeau's Blades won 5–3 over the Laval Titan, lost 3–2 to the Peterborough Petes, and won 5–4 over the Swift Current Broncos to reach a berth in the finals. Saskatoon was leading in the third period of the Memorial Cup championship game, but were defeated 4–3 in overtime by Swift Current. Comeau stepped down from his position with the Blades on August 10, 1989.

Comeau was named director of hockey operations and head coach of the New Haven Nighthawks on August 11, 1989. In his first season coaching in the AHL, Comeau led the New Haven to seventh-place finish, and missed the playoffs. The following season, his team struggled again and Comeau became the first AHL coach to be fired mid-season in nearly six years, on November 29, 1990. Comeau took over as head coach of a struggling Winston-Salem Thunderbirds team in the East Coast Hockey League on January 12, 1991, but was unable to get his new team into the 1990-91 ECHL season playoffs.

Comeau was hired as the first head coach for the expansion Tacoma Rockets in the WHL, on April 17, 1991. In his 1992–93 WHL season with Tacoma, he led the team to 45 wins, and won his second Dunc McCallum Memorial Trophy as WHL Coach of Year. He also received the Coach of the Year Award for the Canadian Hockey League in the same season. Comeau served five seasons total with the Rockets, four of those in Tacoma, and a fifth season being the team's first year as the Kelowna Rockets in the 1995–96 WHL season.

== International duties ==
Comeau was head coach of the Canada men's national under-18 ice hockey team which captured the gold medal at the 1994 La Copa Mexico in Mexico City. Two years later he was head coach of the Canada men's national junior ice hockey team at the 1996 World Junior Ice Hockey Championships, which won a fourth consecutive gold medal at the World Juniors. Canada finished the round-robin winning all four games, defeated Russia 4–3 in the semifinals, and defeated Sweden 4–1 in the finals.

== Later career ==
Comeau served as the executive director of the Sno-King Amateur Hockey Association in the Snohomish County and King County areas, from 1996 to 2000. He also worked as a scout with the Independent RHO Hockey Service, and coached the Pacific under-17 team at the 1999 USA Hockey Festival. He was hired as a part-time scout for the Atlanta Thrashers by Don Waddell, a former teammate on the Saginaw Gears. He scouted part-time in Western Canada and the United States from October 1998, until becoming a full-time scout in the same regions in June 2000. On July 9, 2003, he was named director of amateur scouting for the Thrashers. He remained in the same position with the organization when it became the second incarnation of the Winnipeg Jets in 2011. In 2015, Comeau stepped down from his position, but remained with the Jets as an amateur scout.

== Playing statistics ==
Season-by-season career playing statistics.

			Regular Season					Playoffs
Season	Team	League	GP	G	A	Pts	PIM	GP	G	A	Pts	PIM
1970–71	Ponoka Stampeders	AJHL	49	42	38	80	32	–	–	–	–	–
1970–71	Edmonton Oil Kings	WCHL	11	6	12	18	0	–	–	–	–	–
1971–72	Edmonton Oil Kings	WCHL	48	16	29	45	27	–	–	–	–	–
1972–73	Saginaw Gears	IHL	68	20	36	56	18	–	–	–	–	–
1973–74	Saginaw Gears	IHL	76	31	51	82	40	13	3	5	8	4
1974–75	Saginaw Gears	IHL	71	19	40	59	16	19	5	11	16	8
1975–76	Saginaw Gears	IHL	64	33	44	77	12	11	3	5	8	6
1976–77	Saginaw Gears	IHL	58	27	32	59	17	19	9	14	23	11
1977–78	Saginaw Gears	IHL	64	42	61	103	16	5	3	5	8	4
1978–79	Saginaw Gears	IHL	80	45	65	110	23	3	0	0	0	4
1979–80	Saginaw Gears	IHL	74	33	57	90	26	7	8	2	10	2
1980–81	Saginaw Gears	IHL	81	44	82	126	20	13	1	10	11	4
1981–82	Saginaw Gears	IHL	66	33	69	102	26	14	4	15	19	10
1982–83	Saginaw Gears	IHL	30	12	22	34	28	–	–	–	–	–
1982–83	Maine Mariners	AHL	–	–	–	–	–	7	1	1	2	0
IHL Totals			732	339	559	898	242	104	36	67	103	53

== Coaching record ==
Season-by-season career coaching record.

Season	Team	League	GP	W	L	T	PTS	Pct	Standing	Playoffs
1981–82	Saginaw Gears	IHL	82	36	38	8	80	0.488	5th, IHL	Lost, IHL finals
1982–83	Saginaw Gears	IHL	82	29	44	9	67	0.409	4th, east	Out of playoffs
1983–84	Calgary Wranglers	WHL	72	36	36	0	72	0.500	6th, east	Lost, round 1
1984–85	Saskatoon Blades	WHL	72	29	41	2	60	0.417	6th, east	Lost, round 1
1985–86	Saskatoon Blades	WHL	72	38	28	6	82	0.569	4th, east	Lost, round 2
1986–87	Saskatoon Blades	WHL	72	44	26	2	90	0.625	2nd, east	Lost, round 3
1987–88	Saskatoon Blades	WHL	72	47	22	3	97	0.674	1st, east	Lost, round 3
1988–89	Saskatoon Blades	WHL	72	42	28	2	86	0.597	2nd, east	Lost, round 3; 1989 Memorial Cup finalists
1989–90	New Haven Nighthawks	AHL	80	32	41	7	71	0.444	7th, north	Out of playoffs
1990–91	New Haven Nighthawks	AHL	Statistics incomplete						7th, north	Fired November 30, 1990
1990–91	Winston-Salem Thunderbirds	ECHL	Statistics incomplete						6th, west	Out of playoffs
1991–92	Tacoma Rockets	WHL	72	24	43	5	53	0.368	6th, west	Lost, round 1
1992–93	Tacoma Rockets	WHL	72	45	27	0	90	0.625	2nd, west	Lost, round 1
1993–94	Tacoma Rockets	WHL	72	33	34	5	71	0.493	3rd, west	Lost, round 2
1994–95	Tacoma Rockets	WHL	72	43	27	2	88	0.611	2nd, west	Lost, round 1
1995–96	Kelowna Rockets	WHL	72	35	33	4	74	0.514	4th, west	Lost, round 1
WHL totals			792	416	345	31	863	0.545	1 division	1 Memorial Cup appearance
IHL totals			164	65	82	17	147	0.448	—	1 finalist
