= Calgary Hitmen =

Western Hockey League team in Alberta, Canada

- City: Calgary, Alberta
- League: Western Hockey League
- Conference: Eastern
- Division: Central
- Founded: 1994
- Home arena: Scotiabank Saddledome
- Colours: Black, Red, Copper, White
- Owner: Calgary Sports and Entertainment
- General manager: Garry Davidson
- Head coach: Dustin Friesen
- Website: chl.ca/whl-hitmen/

Championships
- Regular season titles: 4 (1998–99, 1999–2000, 2008–09, 2009–10)
- Playoff championships: Ed Chynoweth Cup; 2 (1999, 2010); Conference Championships; 3 (1998–99, 2008–09, 2009–10)

Current uniform

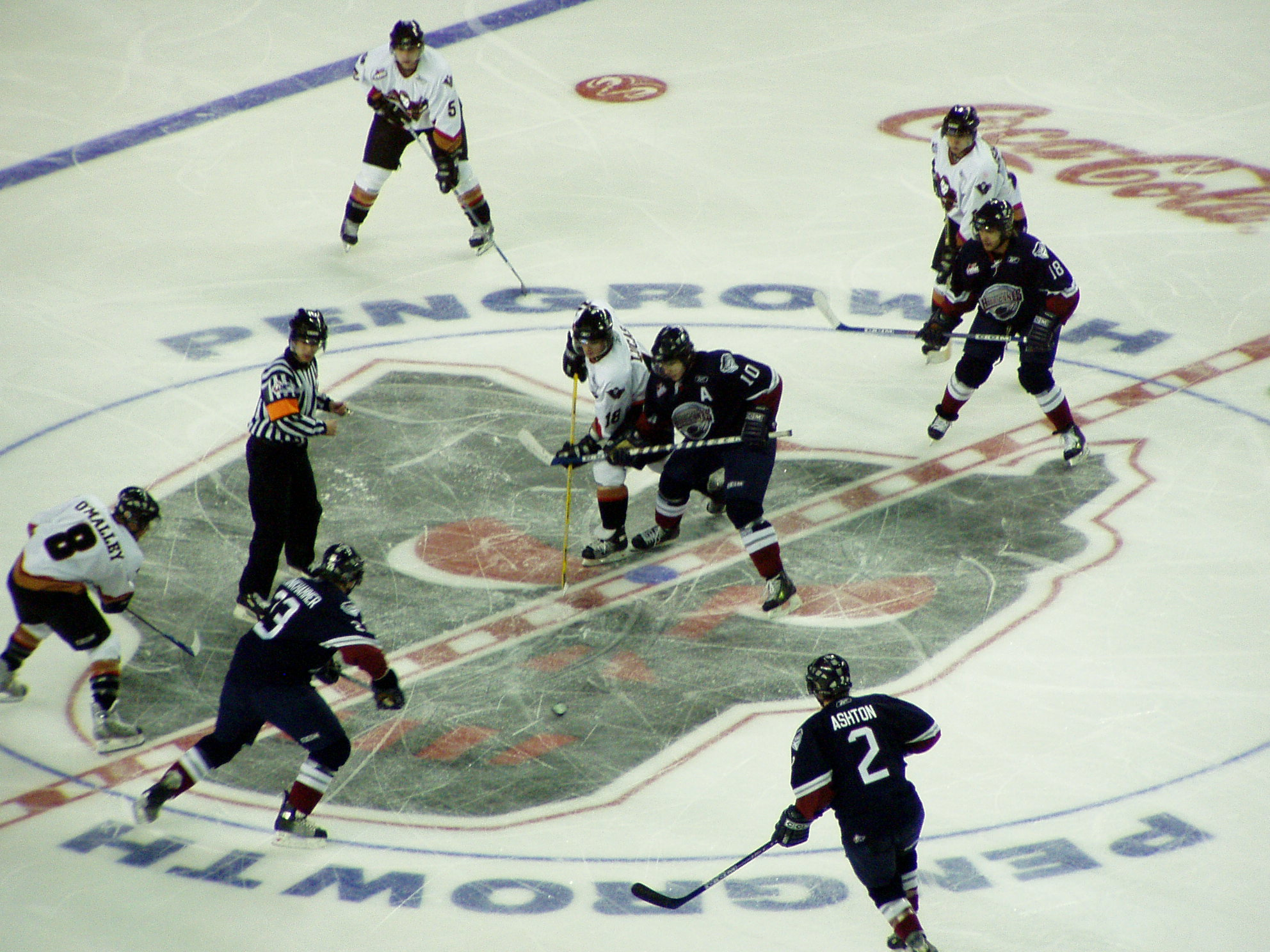
2005 playoff game against the Lethbridge Hurricanes at the Saddledome

The Calgary Hitmen are a Canadian junior ice hockey team based in Calgary. The Hitmen play in the Central Division of the Western Hockey League (WHL), hosting their home games at the Scotiabank Saddledome. Bret "Hitman" Hart, a professional wrestler and Calgary native, was a founding owner and the inspiration for the team's name. Established in 1994, the team has been owned by the Calgary Flames hockey club since 1997. They are the third WHL team based in Calgary, after the Centennials and Wranglers.

The Hitmen have won four regular season titles, and the team qualified for the playoffs for thirteen consecutive seasons between 1998 and 2010. In 1999, they became the first Calgary team to win the President's Cup as league champions, and the first to represent the city in the Memorial Cup since the Calgary Canadians won the national junior title in 1926. The team won a second league championship in 2010. The Hitmen hold numerous WHL attendance records, and in 2004–05 became the first team in Canadian Hockey League history to average 10,000 fans per game. Thirty-nine former Hitmen players have gone on to play in the National Hockey League.

== Franchise history ==
=== Founding and early tumult ===
Graham James left his position as coach and general manager of the Swift Current Broncos to found the Hitmen in 1994. He organized a group of eighteen investors in the club, including former Broncos and star National Hockey League players Theoren Fleury and Joe Sakic, along with Bret Hart, who made a career in the World Wrestling Federation. The Calgary Flames, who had just assumed control of the Saddledome and were looking to fill extra dates in the building, were receptive to the new team. When scheduling conflicts occurred, the Hitmen used the Stampede Corral as a secondary venue—including for the first seven games in club history.

Calgary had been without a WHL team since the Wranglers moved south to become the Lethbridge Hurricanes in 1987. The league's expansion into Calgary was met with skepticism, as the league had historically struggled in Western Canada's largest markets of Vancouver, Edmonton, Calgary, and Winnipeg, when in competition with the NHL.

The Hitmen entered their first season playing in the newly formed Central Division, and were predicted to finish as high as third in the five-team division. Instead, they finished as the second-worst regular season team in the league, posting an 18–51–3 record. The Hitmen lost $250,000 in their first season and saw their season ticket base halved to 700 for the 1996–97 season. The losses led to questions about the viability of the club.

James stunned the organization when he resigned as coach and general manager on September 5, 1996. Two days later, the Calgary Police Service revealed that James was being investigated on allegations he sexually abused two former players while he was with the Swift Current Broncos. James was charged, and in January 1997 pleaded guilty to two counts of sexual assault. Upon James' conviction and sentencing to prison, the Hitmen attempted to distance themselves from their former coach.

The Hitmen struggled on the ice as well, again missing the playoffs after falling to a record of 15–53–4. The spectre of the Graham James scandal hurt the franchise. The original investors, many of whom played for or were otherwise associated with James, sold the team to the Flames for approximately $1.5 million in June 1997. It was widely speculated that the new owners would change the team name, possibly to the Junior Flames; however, they ultimately chose to retain the name.

=== First championship ===
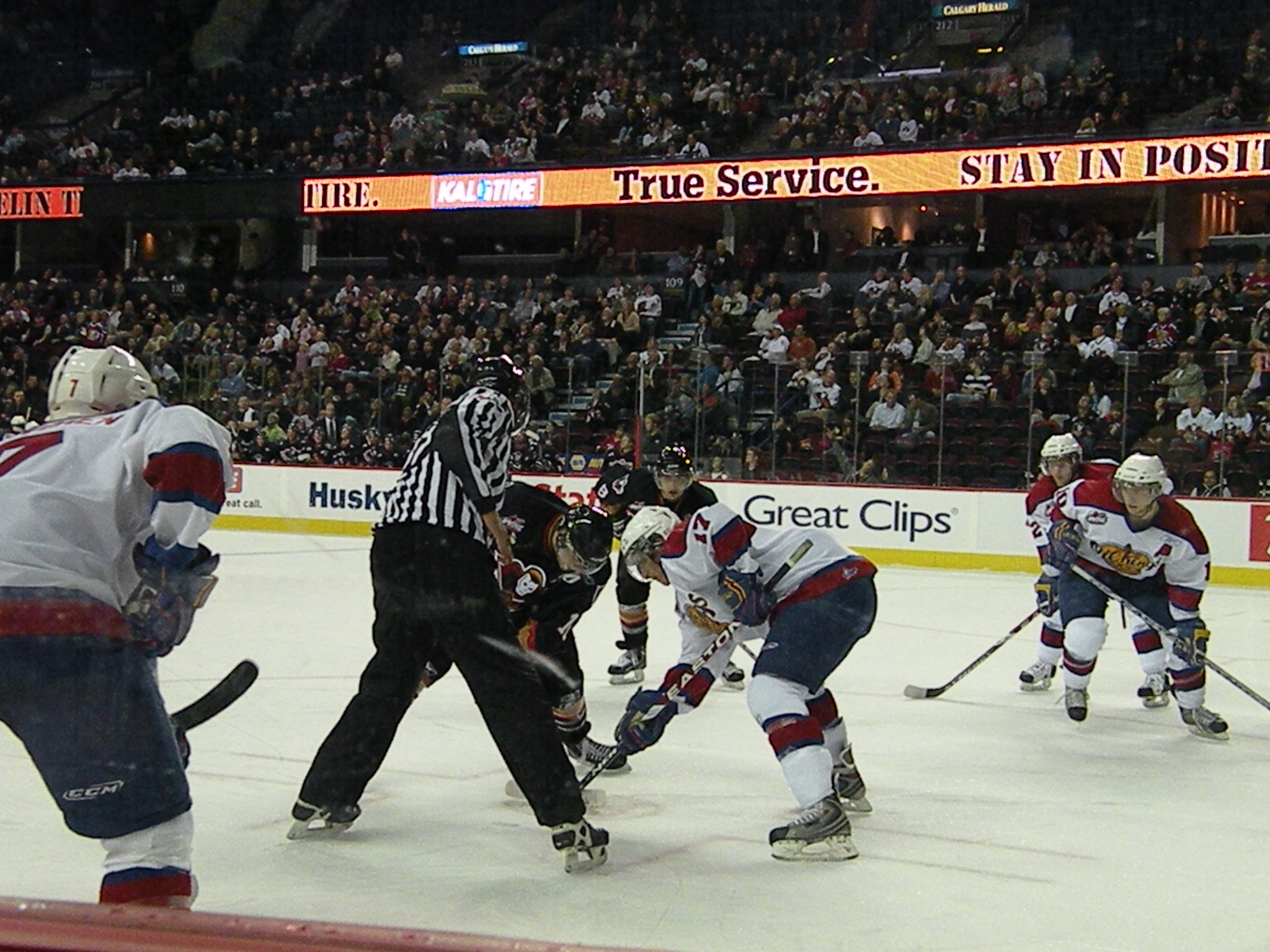
The Hitmen face the Edmonton Oil Kings in the WHL's "Battle of Alberta".

Dean Clark took over as head coach shortly after James' resignation, and led the 1997–98 Hitmen to a significant turnaround. The team improved to a 40–28–4 record and first-place finish in the Central Division, qualifying for the playoffs for the first time in franchise history. They defeated the Saskatoon Blades and Swift Current Broncos to reach the Eastern Conference final before falling to the Brandon Wheat Kings. Clark was awarded the Dunc McCallum Memorial Trophy as the WHL's top coach, and also won the Canadian Hockey League's Brian Kilrea Coach of the Year Award. Calgary improved to 51–13–8 in 1998–99, finishing one point ahead of the Kamloops Blazers for the Scotty Munro Memorial Trophy for best regular season record. Led by Brad Moran, Pavel Brendl, and goaltender Alexandre Fomitchev, the Hitmen lost just five games in the playoffs en route to their first President's Cup. They won the title at home before a WHL playoff record crowd of 17,139. They became the first Calgary-based team to qualify for the Memorial Cup since the Calgary Canadians won the 1926 title.

In the 1999 Memorial Cup, the Hitmen opened the tournament with a 5–3 victory over the Ontario Hockey League's Belleville Bulls, followed by a 4–3 loss to the host Ottawa 67's. They followed with a 3–1 win over the Acadie-Bathurst Titan of the Quebec Major Junior Hockey League. Finishing atop the round robin standings, the Hitmen earned a bye into the championship game, a rematch against the 67's. The final was a back-and-forth affair with Ottawa holding 4–1 and 6–5 leads; Calgary tied the game late to send it to overtime. Ottawa's Matt Zultek scored the winning goal 1:58 into overtime to give the 67's the championship. Brendl and Matt Kinch were named to the Memorial Cup All-Star team.

The Hitmen entered the 1999–2000 season with expectations of making another Memorial Cup run. The club finished the regular season with a record of 58–12–2–2, once again winning the regular season title. The team set franchise records for victories (58) and points (120), which stood until the 2008–09 year. After sweeping the Moose Jaw Warriors and Saskatoon Blades, the Hitmen were upset by the Kootenay Ice in the Eastern Conference final, falling four games to one.

=== Turn of the century ===
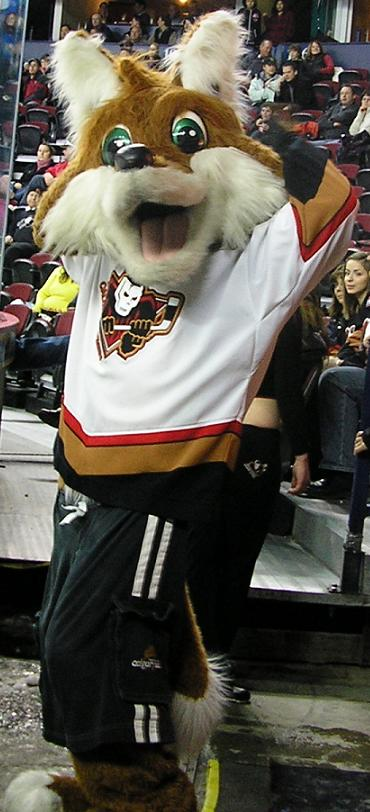
Hitmen mascot Farley the Fox

The Hitmen went through a rebuilding period and finished third or fourth in the Central Division between 2001 and 2004, winning only one playoff series during that time. The Hitmen acquired goaltender Justin Pogge from the Prince George Cougars during the 2004–05 season. Pogge's goaltending, along with the offensive leadership of forward Andrew Ladd, saw the Hitmen win their first playoff series in four years. They could not follow up on their victory over the Lethbridge Hurricanes, losing their second round series against the Brandon Wheat Kings in seven games.

The Hitmen were heavily marketed by the Flames during the NHL's 2004–05 lock-out. As a result, the Hitmen averaged 10,062 fans per game and set a new league attendance record. The season total of 362,227 fans easily beat the old record by over 45,000. The Hitmen became the first Canadian Hockey League team to average over 10,000 fans per game, having the highest average attendance of any hockey team—junior or professional—in North America that year.

The 2005–06 Hitmen battled the Medicine Hat Tigers for the top spot in the Western Hockey League for most of the season. Calgary finished with 101 points, their best total since 1999–2000, finishing two points behind Medicine Hat for the best record in the league. The team disappointed in the playoffs, falling to the Moose Jaw Warriors in the Eastern Conference semi-final. Pogge's performance during the season earned him honours as both the WHL player of the year and CHL goaltender of the year. Calgary fell to third in the Central Division in 2006–07. In the playoffs, they upset the Kootenay Ice, who finished 19-points ahead of Calgary in the regular season. The Hitmen then defeated the East Division champion Brandon Wheat Kings to reach the Eastern Conference final for the fourth time in franchise history, where they were defeated by the Tigers.

The Hitmen entered the 2007–08 season with expectation of being contenders, voted the pre-season pick to finish atop the Eastern Conference by the league's coaches and general managers. The team lived up to expectations, winning the Central Division, and finishing with the best record in the East for the first time since 2000. During a late season game, Calgary broke the league's single-game attendance record, as an announced crowd of 19,305 watched Calgary defeat Kootenay by a score of 6–1. In the playoffs, the Hitmen defeated the Moose Jaw Warriors and Swift Current Broncos in six games apiece, advancing to the Eastern Conference finals for the second consecutive season.

=== Second championship ===
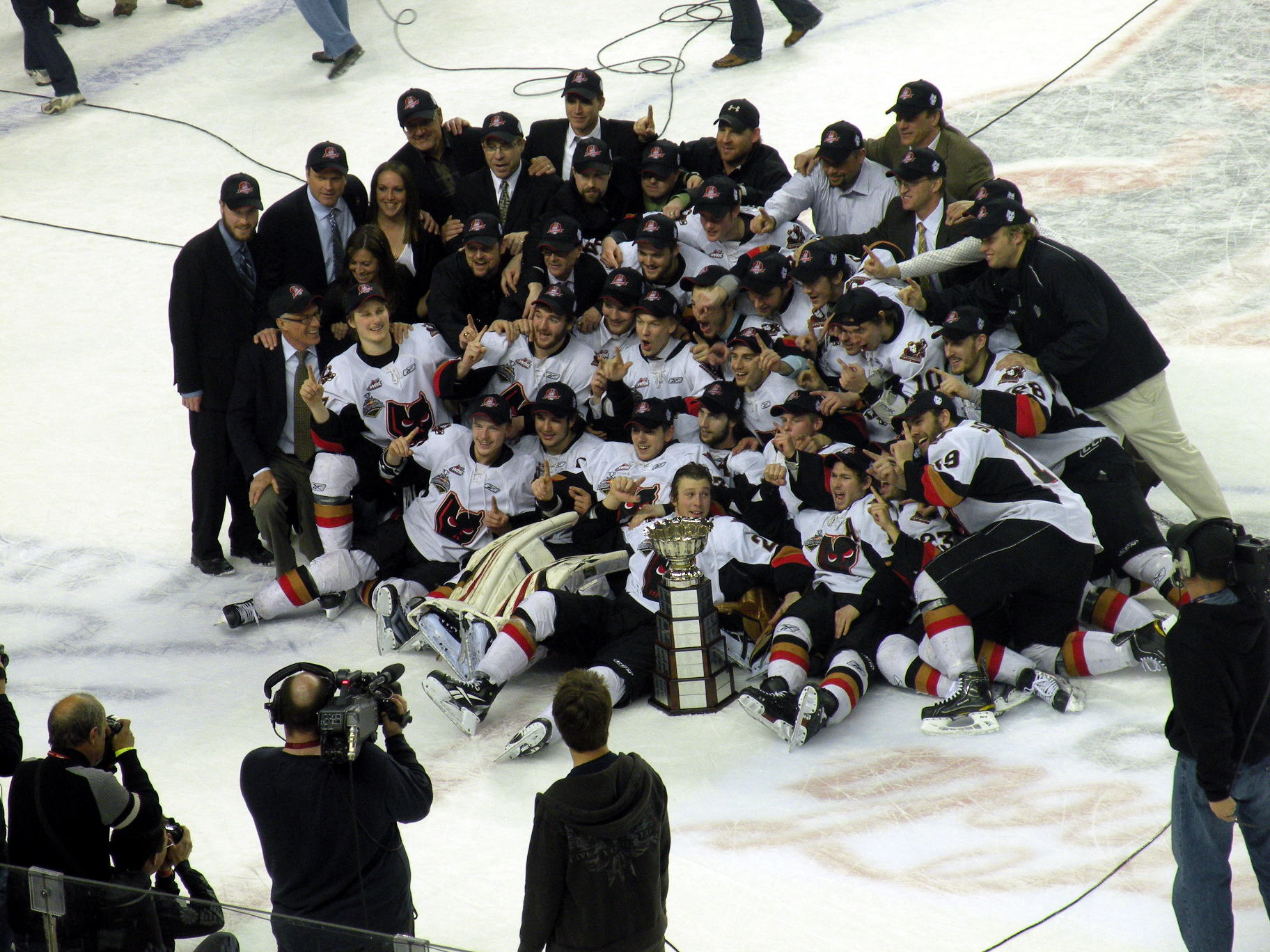
The team celebrates its 2010 title.

Following the graduation of several players, including Karl Alzner, who was named both WHL player of the year and CHL defenceman of the year, the 2008–09 Hitmen were expected to enter a rebuilding period. Instead, they captured the franchise's third Scotty Munro Trophy as the regular season champions, earning the top seed in the playoffs. The team tied or broke 21 franchise records during the regular season, including wins (59), points (122) and goals scored (330). Joel Broda led the league with 53 goals, while Brandon Kozun and Brett Sonne finished second and third in league scoring with 108 and 100 points, respectively; it was only the second time in franchise history that two players topped the 100-point mark in the same season. In the playoffs, the Hitmen won 12 straight games, sweeping the Edmonton Oil Kings, Lethbridge Hurricanes, and Brandon Wheat Kings to reach the WHL finals for the first time since 1999. In the finals, they were stunned by the Kelowna Rockets, losing the first three games of the series before winning the next two to extend the series to a sixth game. The Hitmen lost game six in overtime, and the series 4–2, to end their season. Sonne was named WHL Player of the Year, while General Manager Kelly Kisio was named Executive of the Year for the second time in recognition of the Hitmen's season.

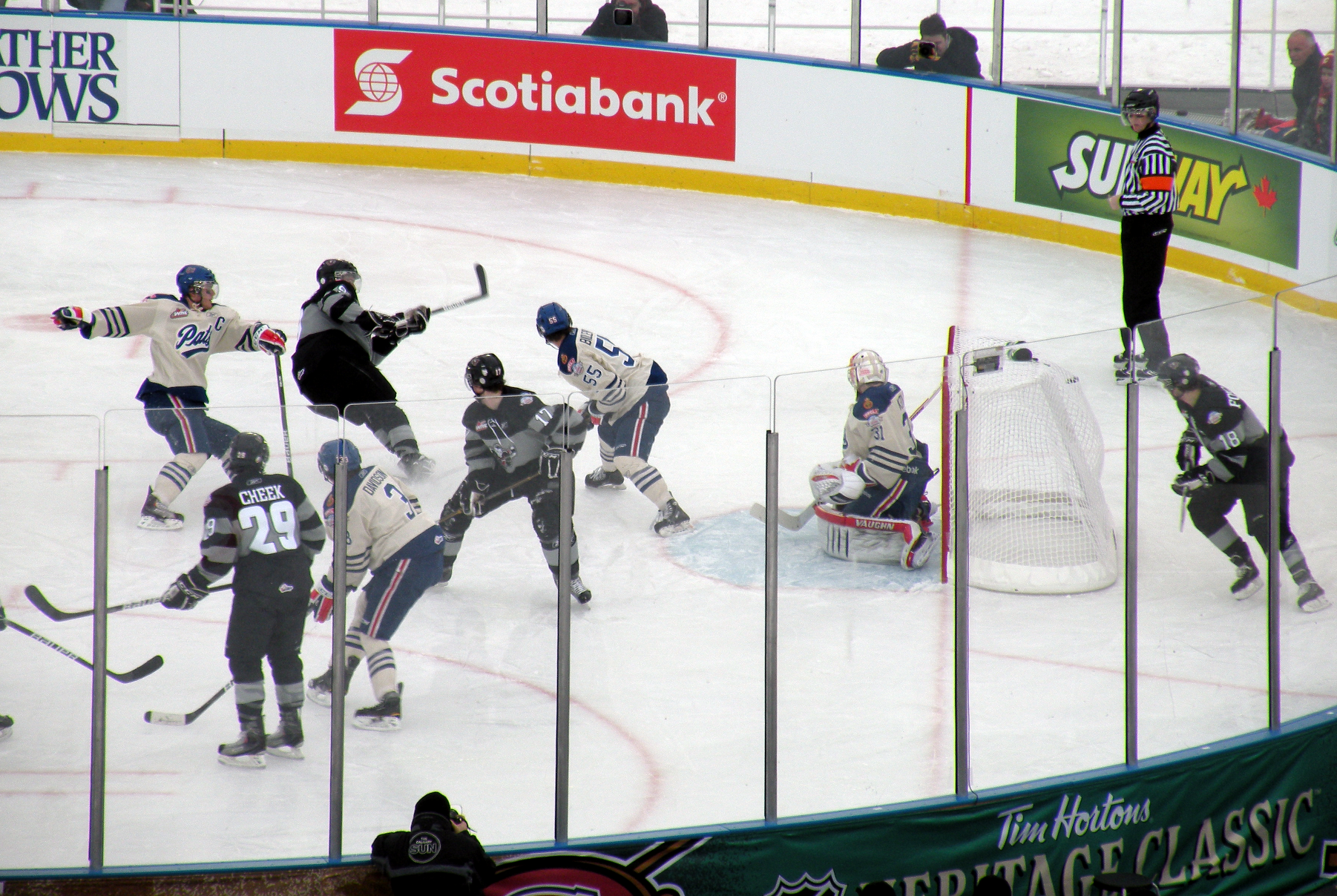
Jaynen Rissling scored Calgary's first goal in the Hitmen's outdoor game; the Regina Pats ultimately won 3–2.

The following season, Calgary again finished with the best record in the regular season with 107 points on the strength of Kozun's CHL-leading 107 points and the goaltending of Martin Jones, who was named goaltender of the year in the WHL. The Hitmen's playoffs nearly ended quickly as they lost three of the first four games in their opening round playoff series against the Warriors before winning three consecutive games to take the series in seven. They then beat the Tigers and Wheat Kings in six and five games respectively to reach the WHL championship series for the second consecutive year. Entering the final against the Tri-City Americans, the 11 players who returned from the 2009 finals loss vowed not to suffer a repeat of their disappointing finish to the previous season. Named the playoff MVP, Jones allowed only seven goals against in the final as the Hitmen defeated the Americans in five games to win their second Ed Chynoweth Cup in franchise history. The victory, in front of a home crowd of over 15,000 fans, earned the Hitmen a berth in the 2010 Memorial Cup tournament. At the tournament, Calgary posted a 2–1 record in the round robin, defeating the QMJHL's Moncton Wildcats and the host Brandon Wheat Kings, but lost the semi-final in overtime, also against Brandon.

Following the graduation of many of the team's top scorers, the Hitmen fell to last place the WHL in 2010–11, at one point tying a franchise record with 12 consecutive losses. As part of the 2011 Heritage Classic, hosted by the Flames, the Hitmen hosted the Regina Pats in an outdoor game at McMahon Stadium on February 21, 2011. Regina won 3–2 before 20,888 fans, setting new WHL and CHL attendance records.

In 2019, the Hitmen hosted the Corral Series, a three-game series paying tribute to former teams that used to play in the Corral.

== Logo and jerseys ==
The original logo of the Hitmen (left) and the alternate they chose to use in their first season (right) after the original was deemed controversial

The club selected its name and logo as an homage to Bret "Hitman" Hart, and the team's original pink, grey, and black jerseys were modelled after Hart's ring attire. The logo proved popular and Hitmen merchandise sold well. However, the name and logo were subject to criticism from segments of the public and the business community, who panned both as negative stereotypes of violence within the sport. Among the chief critics of the new logo was the Flames organization, who received calls from concerned business people who shared that sentiment. Struggling to attract corporate sponsors, the Hitmen chose to scrap the "Jason Voorhees"-style logo in favour of an alternate "starburst" logo just two months after it was unveiled. The club went back to the original logo in 1996.

When the Calgary Flames purchased the team in 1997, they adopted a new colour scheme and updated the logo.

== Community impact ==
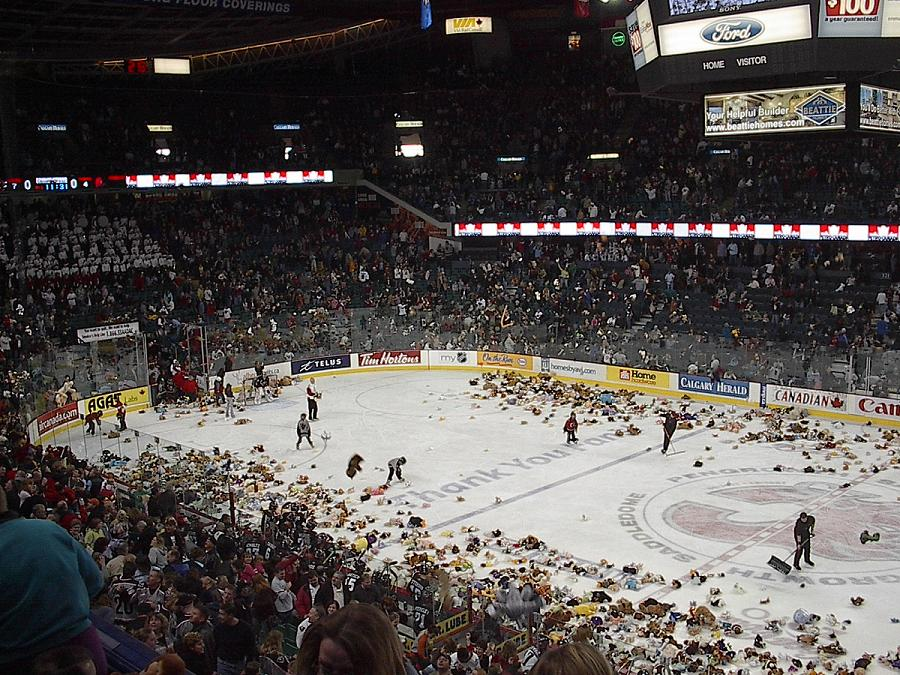
2005 teddy bear toss at the Saddledome

The Hitmen support numerous programs and charities. They host an annual teddy bear toss in December. The 13th annual Petro Canada Teddy Bear Toss, held on December 2, 2007, saw what the Hitmen claim a world record 26,919 bears tossed on to the ice by 17,341 fans. The bears are donated to charities throughout the Calgary area. A few of the bears are personally delivered by the players to the Alberta Children's Hospital, an event highly anticipated by patients at the hospital.

The Hitmen are also partners with the Calgary Board of Education and their Read On! Literacy for Life program. Red Deer, Alberta author Sigmund Brouwer has released numerous young adult-oriented mystery novels about the team and fictitious Hitmen players. The ninth book in the series, titled Hitmen Star, was published in 2008. Copies of the books are distributed to sixth grade students throughout Calgary and southern Alberta schools; with Hitmen and former National Hockey League players helping to encourage students to take an active interest in reading.

== Season-by-season record ==
Note: GP = Games played, W = Wins, L = Losses, T = Ties, OTL = Overtime losses, SOL = Shootout losses, Pts = Points, GF = Goals for, GA = Goals against

Season	GP	W	L	T	OTL	GF	GA	Points	Finish	Playoffs
1995–96	72	18	51	3	–	222	359	39	5th Central	Did not qualify
1996–97	72	15	53	4	–	199	360	34	4th Central	Did not qualify
1997–98	72	40	28	4	–	265	232	84	1st Central	Lost Eastern Conference final
1998–99	72	51	13	8	–	319	187	110	1st Central	Won Championship; Lost Memorial Cup final
1999–2000	72	58	10	2	2	313	182	120	1st Central	Lost Eastern Conference final
2000–01	72	37	27	5	3	284	250	82	3rd Central	Lost Eastern Conference semifinal
2001–02	72	33	33	5	1	271	281	72	3rd Central	Lost Eastern Conference quarterfinal
2002–03	72	27	36	7	2	240	260	63	4th Central	Lost Eastern Conference quarterfinal
2003–04	72	34	24	8	6	220	187	82	3rd Central	Lost Eastern Conference quarterfinal
2004–05	72	34	23	9	6	200	183	83	3rd Central	Lost Eastern Conference semifinal
Season	GP	W	L	OTL	SOL	GF	GA	Points	Finish	Playoffs
2005–06	72	47	18	3	4	195	155	101	2nd Central	Lost Eastern Conference semifinal
2006–07	72	39	26	3	4	251	205	85	3rd Central	Lost Eastern Conference final
2007–08	72	47	20	1	4	259	166	99	1st Central	Lost Eastern Conference final
2008–09	72	59	9	3	1	330	159	122	1st Central	Lost Final
2009–10	72	52	17	1	2	269	177	107	1st Central	Won Championship; Lost Memorial Cup semifinal
2010–11	72	20	47	3	2	171	271	45	6th Central	Did not qualify
2011–12	72	44	27	2	1	273	221	91	2nd Central	Lost Eastern Conference quarterfinal
2012–13	72	46	21	1	4	266	204	97	2nd Central	Lost Eastern Conference final
2013–14	72	48	17	3	4	287	207	103	2nd Central	Lost Eastern Conference quarterfinal
2014–15	72	45	22	1	4	289	203	95	1st Central	Lost Eastern Conference final
2015–16	72	42	26	2	2	246	219	88	3rd Central	Lost Eastern Conference quarterfinal
2016–17	72	30	32	8	2	215	282	70	4th Central	Lost Eastern Conference quarterfinal
2017–18	72	24	37	9	2	226	276	59	5th Central	Did not qualify
2018–19	68	36	26	5	1	255	240	78	3rd Central	Lost Eastern Conference semifinal
2019–20	64	35	24	4	1	219	201	75	4th Central	Cancelled due to the COVID-19 pandemic
2020–21	21	10	8	3	0	72	79	23	3rd Central	No playoffs due to the COVID-19 pandemic
2021–22	68	25	34	7	2	183	229	59	5th Central	Did not qualify
2022–23	68	31	29	3	1	220	224	70	3rd Central	Lost Eastern Conference quarterfinal
2023–24	68	28	31	8	1	250	255	65	5th Central	Did not qualify
2024–25	68	45	17	3	3	266	183	96	2nd Central	Lost Eastern Conference semifinal
2025–26	68	38	21	8	1	248	221	85	3rd Central	Lost Eastern Conference semifinal

== Championship history ==
- Ed Chynoweth Cup(2): 1998–99, 2009–10
- Scotty Munro Memorial Trophy (4): 1998–99, 1999–00, 2008–09, 2009–10
- Conference championships (3): 1998–99, 2008–09, 2009–10
- Division titles (7): 1997–98, 1998–99, 1999–00, 2007–08, 2008–09, 2009–10, 2014–15

=== WHL Championship finals ===
- 1998–99: Win, 4–1 vs Kamloops Blazers
- 2008–09: Loss, 2–4 vs Kelowna Rockets
- 2009–10: Win, 4–1 vs Tri-City Americans

=== Memorial Cup finals ===
- 1999: Loss, 6–7 (OT) vs Ottawa 67's

== NHL alumni ==
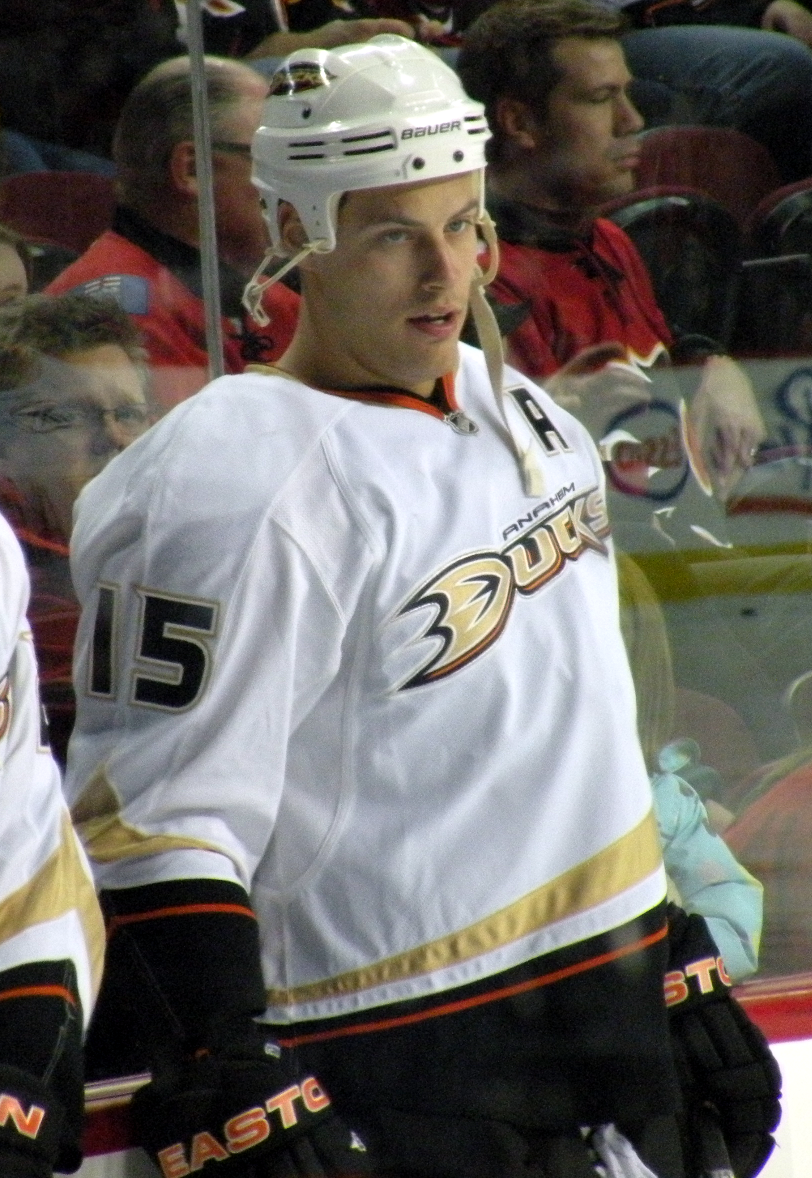
Ryan Getzlaf played four seasons with the Hitmen between 2001 and 2005.

Thirty-eight players have been selected from the Hitmen roster at the National Hockey League's entry draft, including nine players selected in the first round. The highest drafted players in club history were Pavel Brendl (1999) and Andrew Ladd (2004)—both players were selected fourth overall.

Forty-four former Hitmen players have gone on to play in the National Hockey League, as of 2012. The first was Ryan Bast, who played two games with the Philadelphia Flyers in 1998–99. Andrew Ladd has gone on to win two Stanley Cup championships, with the Carolina Hurricanes in 2006 and the Chicago Blackhawks in 2010. His former Hitmen teammate, Ryan Getzlaf, won the Cup with the Anaheim Ducks in 2007, and Johnny Boychuk has one as a member of the 2011 Boston Bruins.

=== List of NHL alumni ===
- Karl Alzner
- Ryan Bast
- Jake Bean
- Kris Beech
- Johnny Boychuk
- Pavel Brendl
- Barry Brust
- Brett Carson
- Brodie Dupont
- Chris Driedger
- Justin Falk
- Kris Foucault
- Owen Fussey
- T. J. Galiardi
- Ryan Getzlaf
- Darcy Hordichuk
- Martin Jones
- Mark Kastelic
- Ben Kindel
- Dustin Kohn
- Brandon Kozun
- Brent Krahn
- Jordan Krestanovich
- Andrew Ladd
- Beck Malenstyn
- Carson McMillan
- Brad Moran
- Chris Nielsen
- Tristen Nielsen
- Stephen Peat
- Matt Pettinger
- Alex Plante
- Justin Pogge
- Paul Postma
- Konstantin Pushkarev
- Victor Rask
- Travis Sanheim
- Brandon Segal
- Jeff Schultz
- Ray Schultz
- Fredrik Sjostrom
- Jerred Smithson
- Rastislav Stana
- Michael Stone
- Brad Stuart
- Ryan Tobler
- Carsen Twarynski
- Jake Virtanen
- Ryan White
- Egor Zamula

== Head coaches ==
Dean Clark coached the team between 1996 and 2001, winning more games than any other WHL coach. He was named coach of the year in both the WHL and CHL in 1998. He led the Hitmen to three division titles, two regular season titles, one league championship, and coached the Hitmen to their first Memorial Cup final.

Kelly Kisio was head coach from the 2004–05 season to the end of the 2007–08 season, a role he shared with Dean Evason in his first year with the Hitmen. Kisio stepped down as coach in 2008, naming former assistant Dave Lowry as head coach for the 2008–09 season.

Lowry was promoted to an assistant with the Calgary Flames after leading the Hitmen to a 122-point season in his first year. He was replaced by Mike Williamson, who led the team to a WHL championship in 2010 before leaving the team in 2014. He was followed by Mark French, Dallas Ferguson, and Steve Hamilton.

In 2024, the team hired Paul McFarland who spent the three previous seasons as assistant coach of the Seattle Kraken.

#	Name	Dates	Notes
1	Graham James	1995–1996	Resigned prior to 1996–97 season
2	Jim Currie	1996	Interim head coach
3	Dean Clark	1996–2001	1998 WHL, CHL Coach of the Year
4	Richard Kromm	2001–2004	
5	Dean Evason	2004–2005	Co-coach with Kelly Kisio
6	Kelly Kisio	2004–2008	
7	Dave Lowry	2008–2009	
8	Mike Williamson	2009–2014	
9	Mark French	2014–2017	
10	Dallas Ferguson	2017–2018	
11	Steve Hamilton	2018–2024	
12	Paul McFarland	2024–present	

== Team records ==
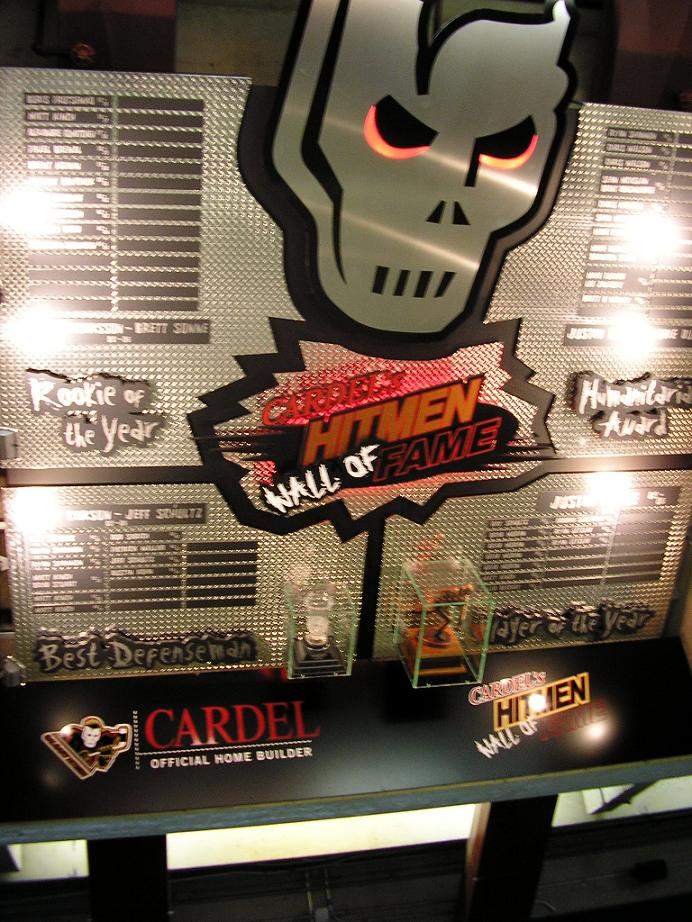
Hitmen "Wall of Fame", hanging above section 104 at the Saddledome.

Team records for a single season
Statistic	Total	Season
Most points	122	2008–09
Most wins	59	2008–09
Fewest points	34	1996–97
Fewest wins	15	1996–97
Most goals for	330	2008–09
Fewest goals for	171	2010–11
Fewest goals against	155	2005–06
Most goals against	282	2016–17

Individual player records for a single season
Statistic	Player	Total	Season
Most goals	Pavel Brendl	73	1998–99
Most assists	Brad Moran	72	1999–2000
Most points	Pavel Brendl	134	1998–99
Most penalty minutes	Ryan Andres	302	1997–98
Most saves (goalie)	Alexandre Fomitchev	1,481	1997–98
Best GAA (goalie)	Justin Pogge	1.72	2005–06
Goalies = minimum 1500 minutes played

Career records
Statistic	Player	Total	Career
Most goals	Brad Moran	204	1995–2000
Most assists	Brad Moran	246	1995–2000
Most points	Brad Moran	450	1995–2000
Most penalty minutes	Mike Egener	704	2000–2004
Most games played	Brad Moran	357	1995–2000
Most games (goalie)	Dan Spence	179	2004–2008
Most shutouts (goalie)	Martin Jones	16	2006–2010

== Awards and honours ==
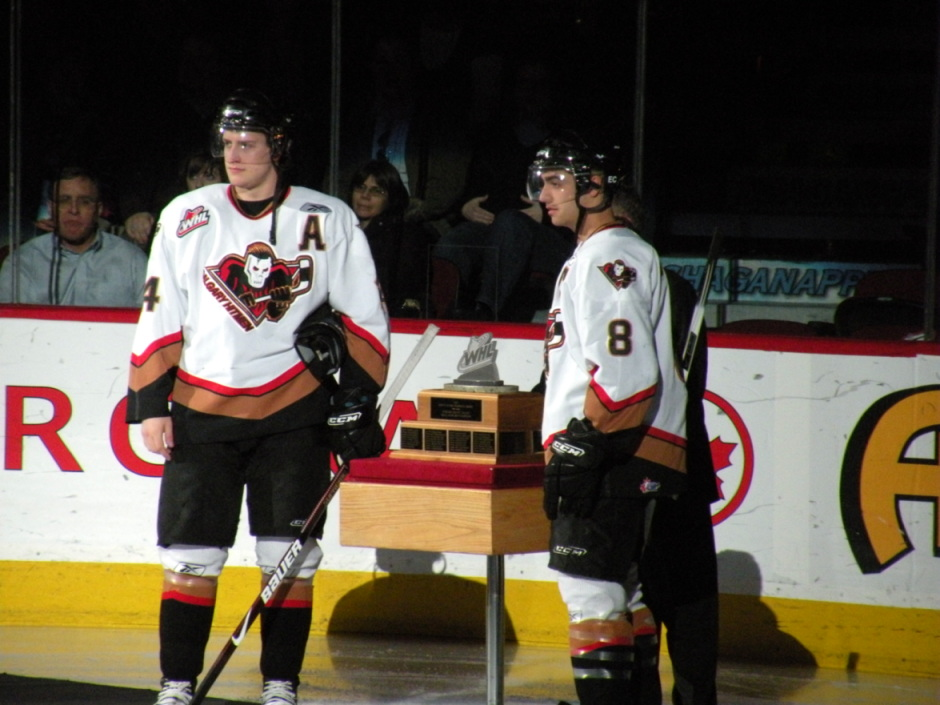
Carson McMillan and Kyle Bortis accept the Scotty Munro Memorial Trophy as the 2008–09 regular season champions.

The Calgary Hitmen have captured numerous awards during the franchise's tenure. Hitmen players have been named the WHL's most outstanding player four times. Defenceman Karl Alzner won the Four Broncos Memorial Trophy in 2007–08—he was also named the defenceman of the year—and Brett Sonne won the trophy in 2008–09. Goaltender Martin Jones captured numerous awards in Calgary's championship season of 2009–10, including being named the top goaltender at the Memorial Cup, while Brandon Kozun led the entire Canadian Hockey League in scoring.

Brad Moran, the franchise's all-time leading scorer, had his number 20 retired in 2005, the first player to be so honoured. Following the lead of the Calgary Flames, the team introduced a new program in 2015 to honour former players. Called "Forever a Hitmen", the team named Ryan Getzlaf the first inductee in 2015.

=== List of award recipients ===
Four Broncos Memorial Trophy
Player of the year

- Brad Moran: 1999–2000
- Justin Pogge: 2005–06
- Karl Alzner: 2007–08
- Brett Sonne: 2008–09

Bob Clarke Trophy
Top scorer

- Pavel Brendl: 1998–99
- Brad Moran: 1999–2000
- Brandon Kozun: 2009–10

Doc Seaman Trophy
Scholastic player of the year

- Chris Nielsen: 1998–99, 1999–2000

Brad Hornung Trophy
Most sportsmanlike player

- Matt Kinch: 1998–99, 2000–01

Bill Hunter Memorial Trophy
Defenceman of the year

- Brad Stuart: 1998–99
- Karl Alzner: 2007–08

CHL Defenceman of the Year

- Brad Stuart: 1998–99
- Karl Alzner: 2007–08

Jim Piggott Memorial Trophy
Rookie of the year

- Pavel Brendl: 1998–99

CHL Top Draft Prospect Award

- Pavel Brendl: 1998–99

Del Wilson Trophy
Goaltender of the year

- Justin Pogge: 2005–06
- Martin Jones: 2009–10

CHL Goaltender of the Year

- Justin Pogge: 2005–06

Hap Emms Memorial Trophy
Top goaltender at the Memorial Cup

- Martin Jones: 2010

Dunc McCallum Memorial Trophy
Coach of the year

- Dean Clark: 1997–98

Brian Kilrea Coach of the Year Award
CHL coach of the year

- Dean Clark: 1997–98

Lloyd Saunders Memorial Trophy
Executive of the year

- Kelly Kisio: 2003–04, 2008–09

Doug Wickenheiser Memorial Trophy
Humanitarian of the year

- Chris Nielsen: 1999–2000
- Cody Sylvester: 2012–13

WHL Playoff MVP

- Brad Moran: 1999
- Martin Jones: 2010

WHL Plus-Minus Award
Top plus-minus

- Pavel Brendl: 1998–99
- Kenton Smith: 1999–2000
- Andrew Ladd: 2003–04
- Clark Smith: 2004-05
- Paul Postma: 2008–09

St. Clair Group Trophy
Top marketing/public relations department

- Mark Stiles: 2003–04
- Kip Reghenas: 2007–08

== See also ==
- List of ice hockey teams in Alberta
- Ice hockey in Calgary
