= Brad Lauer =

Canadian ice hockey player (born 1966)

- Born: October 27, 1966 (age 59) Humboldt, Saskatchewan, Canada
- Height: 6 ft 0 in (183 cm)
- Weight: 210 lb (95 kg; 15 st 0 lb)
- Position: Left wing
- Shot: Left
- Played for: New York Islanders; Chicago Blackhawks; Ottawa Senators; Pittsburgh Penguins
- NHL draft: 34th overall, 1985; New York Islanders
- Playing career: 1986–2002

Bradley Richard Lauer (born October 27, 1966) is a Canadian ice hockey coach and former professional ice hockey player. He is currently the head coach of the Spokane Chiefs of the Western Hockey League (WHL). He is a former associate coach of the Winnipeg Jets of the National Hockey League (NHL). Lauer previously served as the head coach of the Edmonton Oil Kings of the WHL. Lauer was drafted 34th overall in the 1985 NHL entry draft by the New York Islanders and played in the NHL for the Islanders, Chicago Blackhawks, Ottawa Senators, and Pittsburgh Penguins between 1986 and 1996.

== Early life ==
Born and raised in Humboldt, Saskatchewan, Lauer played minor hockey in Swift Current alongside Wendel Clark, and with the Humboldt Broncos in Saskatchewan.

== Career ==
=== Amateur ===
Lauer graduated to the Regina Pats of the Western Hockey League (WHL) ahead of the 1983–84 season. In the second half of the season, Lauer took on a penalty killing role for the Pats. In 60 games with Regina, Lauer scored five goals and seven assists for 12 points. The Pats qualified for the playoffs but Lauer missed time with a broken knuckle suffered in a game on March 7, 1984. He returned to the lineup on April 13, but the Pats ultimately fell to the Kamloops Junior Oilers in the WHL finals. In 16 playoff games, Lauer added one assist. He returned to the Pats for the 1984–85 season and was placed on a line with Brent Fedyk and Allan Acton. The line was matched against opposing team's top scoring lines. By December, Lauer was on a line with Acton and Doug Trapp. In 72 games with Regina, he tallied 33 goals and 79 points. The Pats once again made the playoffs, but were knocked out by the Medicine Hat Tigers. In eight playoff games, Lauer registered six goals and 12 points.

For the 1985–86 season, Lauer missed time early with a shoulder injury, and later in November, with a broken knuckle. Lauer was invited to attend Team Canada's training camp ahead of the 1986 World Junior Championships in December 1985. However, he was not among those selected to play in the tournament for Canada. He was instead selected to play in the WHL Eastern Division all-star game in January 1986. With the Pats missing defencemen, Lauer played the final six games of the regular season on defence. In 57 games with Regina, he recorded 36 goals and 74 points. The Pats qualified for the playoffs and entered the round-robin portion of the playoffs, in which they were eliminated. In ten playoff games, Lauer tallied four goals and nine points.

=== Professional ===
==== New York Islanders ====
Lauer was selected by the New York Islanders of the National Hockey League (NHL), who took him in the second round with the 34th selection of the 1985 NHL entry draft. He was projected as a scoring threat and was considered part of the Islanders "best draft in years." He attended the Islanders 1985 training camp, but was returned to Regina on September 30, 1985. He signed a three-year contract plus an option year with New York in April 1986. He made the Islanders team out of training camp ahead of the 1986–87 season and made his NHL debut on October 9, 1986, against the Chicago Blackhawks on a line with Brent Sutter and Mike Bossy. He scored his first NHL goal in his second game, scoring on the power play against goaltender Bob Janecyk in a 5–4 loss to the Los Angeles Kings on October 11. Patrick Flatley later replaced Bossy on Sutter and Lauer's line. Lauer tallied seven goals and 21 points in 61 games with the Islanders. New York finished third in the Patrick Division and qualified for the playoffs. They faced the Washington Capitals in the opening round best-of-seven series. Lauer was a healthy scratch for the team's opening game, but made his NHL playoff debut on April 9, replacing Greg Gilbert in the lineup in a 3–1 victory over the Capitals. He played on the fourth line alongside Bob Bassen and Duane Sutter. Lauer scored his first playoff goal in the following game on April 12, marking the team's only goal against Bob Mason in a 4–1 loss. The Islanders advanced, winning the series, though Lauer missed the final game, and the first two of the next series against the Philadelphia Flyers with a bruised hip. In his return to the lineup on April 24, he played on the fourth line with Brent Sutter and Patrick Flatley. He appeared in one more game before missing the rest of the series with a thigh injury as the Flyers eliminated the Islanders. In six playoff games, Lauer added two goals.

Going into the 1987–88 season, Lauer was among the Islanders' young players that was looked upon to complement the ageing core from the team's dynasty in the earlier part of the decade. However, in training camp, Lauer suffered a fractured right hand that kept him from participating in drills and as a result was a healthy scratch for the first four games of the season. In his first game in the lineup, he was placed on the left wing alongside Brent Sutter and Patrick Flatley and assisted on Sutter's goal in a 5–4 win over the Calgary Flames on October 20. After getting into the lineup, his play was deemed "excellent through the early part of the season". However, in a 5–2 loss to the Toronto Maple Leafs on October 28, Lauer was one of three players along with Mikko Mäkelä and Gerald Diduck who head coach Terry Simpson told to stay in the locker room after the second intermission, with the coach stating that the three players were not fulfilling his expectations. The incident became a major story amongst New York media, with the various outlets dividing the season's performance pre and post benching. In the middle of the season, Lauer went on an eight-game goal scoring drought, broken on January 5, 1988, in a 3–3 tie with the Minnesota North Stars. He had a multi-goal game, tallying two goals, in a 4–2 victory over the Washington Capitals on February 5. In 69 games with New York, he recorded a career-high 17 goals and 35 points. The Islanders won the Patrick Division and faced the New Jersey Devils in the first round of the playoffs. Lauer began the playoffs on the team's second line alongside Brent Sutter and Dale Henry. However, he once again found himself scratched from the lineup, replaced by Mick Vukota for Game 3 of the series. He returned to the lineup, replacing Vukota, for Game 4 and played the remainder of the series. In Game 7, with the Islanders facing elimination, Lauer recorded a three-point game, scoring two goals and assisting on Steve Konroyd's goal in a 6–5 loss to the Devils, ending their season. In five playoff games, he contributed three goals and four points.

Lauer opened the 1988–89 season on the second line with Brent Sutter and David Volek. However, shortly after the season began, Lauer's nose was broken by Mick Vukota in practice. Volek was replaced by Alan Kerr, but the line struggled and then Lauer suffered a significant injury after taking a Mark Howe shot above the knee in a game against the Philadelphia Flyers on October 27. He suffered a fractured left kneecap from the shot and returned only in January 1989, being assigned to the Islanders' American Hockey League (AHL) affiliate, the Springfield Indians, on a conditioning loan. Lauer was recalled after three games in which he had a goal and four points with Springfield and made his NHL return on January 30. However, after five games, he felt some recurring issues with his leg and was scratched from the lineup. On February 15, he was assigned to Springfield, but his knee injury failed to heal and he remained out of the lineup indefinitely. He finished the season with three goals and five points in 14 games with the Islanders and one goal and six points in eight games with the Indians.

In August, Lauer re-signed with the Islanders to a two-year contract. Coming off his knee injury, and plagued by back spasms in training camp, he was assigned to Springfield to start the 1989–90 season. He was recalled by New York on October 20 after injuries to Brent Sutter and Dave Chyzowski, and made his NHL season debut on October 21 in a 2–1 loss to the Vancouver Canucks. He missed time in January 1990 with a strained medial collateral ligament in his right knee, and in March with a bruised right quadriceps muscle. He developed into a defensive forward in the season and finished it with four goals and six points in seven games in the AHL and six goals and 24 points in 63 games in the NHL. The Islanders just made the playoffs, beating out the Pittsburgh Penguins for the final spot to face their cross-town rivals, the New York Rangers in the opening round. Lauer did not play the first game of the series, but after Vukota and Ken Baumgartner were suspended, Lauer took their place in the lineup along with Rod Dallman for Game 2. The Rangers eliminated the Islanders in five games and Lauer had two assists in four games.

Lauer made the Islanders out of training camp as one of the extra forwards for the 1990–91 season. However, he soon found himself scratched by coach Al Arbour for multiple games and was assigned to New York's new AHL affiliate, the Capital District Islanders, on October 25. While playing for Capital District, he was struck in the right eye by an errant stick and suffered a torn cornea. He required laser eye surgery to repair the damage. He was recalled by New York on November 21. In December he missed four games with a leg injury described as both a pulled groin and a leg infection. On March 30, 1991, Lauer assisted on two goals each by Hubie McDonough and Tom Fitzgerald for four points in a 5–3 win over the Boston Bruins. He finished the season with five goals and 16 points in 11 games with Capital District and four goals and 12 points in 44 games with New York.

The NHL expanded in the 1991 offseason, adding the San Jose Sharks franchise. Lauer was left unprotected by the Islanders in the expansion draft, but went unselected. During training camp, he was struck by a puck below his right eyebrow and was taken to the hospital. Since it was the same eye that he had previously been struck in, he required medical clearance to return to the ice. He began the 1991–92 season with New York and appeared in eight games, scoring one goal.

==== Chicago Blackhawks ====
Lauer was traded along with Brent Sutter to the Chicago Blackhawks for centre Adam Creighton and left wing Steve Thomas on October 25, 1991. He made his Blackhawks debut on October 26 in a 4–2 victory over the Hartford Whalers, going scoreless. However, by the end of November he had been assigned to Chicago's International Hockey League (IHL) affiliate, the Indianapolis Ice. He was briefly recalled by Chicago in January 1992, but did not play, and was returned to Indianapolis after one game. He was recalled again at the end of the month and got into games, but head coach Mike Keenan kept his use limited and he was sent back to the IHL on February 7. He finished the season with 24 goals and 54 points in 57 games in the IHL. He made six regular season appearances for Chicago, going scoreless. He was recalled by Chicago again on April 14, ahead of the playoffs. He made his Blackhawks' playoff debut on April 24 in their Game 4 5–3 victory over the St. Louis Blues. In Game 5 of the series, he had his first playoff goal and assist with the Blackhawks in a 6–4 victory on April 26. The Blackhawks advanced to the 1992 Stanley Cup Final against the Pittsburgh Penguins, but ultimately lost the series. In seven playoff games, Lauer registered one goal and two points.

The league expanded again in mid 1992, adding the Ottawa Senators and Tampa Bay Lightning franchises. Lauer was left unprotected by the Blackhawks in the 1992 NHL expansion draft, but was not selected by either team. He was assigned to Indianapolis to begin the 1992–93 season and was named team captain. In a game on October 30 against the Cincinnati Cyclones, Lauer got into a heated argument with one of the referees over a penalty to the Ice. The referee ejected him from the game. Lauer then went at the referee with his stick, but did not connect. He then broke his stick over the glass surrounding the ice. As a result, Lauer was suspended by the league for one game. He was recalled by Chicago on December 30 and made his NHL season debut on December 31 in a 5–0 win over the Tampa Bay Lightning. He appeared in seven games with Chicago, registering one assist, before being returned to Indianapolis at the beginning of February 1993. However, shortly after returning, Lauer missed time with an injured leg. It was his most successful season of professional hockey as Lauer notched 50 goals and 41 assists for 91 points in 62 games played with Indianapolis, leading the league in goals. He was named to the IHL First All-Star Team alongside teammate Tony Hrkac in April. The Ice made the Turner Cup playoffs and faced the Atlanta Knights in the first round. However, their playoff run was brief as they were eliminated by the Knights in five games. In the series, Lauer added three goals and four points.

==== Ottawa Senators ====
The league expanded again in 1993, adding the Anaheim Mighty Ducks and Florida Panthers franchises. Lauer was once again left unprotected by the Blackhawks for the 1993 NHL expansion draft, but was not selected by either expansion team. In July, Lauer signed a contract with the Las Vegas Thunder of the IHL, and was released by the Blackhawks. He was invited to the Ottawa Senators' 1993 training camp on a professional tryout (PTO) contract. He was released from his PTO on September 23 and returned to Las Vegas. He made 30 appearances with Las Vegas, recording 21 goals and 42 points before was signed by Ottawa to a one-year contract after a series of injuries swept through the team, depleting the team's forward depth. He made his Senators' debut on January 3, 1994, in a 4–1 loss to the Pittsburgh Penguins. Lauer scored his first goal as a Senator, registering the only Ottawa goal in the game. While with Ottawa, Lauer was selected to play in the IHL All-Star Game representing the Western Conference. Lauer ended up on the Senators' top line alongside Alexei Yashin and Evgeny Davydov. Despite being an offensive star in the IHL, Lauer saw his use by Ottawa head coach Rick Bowness as more defensive. By March, Lauer was on the third line with Scott Levins and Troy Mallette. On March 13, Lauer suffered a hip flexor injury, that kept him out of the lineup. On March 18, Lauer was placed on waivers in order to be sent back to Las Vegas after injured Senators Darcy Loewen and Dave Archibald returned to the lineup and free agent Dan Quinn was signed. After the NHL trade deadline on March 22, at which the Senators acquired a number of players, Lauer was returned to Las Vegas. However, he refused to report to Las Vegas and was suspended by the team. However, he signed a new contract with Las Vegas for the remainder of the season in April. He finished the season having appeared in 30 games with the Senators recording two goals and seven points and 32 games with Las Vegas, tallying 21 goals and 42 points. The Thunder advanced to the playoffs and faced the San Diego Gulls in the opening round. They were eliminated by the Gulls in five games. In four playoff games, Lauer marked one goal.

==== Pittsburgh Penguins ====
As a free agent from the Senators, he signed a contract with the Pittsburgh Penguins in September. By September 11, his rights were acquired by the Cleveland Lumberjacks of the IHL from the Penguins. On September 20, he was assigned to Cleveland for the 1994–95 season. In November he suffered a separated right shoulder and then in February 1995, injuries to his ankle and leg. He finished the season with 32 goals and 59 points in 51 games with Cleveland. The Lumberjacks qualified for the playoffs but were knocked out in the first round by the Cincinnati Cyclones. In four playoff games, he scored four goals and six points.

Lauer attended Penguins training camp, but was returned to Cleveland for the 1995–96 season. He was made available in the waiver draft, but was not selected. He played on the team's top line alongside Len Barrie, Domenic Pittis, and Dave Michayluk. In February 1996 he suffered a groin injury. He was recalled by Pittsburgh on February 28 and made his NHL season debut on February 29 in a 7–2 loss to the Calgary Flames. Lauer played on a line with Mario Lemieux and Ed Patterson in his debut. In his second appearance with the Penguins on March 1, he recorded a three-point game, scoring his first two goals with Pittsburgh and assisting on another by Jaromír Jágr in a 5–4 victory over the Edmonton Oilers. He finished the season with the Penguins, appearing in 21 games, registering four goals and five points. In 53 games with Cleveland, he tallied 25 goals and 52 points. The Penguins made the playoffs and faced the Washington Capitals. Playing on a line with Lemieux and Tomas Sandström, Lauer made his Pittsburgh playoff debut on April 17 against the Washington Capitals, registering his first playoff point assisting on Sandström's second period goal. However, he was moved off Lemieux's line for the following games, playing alongside Glen Murray and Bryan Smolinski on the third line. The Penguins advanced to the Eastern Conference Finals against the Florida Panthers. The Panthers eliminated the Penguins in seven games. In 12 playoff games, Lauer added one goal and two points.

Ahead of the 1996–97 season, Lauer was made available in the waiver draft, but was not claimed. He was assigned to Cleveland to start the season. He often played alongside Jan Hrdina, with Mark Osborne, Petr Klíma, or Lane Lambert as the third member of the line. In January 1997, Lauer suffered a hamstring injury that kept him sidelined. He finished the regular season with 27 goals and 48 points in 64 games with the Lumberjacks. Cleveland qualified for the playoffs and advanced to the conference finals against the Detroit Vipers, who eliminated them. In 14 playoff games, Lauer added four goals and ten points while playing on a line with Jeff Christian and Jock Callander. Lauer became a free agent again in the 1997 offseason, however, signed a contract with Cleveland for the 1997–98 season. He was named one of the team's alternate captains, and played on a line with Brett Harkins and Martin St. Louis. In 68 appearances with Cleveland, he scored 22 goals and 55 points. The Lumberjacks made the playoffs and advanced to the Eastern Conference semifinals again, only to be eliminated by the Orlando Solar Bears. In ten playoff games, he recorded three assists.

==== Minor leagues ====
Lauer signed with the Utah Grizzlies of the IHL in August 1998. He played on the team's first line alongside Don Biggs and John Purves. For the 1998–99 season, Lauer made 78 appearances with Utah, scoring 31 goals and 68 points. He returned to the Grizzlies for the 1999–2000 season. In 71 regular season games, he added 26 goal and 48 points. The Grizzlies qualified for the playoffs and earned a first round bye. In the Western Conference semifinals they were eliminated by the Houston Aeros. He recorded one assist in five playoff games. With one year left on his contract with Utah, the team became the IHL affiliate of the NHL's Dallas Stars for the 2000–01 season. Lauer was moved down to the third line and was asked to take on a more defensive role with the team. As a result, his scoring dropped, tallying just 15 goals and 38 points in 73 games. In March 2001 he was temporarily suspended indefinitely after bumping a referee, with the ultimate length dependent on a league investigation. The suspension was later reduced to a single game.

With the merger of the IHL and AHL following the season and a limited number of veteran player slots on AHL teams, Lauer signed with the Sheffield Steelers in the Ice Hockey Superleague as a player-coach in September 2001. Lauer registered 13 goals and 26 points in 47 appearances in the 2001–02 season. The Steelers went on to win the Playoff Championship and in seven playoff games, he added one goal and four points.

== Coaching career ==
Lauer joined the Kootenay Ice of the WHL as an assistant coach for 2002–03 season, joining head coach Cory Clouston's staff replacing Ryan McGill. He resigned from the position in July 2007. At first he was hired to coach the British Columbia Hockey League's Alberni Valley Bulldogs in July 2007, but shortly after thereafter in July he was hired by the Nashville Predators to be the assistant coach of their primary developmental affiliate, the AHL's Milwaukee Admirals, working under former teammate Lane Lambert. He stayed with the team until the 2008–09 season.

Lauer left Milwaukee to rejoin Cory Clouston, who was now the head coach of the Ottawa Senators, as an assistant coach on July 23, 2009. Lauer was the first former Senators' player to serve on the team's coaching staff, but was not offered an extension on his expiring contract on April 9, 2011, after the team finished with the fifth worst record in the NHL that resulted in himself, assistant coach Greg Carvel, and Clouston being let go by the team.

That off-season Lauer signed with the Anaheim Ducks to be an assistant coach with their AHL affiliate, the Syracuse Crunch, for the 2011–12 season. However, early into that season the Anaheim Ducks fired their entire coaching staff (November 30, 2011) and Lauer was promoted to assistant coach of the Anaheim Ducks replacing Dave Farrish and Mike Foligno. where he was joined by Bruce Boudreau and Bob Woods who themselves had recently been released by the Washington Capitals. He was fired by the Ducks on June 9, 2015, after the team was knocked out in the Western Conference final by the Chicago Blackhawks.

He was not out of work for long as on August 18, he was hired as an assistant coach to Jon Cooper with the Tampa Bay Lightning. He remained with the team until he was let go along with fellow assistant coach, Rick Bowness, on May 31, 2018, after the team was eliminated in the Eastern Conference Final by the Washington Capitals.

On June 27, 2018, Lauer was named the head coach of the Edmonton Oil Kings of the WHL. In his first season as head coach in 2018–19 season, the team went 42–18–8 and advanced to the WHL's third round before being eliminated. The next two seasons were shortened by the COVID-19 pandemic. He was awarded the Dunc McCallum Memorial Trophy as the league's best head coach after leading the Oil Kings to a second consecutive Central Division title. In the 2021–22 season, the first to return to a normal schedule, Lauer guided his team to a 50–14–4 record, winning the Ed Chynoweth Cup and advancing to the 2022 Memorial Cup.

On July 21, 2022, Lauer was named an assistant coach of the Winnipeg Jets of the NHL, working under Rick Bowness. While with the Jets he predominately worked with the power play unit. He was fired by the Jets after the team finished 22nd in the league on the power play on May 29, 2024.

On July 18, 2024, Lauer was named head coach of the Spokane Chiefs of the WHL. In his first season with the team in 2024–25, the Chiefs finished with a record of 45–20–1–2 and advanced to the WHL final. In June 2025 he was named an assistant coach for the Canadian junior team for the 2026 World Juniors.

== Personal life ==
Following the paralysis of former teammate Brad Hornung after an on-ice incident in 1987, Lauer was asked by the Regina Pats to be co-chairman of a trust with Bryan Trottier that assisted Hornung and his family.

== Career statistics ==
=== Regular season and playoffs ===
			Regular season					Playoffs
Season	Team	League	GP	G	A	Pts	PIM	GP	G	A	Pts	PIM
1983–84	Regina Pats	WHL	60	5	7	12	51	16	0	1	1	24
1984–85	Regina Pats	WHL	72	33	46	79	57	8	6	6	12	9
1985–86	Regina Pats	WHL	57	36	38	74	69	10	4	5	9	2
1986–87	New York Islanders	NHL	61	7	14	21	65	6	2	0	2	4
1987–88	New York Islanders	NHL	69	17	18	35	67	5	3	1	4	4
1988–89	Springfield Indians	AHL	8	1	5	6	0	—	—	—	—	—
1988–89	New York Islanders	NHL	14	3	2	5	2	—	—	—	—	—
1989–90	Springfield Indians	AHL	7	4	2	6	0	—	—	—	—	—
1989–90	New York Islanders	NHL	63	6	18	24	19	4	0	2	2	10
1990–91	Capital District Islanders	AHL	11	5	11	16	14	—	—	—	—	—
1990–91	New York Islanders	NHL	44	4	8	12	45	—	—	—	—	—
1991–92	Indianapolis Ice	IHL	57	24	30	54	46	—	—	—	—	—
1991–92	New York Islanders	NHL	8	1	0	1	2	—	—	—	—	—
1991–92	Chicago Blackhawks	NHL	6	0	0	0	4	7	1	1	2	2
1992–93	Indianapolis Ice	IHL	62	50	41	91	80	5	3	1	4	6
1992–93	Chicago Blackhawks	NHL	7	0	1	1	2	—	—	—	—	—
1993–94	Ottawa Senators	NHL	30	2	5	7	6	—	—	—	—	—
1993–94	Las Vegas Thunder	IHL	32	21	21	42	30	4	1	0	1	2
1994–95	Cleveland Lumberjacks	IHL	51	32	27	59	48	4	4	2	6	6
1995–96	Pittsburgh Penguins	NHL	21	4	1	5	6	12	1	1	2	4
1995–96	Cleveland Lumberjacks	IHL	53	25	27	52	44	—	—	—	—	—
1996–97	Cleveland Lumberjacks	IHL	64	27	21	48	61	14	4	6	10	8
1997–98	Cleveland Lumberjacks	IHL	68	22	33	55	74	10	0	3	3	12
1998–99	Utah Grizzlies	IHL	78	31	30	61	68	—	—	—	—	—
1999–00	Utah Grizzlies	IHL	71	26	22	48	73	5	0	1	1	2
2000–01	Utah Grizzlies	IHL	73	15	23	38	70	—	—	—	—	—
2001–02	Sheffield Steelers	BISL	47	13	13	26	62	7	1	3	4	6
IHL totals			609	273	275	548	594	42	12	13	25	36
NHL totals			323	44	67	111	218	34	7	5	12	24

== Bibliography ==
- Clark, Wendel; Lang, Jim (2016). Bleeding Blue: Giving My All for the Game. Simon & Schuster. ISBN 978-1-5011-3598-9.
