= Tacoma Rockets =

Ice hockey team

- City: Tacoma, Washington
- League: Western Hockey League
- Operated: 1991–95
- Home arena: Tacoma Dome
- Colors: Teal, Red, Black, White
- Head coach: Marcel Comeau

Franchise history
- 1991–1995: Tacoma Rockets
- 1995-Present: Kelowna Rockets

The Tacoma Rockets were a junior ice hockey team in the Western Hockey League (WHL) from 1991 to 1995. They played at the Tacoma Dome in Tacoma, Washington. The Rockets were granted as an expansion franchise, and were named after the defunct professional team of the same name. After the 1994–95 season, low attendance forced the team to move to Kelowna, British Columbia after only four seasons, where they became the Kelowna Rockets. While the Rockets drew high attendance numbers when they played the Seattle Thunderbirds, they did not draw as well with other teams. The Tacoma Dome was not well-suited for hockey as the risers for the seats were too shallow, making the sightlines bad for hockey.

== Franchise history ==
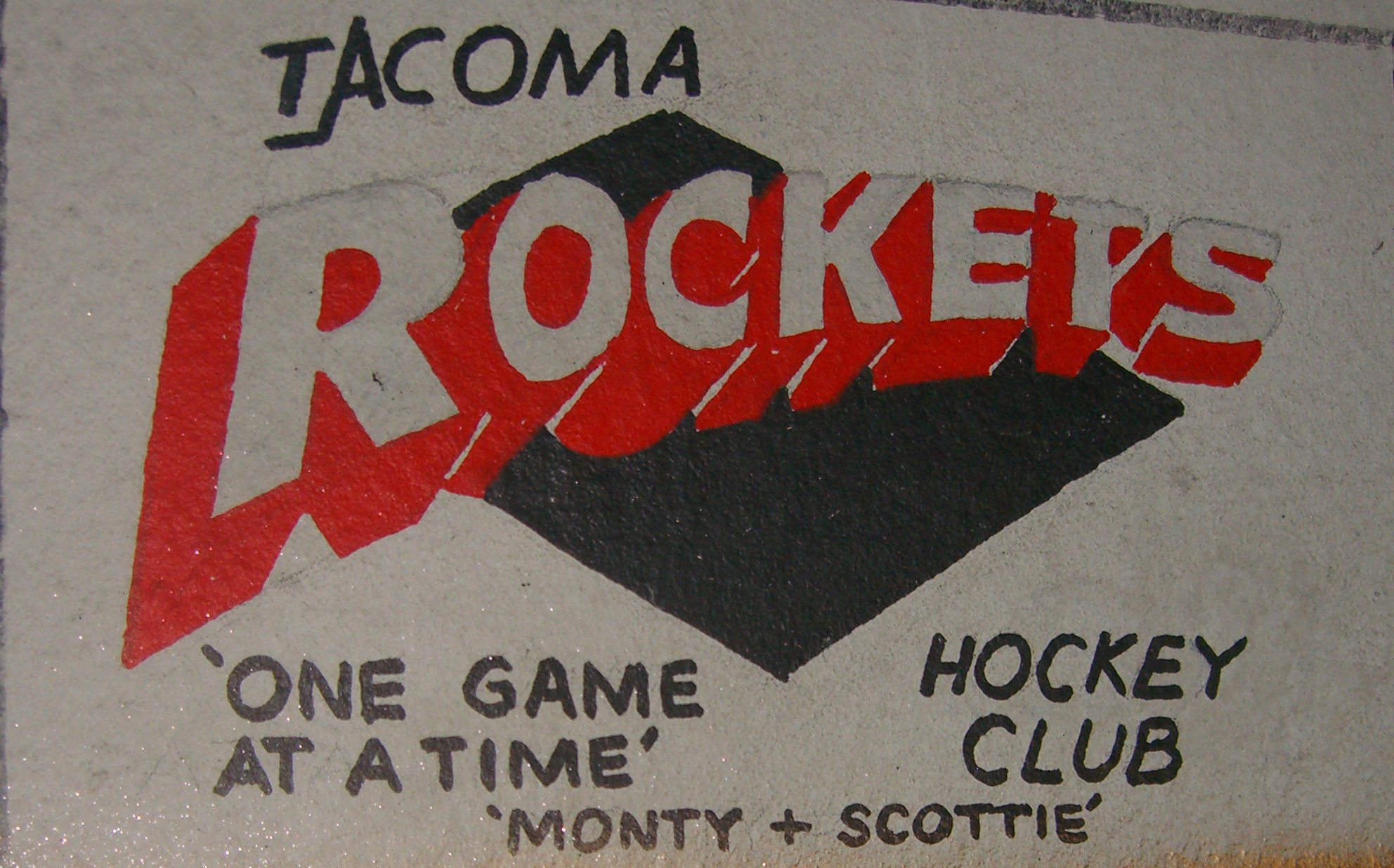
Old Tacoma Rockets logo.

Marcel Comeau was hired to be the first coach of the Rockets, and stayed with the team all four seasons. The 1991–92 season marks the first season of the expansion side Rockets, who began play in the Tacoma Dome, one of North America's largest hockey arenas. The inaugural Rockets blasted their way to one of the most memorable inaugural seasons in the 25-year history of the Western Hockey League. Attendance of 14,975 and 15,240 at two heated contests against their then arch rival, the Seattle Thunderbirds. This assisted the Rockets in chalking up the highest per game average for a first year expansion team under the Canadian Hockey League umbrella.

In 1992–93, the Rockets startled everyone in the league by winning 24 straight home games for an all-time Western Hockey League record. Tacoma held first place in the West Division for three months and finished with a promising 45–27–0 season. Head coach Marcel Comeau won the Dunc McCallum Memorial Trophy as the WHL coach of the year, and the CHL Coach of the Year Award as well. In addition to their winning streak, the Rockets home record of 36–6–0 and collecting 37 more points than the previous year, proved them serious contenders in the WHL. Once again the Rockets attendance of 13,769 saw them defeat the Seattle Thunderbirds 4-2 in win number 24, marking the third largest crowd in the history of the WHL. Three Rockets won best in the WHL West. Goaltender, Jeff Calvert – Most Valuable Player; Michal Sýkora – Most Valuable Player; and James Black selected as Most Sportsmanlike Player.

The 1993–94 season marked the year of transition for the Rockets, with the graduation of high scoring veteran Allan Egeland, a solid forward, Trever Fraser, and netminder, Jeff Calvert. The Rockets' third season also brought forward some of the league's best rookies and a phenomenal base of nine NHL drafted players. Six alone were selected in 1994, bringing the total to thirteen Rockets drafted in three seasons. Rockets finished third in the Western Hockey League with a 33–34–5 record.

Concluding the 1993–94 season with improved results, the Rockets entered their third campaign with a roster characterized by increased defensive size and the presence of nine players selected in the NHL Entry Draft. The team added Czech forward Václav Varaďa, who recorded 50 points and equalled the franchise’s rookie scoring record. Todd MacDonald, a 1993 draft selection by the Florida Panthers, assumed the role of starting goaltender and received a nomination for the Best in the West award. Veteran Dallas Thompson was appointed team captain. The Rockets finished the season in second place in the Western Conference.

== Season-by-season records ==
Note: GP = Games played, W = Wins, L = Losses, T = Ties Pts = Points, GF = Goals for, GA = Goals against

Season	GP	W	L	T	GF	GA	Points	Finish	Playoffs
1991–92	72	24	43	5	273	346	53	6th West	Lost West Division quarterfinal
1992–93	72	45	27	0	324	259	90	2nd West	Lost West Division quarterfinal
1993–94	72	33	34	5	303	301	71	3rd West	Lost West Division semifinal
1994–95	72	43	27	2	294	246	88	2nd West	Eliminated in round robin

== NHL alumni ==
- Allan Egeland
- Tuomas Gronman
- Michal Grosek
- Scott Hannan
- Tavis Hansen
- Joel Kwiatkowski
- Kyle McLaren
- Brett McLean
- Lasse Pirjeta
- Dale Purinton
- Michal Sykora
- Vaclav Varada
