= Doug Sauter =

Canadian retired ice hockey coach (born 1954)

- Born: Fairlight, Saskatchewan, Canada
- Occupation: Ice hockey Head Coach

Doug Sauter (born 1954) is a Canadian former ice hockey coach.

Sauter was the head coach of the Oklahoma City Blazers of the Central Hockey League (CHL) from 1995 to 2009. He was also the coach of the Wheeling Thunderbirds from 1992 until he departed Wheeling for Oklahoma City in 1995.

Sauter is a member of the Thunderbirds (now Nailers) Hall of Fame. In 2013, Sauter was inducted into the CHL Hall of Fame.

== Awards and honours ==
| Award | Year |
|---|---|
| Coach of the Year Award - WHL | 1979–80 |
| Dunc McCallum Memorial Trophy - WHL Coach of the Year | 1984–85 |
| John Brophy Award – ECHL Coach of the Year | 1991–92 |
| CHL Coach of the Year | 1995–96 |
