= Tri-City Americans =

Western Hockey League team in Kennewick, Washington

- City: Kennewick, Washington
- League: Western Hockey League
- Conference: Western
- Division: U.S.
- Founded: 1966
- Home arena: Toyota Center
- Colors: Navy blue, red, silver, white
- General manager: Bob Tory
- Head coach: Jody Hull
- Website: chl.ca/whl-americans

Franchise history
- 1966–1967: Calgary Buffaloes
- 1967–1977: Calgary Centennials
- 1977–1982: Billings Bighorns
- 1982–1983: Nanaimo Islanders
- 1983–1988: New Westminster Bruins
- 1988–present: Tri-City Americans

Championships
- Regular season titles: 1 (2007–08)
- Playoff championships: Conference championships 1 (2009–10)

Current uniform

The Tri-City Americans are an American major junior ice hockey team playing in the Western Hockey League and based in Kennewick, Washington. Founded in 1966 as the Calgary Buffaloes, the team settled in Kennewick in 1988 after a number of relocations. The team plays its home games at Toyota Center, which was purpose-built for the team. The team has won one Scotty Munro Memorial Trophy as regular season champions and have played in one league playoff final; however, the Americans have not won a playoff championship.

== History ==
=== Foundations ===
The Americans franchise began as a founding franchise of the league, beginning as the Calgary Buffaloes in 1966. The original team was renamed the "Centennials" after one season. In 1977, the franchise relocated to Montana and was known as the Billings Bighorns—part of an initial wave of American teams in the league. In 1982, the team moved again, this time to Nanaimo, British Columbia, where the team played for one season as the Nanaimo Islanders. The team then moved to New Westminster, BC, to become the second incarnation of the New Westminster Bruins.

In 1987, owner Ron Dixon proposed moving the team to the Tri-Cities area if local investors would put together enough money for a new arena; the proposal was endorsed, and the team moved to Kennewick and became known as the Americans in the fall of 1988. The move was seen as a gamble given the lack of hockey history in Tri-City area, but it paid off—within a few seasons, the team counted nearly 4,000 season ticket holders.

=== Tumultuous beginnings ===
The team's new arena in Kennewick, the Tri-Cities Coliseum, was not ready in time for the start of the team's first season in Washington, forcing the team to seek practice ice in Walla Walla and to play its first seventeen games on the road. The team's inaugural game was a 4–2 loss in Spokane against the Chiefs. The team finally debuted in their new home arena on November 20, 1988, defeating the Seattle Thunderbirds 4–3 in overtime in front of 6,000 spectators.

Led by stars Stu Barnes and goaltender Olaf Kolzig, the Americans were playoff contenders from the outset. The team gained widespread attention during their second season when they staged a one-game walk-out; Dixon hired Bill LaForge to manage the team, and when he stepped in for coach Rick Kozuback and allegedly levied verbal abuse at players and instructed them to injure their opponents, the players refused to play in their December 31, 1989 game against the Portland Winter Hawks. Dixon ultimately agreed that Kozuback would continue coaching the team, rather than LaForge. In that season's playoffs, during their first round series against the Thunderbirds, Kozuback and several players got into a physical altercation with fans, who had apparently been pouring beer onto the bench; Kozuback and two players were suspended, while Seattle was fined for its fans' actions.

Despite re-branding as the Americans, the team wore the New West Bruins' black-and-gold colors for the first two seasons in Kennewick, before Dixon finally paid for new uniforms in their red, white, and blue color scheme in 1990. The team found limited success in its first two decades, winning its first playoff series in 1995 over Spokane, but never advancing past the Division final.

=== Twenty-first century ===
Struggling on and off the ice, the team was nearly relocated to Chilliwack, British Columbia, in 2004. However, an ownership group including former players Kolzig and Barnes, along with Bob Tory and Dennis Loman, purchased the team and kept it in Kennewick. In 2021, Barnes would be named the team's head coach.

The Americans' had their most successful run in a five-season period from 2007–08 to 2011–12, when the team topped the U.S. Division four times. In 2007–08, led by goaltender Chet Pickard and coach-of-the-year Don Nachbaur, the team won the regular season title with a 52-win, 108-point season, before losing a seven-game conference final series against Spokane that featured a then-record five overtime games. The following season, at their annual New Year's Eve game against the Chiefs on December 31, 2008, the Americans set a team record for attendance with 6,042 attendees. In 2009–10, the Americans won their third straight division title and advanced to the championship series for the first time in history. They faced the Calgary Hitmen, losing the series in five games.

Jody Hull was named head coach for the 2025–26 WHL season.

== Season-by-season record ==
Note: GP = Games played, W = Wins, L = Losses, T = Ties OTL = Overtime losses Pts = Points, GF = Goals for, GA = Goals against

Season	GP	W	L	T	OTL	GF	GA	Points	Finish	Playoffs
1988–89	72	33	34	5	—	300	299	71	4th West	Lost West Division semifinal
1989–90	72	39	28	5	—	433	354	83	3rd West	Lost West Division semifinal
1990–91	72	36	32	4	—	404	386	76	4th West	Lost West Division semifinal
1991–92	72	35	35	2	—	363	376	72	2nd West	Lost West Division quarterfinal
1992–93	72	28	41	3	—	245	312	59	6th West	Lost West Division quarterfinal
1993–94	72	19	48	5	—	272	373	43	6th West	Lost West Division quarterfinal
1994–95	72	36	31	5	—	295	279	77	4th West	Lost West Division final
1995–96	72	45	25	2	—	336	255	92	3rd West	Lost West Division semifinal
1996–97	72	22	43	7	—	225	288	51	7th West	Did not qualify
1997–98	72	17	49	6	—	264	371	40	7th West	Did not qualify
1998–99	72	43	23	6	—	311	219	92	2nd West	Lost West Division final
1999–00	72	24	39	7	2	231	288	57	6th West	Lost West Division quarterfinal
2000–01	72	21	36	8	7	217	284	57	7th West	Did not qualify
2001–02	72	31	31	10	0	260	271	72	3rd U.S.	Lost Western Conference quarterfinal
2002–03	72	20	44	3	5	240	335	48	4th U.S.	Did not qualify
2003–04	72	31	27	10	4	205	197	76	3rd U.S.	Lost Western Conference semifinal
2004–05	72	26	34	8	4	172	196	64	4th U.S.	Lost Western Conference quarterfinal
Season	GP	W	L	OTL	SOL	GF	GA	Points	Finish	Playoffs
2005–06	72	30	35	4	3	188	221	67	4th U.S.	Lost Western Conference quarterfinal
2006–07	72	47	23	1	1	240	190	96	2nd U.S.	Lost Western Conference quarterfinal
2007–08	72	52	16	2	2	262	176	108	1st U.S.	Lost Western Conference final
2008–09	72	49	20	0	3	263	184	101	1st U.S.	Lost Western Conference semifinal
2009–10	72	47	22	1	2	272	193	97	1st U.S.	Lost final
2010–11	72	44	24	2	2	286	223	92	3rd U.S.	Lost Western Conference semifinal
2011–12	72	50	18	2	2	281	190	104	1st U.S.	Lost Western Conference final
2012–13	72	40	27	2	3	246	227	85	3rd U.S.	Lost Western Conference quarter-final
2013–14	72	29	33	4	6	178	224	68	5th U.S.	Lost Western Conference quarterfinal
2014–15	72	31	38	0	3	190	242	65	5th U.S.	Lost Western Conference quarterfinal
2015–16	72	35	34	2	1	236	253	73	5th U.S.	Did not qualify
2016–17	72	41	28	3	0	272	252	85	3rd U.S.	Lost Western Conference quarterfinal
2017–18	72	38	25	8	1	255	249	85	4th U.S.	Lost Western Conference final
2018–19	68	34	28	5	1	214	230	74	4th U.S.	Lost Western Conference quarterfinal
2019–20	63	17	40	4	2	157	302	40	5th U.S.	Cancelled due to the COVID-19 pandemic
2020–21	19	7	12	0	0	47	78	14	5th U.S.	No playoffs held due to COVID-19 pandemic
2021-22	68	19	43	6	0	179	306	44	5th U.S.	Did not qualify
2022–23	68	34	26	5	3	256	245	76	3rd U.S.	Lost Western Conference quarterfinal
2023–24	68	23	42	2	1	206	306	49	6th U.S.	Did not qualify
2024–25	68	32	29	6	1	234	268	71	4th U.S.	Lost Western Conference quarterfinal
2025–26	68	26	36	5	1	181	252	58	5th U.S.	Did not qualify

== Championship history ==
- Scotty Munro Memorial Trophy: 2007–08
- Conference championships: 2009–10
- Regular season Division titles (4): 2007–08, 2008–09, 2009–10, 2011–12

=== WHL Championship final ===
- 2009–10: Loss, 1–4 vs Calgary Hitmen

== Players ==
=== NHL alumni ===
Alumni of the Americans who played in the National Hockey League (NHL). Scott Gomez was the first former American to win the Stanley Cup.

- Carter Ashton
- Stu Barnes
- Milan Bartovic
- Jake Bean
- Shawn Belle
- Alexandre Boikov
- Brian Boucher
- Jason Bowen
- Brandon Carlo
- Dylan Coghlan
- Eric Comrie
- Kimbi Daniels
- Chris Driedger
- Brad Ference
- Brett Festerling
- Dan Focht
- Morgan Geekie
- Scott Gomez
- Patrick Holland
- Olaf Kolzig
- Zenith Komarniski
- Jaroslav Kristek
- Jason Labarbera
- Daymond Langkow
- Brett Leason
- Scott Levins
- Bill Lindsay
- Jason Marshall
- Josef Melichar
- Steve Passmore
- Stephen Peat
- Alexander Pechursky
- Ronald Petrovicky
- Carey Price
- Michael Rasmussen
- Terry Ryan
- Terran Sandwith
- Jesse Schultz
- Ray Schultz
- Brendan Shinnimin
- Todd Simpson
- Dan Smith
- Sheldon Souray
- Clayton Stoner
- Jaroslav Svejkovsky
- Billy Tibbetts
- Juuso Valimaki
- Terry Virtue
- Vladimir Vujtek
- Tyler Weiman
- Parker Wotherspoon
- B. J. Young

=== Retired numbers ===
The Americans honored Todd Klassen in 1993, months after he was killed in a car crash. The team also began awarding the Todd Klassen Humanitarian of the Year Award annually.

#	Player
8	Brian Sakic
14	Stu Barnes / Todd Klassen
33	Olaf Kolzig

== Awards ==
=== CHL awards ===
David Branch Player of the Year Award

- Brendan Shinnimin: 2011–12

CHL Goaltender of the Year

- Carey Price: 2006–07
- Chet Pickard: 2007–08

CHL Top Scorer Award

- Brendan Shinnimin: 2011–12

Brian Kilrea Coach of the Year Award

- Jim Hiller: 2011–12

=== WHL awards ===
Four Broncos Memorial Trophy
Player of the year

- Stu Barnes: 1988–89
- Brendan Shinnimin: 2011–12

Del Wilson Trophy
Goaltender of the year

- Brian Boucher: 1996–97
- Carey Price: 2006–07
- Chet Pickard: 2007–08, 2008–09

Bob Clarke Trophy
Top Scorer

- Daymond Langkow: 1994–95
- Brendan Shinnimin: 2011–12

Dunc McCallum Memorial Trophy
Coach of the year

- Don Hay: 1998–99
- Don Nachbaur: 2007–08
- Jim Hiller: 2011–12

Doug Wickenheiser Memorial Trophy
Humanitarian of the year

- Taylor Procyshen: 2008–09
- Taylor Vickerman: 2014–15

Lloyd Saunders Memorial Trophy
Executive of the year

- Don Hay: 1998–99
- Bob Tory: 2006–07, 2007–08

WHL Plus-Minus Award
Top plus-minus

- Brendan Shinnimin: 2011–12
- Zach Yuen: 2011–12
