= Dean Clark (ice hockey) =

Canadian ice hockey player, coach (born 1964)

- Born: January 16, 1964 (age 62) Edmonton, Alberta, Canada
- Height: 6 ft 1 in (185 cm)
- Weight: 180 lb (82 kg; 12 st 12 lb)
- Position: Left wing
- Shot: Left
- Played for: Edmonton Oilers
- NHL draft: 167th overall, 1982; Edmonton Oilers
- Playing career: 1982–1987

Dean Clark (born January 16, 1964) is a Canadian former ice hockey winger and head coach in the Western Hockey League. He played one game in the National Hockey League for the Edmonton Oilers in 1984.

== Biography ==
Clark was born in Edmonton, Alberta. As a youth, he played in the 1976 and 1977 Quebec International Pee-Wee Hockey Tournaments with a minor ice hockey team from St. Albert, Alberta.

Clark spent three years playing in the Western Hockey League With the Kamloops Blazers from 1982–85, where he won a President's Cup in 1984 with the Blazers. Clark's one game with the Oilers in 1983–84 was the only professional game he played. He played hockey with the Ferris State University Bulldogs in 1982-83.

Clark was drafted by the Edmonton Oilers in the 8th round, 167th overall in the 1982 NHL entry draft and played one NHL game for the Oilers.

Clark returned to the game in 1996 as head coach of the Calgary Hitmen after Graham James was forced to resign as Calgary's before the start of that season. In his first full year as Hitmen coach, Clark guided the formerly woeful franchise to a division title. This accomplishment earned him the Dunc McCallum Memorial Trophy as WHL coach of the year. He was also named the CHL coach of the year. The next year, in 1998–99, he guided the Hitmen to their first WHL championship. Clark left the Hitmen after two more successful seasons after compiling a mark of 183–118–30–3. He holds the Hitmen records for games coached, wins, winning percentage, and playoff wins.

Clark coached the Brandon Wheat Kings from 2001–03 before moving on to his position as coach of the Blazers. He was fired in his fourth season as Blazers coach on November 7, 2007. Clark recorded his 300th win as a coach with the Blazers in 2005 and is among the top ten winningest coaches in WHL playoff history. Clark is also the former head coach of the Prince George Cougars.

== Career statistics ==
=== Regular season and playoffs ===
| | | | Regular season | | | | | Playoffs |
| Season | Team | League | GP | G | A | Pts | PIM | GP | G | A | Pts | PIM |
|---|---|---|---|---|---|---|---|---|---|---|---|---|
| 1980–81 | St. Albert Saints | AJHL | 44 | 5 | 15 | 20 | 18 | — | — | — | — | — |
| 1981–82 | St. Albert Saints | AJHL | 59 | 21 | 32 | 53 | 146 | — | — | — | — | — |
| 1982–83 | Ferris State University | CCHA | 19 | 3 | 9 | 12 | 28 | — | — | — | — | — |
| 1982–83 | Kamloops Junior Oilers | WHL | 39 | 17 | 24 | 41 | 63 | 7 | 2 | 6 | 8 | 12 |
| 1983–84 | Kamloops Junior Oilers | WHL | 54 | 18 | 28 | 46 | 64 | 13 | 0 | 3 | 3 | 12 |
| 1983–84 | Edmonton Oilers | NHL | 1 | 0 | 0 | 0 | 0 | — | — | — | — | — |
| 1983–84 | Kamloops Junior Oilers | M-Cup | — | — | — | — | — | 4 | 0 | 2 | 2 | 12 |
| 1984–85 | Kamloops Junior Oilers | WHL | 36 | 15 | 36 | 51 | 33 | — | — | — | — | — |
| 1985–86 | Northern Alberta Institute of Technology | ACAC | 17 | 3 | 14 | 17 | 43 | — | — | — | — | — |
| 1986–87 | University of Alberta | CIAU | 40 | 10 | 23 | 33 | 55 | — | — | — | — | — |
| WHL totals | | | 129 | 50 | 88 | 138 | 160 | 20 | 2 | 9 | 11 | 24 |
| NHL totals | | | 1 | 0 | 0 | 0 | 0 | — | — | — | — | — |

== See also ==
- List of players who played only one game in the NHL
