= Tom Kowal =

Canadian ice hockey referee

Tom Kowal (born November 2, 1967, in Vernon, British Columbia), has been a National Hockey League referee since the 1999–2000 NHL season, and wears uniform number 32.

Tom lives in High River, Alberta with his 1 son, 2 daughters, and wife.

Tom had his 1000th career game on January 19, 2017, between the Nashville Predators and the Calgary Flames. Nashville won 4-3.
