= 1994–95 WHL season =

Western Hockey League (WHL) season

- League: Western Hockey League
- Sport: Ice hockey
- Teams: 16

Regular season
- Scotty Munro Memorial Trophy: Kamloops Blazers (7)
- Season MVP: Marty Murray (Brandon Wheat Kings)
- Top scorer: Daymond Langkow (Tri-City Americans)

Playoffs
- Playoffs MVP: Nolan Baumgartner (Blazers)
- Finals champions: Kamloops Blazers (6)
- Runners-up: Brandon Wheat Kings

WHL seasons
- 1993–94 1995–96

1994–95 CHL season
- League: Canadian Hockey League
- Sport: Ice hockey
- Teams: 45

OHL

QMJHL

WHL

Memorial Cup
- Finals champions: Kamloops Blazers (WHL) (3rd title)
- Runners-up: Detroit Junior Red Wings (OHL)

The 1994–95 WHL season was the 29th season of the Western Hockey League (WHL), featuring sixteen teams and a 72-game regular season. The Kamloops Blazers entrenched their major junior dynasty by winning their seventh Scotty Munro Memorial Trophy, their sixth President's Cup championship—their third in four seasons—and their third Memorial Cup title in four seasons.

The season was the first for the Prince George Cougars, after the Victoria Cougars relocated to Prince George, British Columbia in the off-season, making the Cougars the northern-most team in the Canadian Hockey League.

== Team changes ==
- The Victoria Cougars relocate to Prince George, British Columbia, becoming the Prince George Cougars.

== Regular season ==
=== Final standings ===
East Division
Pos	Team	Pld	W	L	T	GF	GA	Pts
1	x – Brandon Wheat Kings	72	45	22	5	315	235	95
2	x – Prince Albert Raiders	72	44	26	2	308	267	90
3	x – Saskatoon Blades	72	41	23	8	324	254	90
4	x – Moose Jaw Warriors	72	39	32	1	315	275	79
5	x – Medicine Hat Tigers	72	38	32	2	244	229	78
6	x – Swift Current Broncos	72	31	34	7	274	284	69
7	x – Regina Pats	72	26	43	3	269	306	55
8	Lethbridge Hurricanes	72	22	48	2	263	341	46
9	Red Deer Rebels	72	17	51	4	209	356	38

x – qualified for playoffs

West Division
Pos	Team	Pld	W	L	T	GF	GA	Pts
1	x – Kamloops Blazers	72	52	14	6	375	202	110
2	x – Tacoma Rockets	72	43	27	2	294	246	88
3	x – Seattle Thunderbirds	72	42	28	2	319	282	86
4	x – Tri-City Americans	72	36	31	5	295	279	77
5	x – Spokane Chiefs	72	32	36	4	244	261	68
6	x – Portland Winter Hawks	72	23	43	6	240	308	52
7	Prince George Cougars	72	14	55	3	229	392	31

x – qualified for playoffs

=== Scoring leaders ===
Note: GP = Games played; G = Goals; A = Assists; Pts = Points; PIM = Penalties in minutes

Player	Team	GP	G	A	Pts	PIM
Daymond Langkow	Tri-City Americans	72	67	73	140	142
Darcy Tucker	Kamloops Blazers	64	64	73	137	94
Marty Murray	Brandon Wheat Kings	65	40	88	128	53
Stacy Roest	Medicine Hat Tigers	69	37	78	115	32
Darren Ritchie	Brandon Wheat Kings	69	62	52	114	12
Hnat Domenichelli	Kamloops Blazers	72	52	62	114	34
Terry Ryan	Tri-City Americans	70	50	60	110	207
Curtis Brown	Moose Jaw Warriors	70	51	53	104	63
Mark Deyell	Saskatoon Blades	70	34	68	102	56
Chris Herperger	Seattle Thunderbirds	59	49	52	101	106

== 1995 WHL Playoffs ==
- In the West Division, 2 groups of 3 teams played a round robin of 4 games to determine who would advance to the Division Semi-Finals. In group A, Kamloops (3-1) and Portland (3-1) advanced while Seattle (0-4) was eliminated. In group B, Spokane (3-1) and Tri-City (2-2) advanced while Tacoma (1-3) was eliminated.

First Round
E1	Brandon	bye
E4	Moose Jaw	4
E5	Medicine Hat	1
E2	Prince Albert	4
E7	Regina	0
E3	Saskatoon	4
E6	Swift Current	2

Division Semi-Finals
E1	Brandon	4
E4	Moose Jaw	1
E2	Prince Albert	4
E3	Saskatoon	0
W1	Kamloops	4
W6	Portland	1
W4	Tri-City	4
W5	Spokane	3

Division Finals
E1	Brandon	4
E2	Prince Albert	3
W1	Kamloops	4
W4	Tri-City	2

WHL Championship
E1	Brandon	2
W1	Kamloops	4

== All-Star game ==
On January 31, A combined WHL/QMJHL all-star team defeated the OHL all-stars 8–3 at Kitchener, Ontario before a crowd of 5,679.

== WHL awards ==
Player of the Year - Four Broncos Memorial Trophy: Marty Murray, Brandon Wheat Kings
Scholastic Player of the Year - Daryl K. (Doc) Seaman Trophy: Perry Johnson, Regina Pats
Top Scorer - Bob Clarke Trophy: Daymond Langkow, Tri-City Americans
Most Sportsmanlike Player - Brad Hornung Trophy: Darren Ritchie, Brandon Wheat Kings
Top Defenseman - Bill Hunter Trophy: Nolan Baumgartner, Kamloops Blazers
Rookie of the Year - Jim Piggott Memorial Trophy: Todd Robinson, Portland Winter Hawks
Top Goaltender - Del Wilson Trophy: Paxton Schafer, Medicine Hat Tigers
Coach of the Year - Dunc McCallum Memorial Trophy: Don Nachbaur, Seattle Thunderbirds
Executive of the Year - Lloyd Saunders Memorial Trophy: Kelly McCrimmon, Brandon Wheat Kings
Regular season Champions - Scotty Munro Memorial Trophy: Kamloops Blazers
Top Official - Allen Paradice Memorial Trophy: Tom Kowal
Marketing/Public Relations Award - St. Clair Group Trophy: Herm Hordal, Saskatoon Blades
WHL Humanitarian of the Year: Grady Manson, Moose Jaw Warriors
WHL Plus-Minus Award: Darren Ritchie, Brandon Wheat Kings
Playoff Most Valuable Player: Nolan Baumgartner, Kamloops Blazers

== All-Star teams ==
East Division
	First Team		Second Team	
Goal	Paxton Schafer	Medicine Hat Tigers	Byron Penstock	Brandon Wheat Kings
Defense	Chad Allan	Saskatoon Blades	Chris Armstrong	Moose Jaw Warriors
Defense	Bryan McCabe	Brandon Wheat Kings	Wade Redden	Brandon Wheat Kings
Forward	Marty Murray	Brandon Wheat Kings	Paul Healey	Prince Albert Raiders
Forward	Darren Ritchie	Brandon Wheat Kings	Stacy Roest	Medicine Hat Tigers
Forward	Curtis Brown	Moose Jaw Warriors	Ryan Smyth	Moose Jaw Warriors
West Division
	First Team		Second Team	
Goal	Todd MacDonald	Tacoma Rockets	Scott Langkow	Portland Winter Hawks
Defense	Nolan Baumgartner	Kamloops Blazers	Alexander Alexeev	Tacoma Rockets
Defense	Deron Quint	Seattle Thunderbirds	Sean Gillam (tied)	Spokane Chiefs
Defense	-	-	Aaron Keller (tied)	Kamloops Blazers
Forward	Daymond Langkow	Tri-City Americans	Hnat Domenichelli	Kamloops Blazers
Forward	Darcy Tucker	Kamloops Blazers	Chris Herperger	Seattle Thunderbirds
Forward	Chris Wells	Seattle Thunderbirds	Terry Ryan	Tri-City Americans

== See also ==
- 1995 NHL entry draft
- 1994 in sports
- 1995 in sports

Preceded by 1993–94 WHL season	WHL seasons	Succeeded by 1995–96 WHL season
