= Cory Clouston =

Canadian ice hockey player & coach (born 1969)

- Born: September 19, 1969 (age 57) Viking, Alberta, Canada
- Current DEL coach: Kölner Haie
- Coached for: Ottawa Senators (NHL); Binghamton Senators (AHL); Kootenay Ice (WHL); Brandon Wheat Kings (WHL); Prince Albert Raiders (WHL)
- Coaching career: 1994–present

Cory Clouston (/ˈkluːstən/; born September 19, 1969) is an ice hockey coach, who most recently served as head coach of the Kölner Haie of the DEL. He has previously served as head coach of the Ottawa Senators of the National Hockey League (NHL), the Binghamton Senators of the American Hockey League (AHL), the Prince Albert Raiders, the Brandon Wheat Kings and the Kootenay Ice of the Western Hockey League.

== Playing career ==
Born in Viking, Alberta, Clouston attended the University of Alberta from 1989–1993 where he earned a bachelor's degree in recreation administration. He played hockey for the University's Golden Bears team and was a member of the 1991–92 Canadian Interuniversity Sport championship squad.

== Early coaching career ==
Clouston's first coaching position was as an assistant coach with the Powell River Paper Kings of the British Columbia Junior Hockey League in 1994-95. He then served as general manager and head coach of the Grande Prairie Storm of the Alberta Junior Hockey League. During his tenure with the Storm, the team compiled a .627 winning percentage (143-82-15) and he was named AJHL coach of the year in 1995-96. He joined the staff of the Kootenay Ice of the Western Hockey League (WHL) in 1999 as an assistant coach. In the summer of 2002, he was elevated to the head coach position of the Ice, which he held for five years compiling a .655 winning percentage (209–110–20–21). The club's best season under his leadership was 2004–05 when the club made it to the Western Conference final. Clouston also served as a coach for Hockey Canada during his junior hockey coaching years, as assistant coach for the national under-18 2005 Junior World Cup gold medalists, and head coach for the 2006 team that also took home gold.

== NHL coach ==
Clouston joined the professional team coaching ranks in 2007, when he joined the Binghamton Senators of the American Hockey League (AHL). He was elevated to the head coaching position with the Ottawa Senators on February 2, 2009, following the firing of Craig Hartsburg. Though initially named interim head coach in Ottawa, Clouston's early success was rewarded and the club signed him to a two-year contract extension on April 8, 2009. He was the eighth person to hold the head coach position in modern Senators' history.

With Ottawa, Clouston had attempted to change the Senators' game plan to be more of an attacking one, creating turnovers and generating offense as opposed to the defence-first system which Hartsburg had attempted to utilize. Clouston coached the Senators to a somewhat successful 2009-10 season, finishing with 44 wins and 94 points and a berth in the Stanley Cup playoffs. The team ultimately lost in the first round to the Pittsburgh Penguins. A disappointing 2010-11 season saw Ottawa, beset by injuries to key players Daniel Alfredsson and Jason Spezza and erratic goaltending, languish in last place of the Eastern Conference standings for several weeks. General manager Bryan Murray made a flurry of midseason trades and promoted many minor leaguers for tryouts. The Senators played better as the season wound down, but finished out of the playoffs. Clouston was relieved of his duties by GM Bryan Murray on April 9, 2011.

On June 14, 2011, the Senators announced former Detroit Red Wings assistant coach Paul MacLean as Clouston's successor.

== Return to the WHL ==
On August 3, 2011, Clouston was named head coach of the Brandon Wheat Kings, replacing Kelly McCrimmon, who stepped aside to focus on his duties as GM. On May 15, 2012, it was announced that Clouston would not return as head coach of the Wheat Kings.

From June 1, 2013 to October 31, 2014, Clouston served as head coach of the Prince Albert Raiders. His record as the Raiders' coach was 41-41-3-2.

== Coach in Germany ==
On January 21, 2016 Clouston was named head coach of Kölner Haie in the German DEL. He signed a deal for the remainder of the 2015-16 season, replacing Niklas Sundblad and led the Haie squad to a playoff semifinal appearance. In April 2016, he signed a new deal with Kölner Haie for the 2016-17 season. On January 19, 2017, he had his contract extended until 2019. After a series of bad results (three losses out of four games), he was relieved of his duties on November 20, 2017.

== NHL coaching record ==
Team	Year	Regular Season					Post Season		
Team	Year	W	L	OTL	Win %	Finish	W	L	Result
OTT	2008–09	19	11	4	.633	4th in Northeast Division	-	-	Failed to Qualify
OTT	2009–10	44	32	6	.578	2nd in Northeast Division	2	4	Lost in Conference Quarterfinals (PIT)
OTT	2010–11	32	40	10	.444	5th in Northeast Division	-	-	Failed to Qualify
Total		95	83	20	.533		2	4	1 playoff appearance

== Awards and records ==
- 1996 – Alberta Junior Hockey League coach of the year
- 2005 – Dunc McCallum Memorial Trophy (WHL coach of the year)
- 2005 – Brian Kilrea Coach of the Year Award (CHL coach of the year)
- 2007 – Dunc McCallum Memorial Trophy

Preceded by Craig Hartsburg	Head coach of the Ottawa Senators; 2009–2011	Succeeded by Paul MacLean
