= Don Nachbaur =

Canadian ice hockey player and coach

- Born: January 30, 1959 (age 67) Kitimat, British Columbia, Canada
- Height: 6 ft 2 in (188 cm)
- Weight: 200 lb (91 kg; 14 st 4 lb)
- Position: Centre
- Shot: Left
- Played for: Hartford Whalers; Edmonton Oilers; Philadelphia Flyers; ATSE Graz; EC Graz
- NHL draft: 60th overall, 1979; Hartford Whalers
- Playing career: 1979–1994

Donald Kenneth Nachbaur (born January 30, 1959) is a Canadian professional ice hockey coach and former player who is currently serving as head coach for the Wenatchee Wild in the Western Hockey League (WHL). He played eight seasons in the National Hockey League (NHL) with the Hartford Whalers, Edmonton Oilers, and Philadelphia Flyers between 1980 and 1990. He would later spend four years in the Austrian Hockey League. After retiring from playing, Nachbaur turned to coaching, including serving as a head coach for over twenty seasons, primarily in the Western Hockey League (WHL). He has also spent time as an assistant coach for the Los Angeles Kings of the NHL.

== Early life ==
Nachbaur was born on January 30, 1959, in Kitimat, British Columbia, and was raised in Prince George, British Columbia.

== Playing career ==
Nachbaur played his junior career with the Billings Bighorns of the WHL. In two seasons, where he played 162 games (regular-season and Playoffs), he scored 87 goals, added 89 assists for 176 points and accumulated 350 minutes in penalties. Nachbaur still shares the WHL record for most goals in a playoff game where he scored 5 goals on April 20, 1978, at Vancouver, against New Westminster Bruins. Bighorns won 7–4.

Nachbaur played in the NHL with the Hartford Whalers, Edmonton Oilers and Philadelphia Flyers, and played professionally for 14 years, including parts of eight seasons in the National Hockey League (NHL). In 223 NHL games, he scored 23 goals, added 46 assists and recorded 465 penalty minutes. He was the Whalers' third-round selection (60th overall) in the 1979 NHL entry draft.

Nachbaur played 469 games in the American Hockey League (AHL) where he scored 174 goals, added 187 assists for a total of 361 points. He accumulated 1,452 penalty minutes. He won the Calder Cup with the Hershey Bears in the 1987–88 season.

Nachbaur played for ATSE Graz and EC Graz in Austria from 1990 to 1994 where in 182 games he scored 106 goals and added 103 assists for 209 points.

== Coaching career ==
Nachbaur began his coaching career in the 1994–95 season, when he was named head coach of the Seattle Thunderbirds of the Western Hockey League (WHL). He won WHL coach of the year award that season when he led the team to a 42–28–2 record and remained with the Thunderbirds as their head coach until 2000.

Nachbaur then served as an assistant coach for the Philadelphia Phantoms of the American Hockey League (AHL) from 2000 to 2002.

From 2003 to 2009, he served as head coach of the Tri-City Americans of the WHL, earning a .592 winning percentage with 235 wins, 155 losses, 25 overtime losses and 17 shootout defeats over the span of 432 regular season games. His teams made the playoffs in each of his seasons behind the bench, advancing as far as the conference final in 2007–08. On November 29, 2008, Nachbaur became just the tenth WHL coach to win 400 games when the Americans defeated the Vancouver Giants. The Americans won the WHL's U.S. Division regular season title in each of his last two seasons, the first time in franchise history they accomplished the feat. In the 2007–08 season, Nachbaur won his second WHL coach of the year award when he led them to a 52–16–2–2 record and gained a franchise-record 108 points.

For the 2009–10 season, Nachbaur joined the Binghamton Senators of the AHL. After the season he returned to WHL and joined the Spokane Chiefs as their head coach. At the end of the 2016–17 season, and with the Chiefs not making the playoffs for the first time in many years, it was announced that Nachbaur and the Chiefs agreed to mutually part ways.

On June 22, 2017, the Los Angeles Kings announced that Nachbaur was hired as assistant coach. Nachbaur was fired from the Kings on November 4, 2018 along with head coach John Stevens.

After leaving the Kings, Nachbaur was hired as a head coach by HKM Zvolen of the Slovak Extraliga for the 2019-20 season.

On June 15, 2020, Nachbaur was announced as the new head coach of SC Bern in the National League (NL), joining the nation's capital on a two-year deal. On December 1, 2020, SC Bern announced that Nachbaur had resigned as head coach of the team.

After leaving Bern, Nachbaur rejoined the Tri-City Americans on February 18 2021, this time as an associate coach for the remainder of the 2020-21 WHL season.

Prior to the 2021-22 season, Nachbaur was hired by the Calgary Flames as an assistant coach for their top level affiliate, the Stockton Heat of the AHL. Nachbaur would remain with the team through their move to become the Calgary Wranglers.

On July 11th, 2024, he was named the new head coach for the Wenatchee Wild of the Western Hockey League (WHL).

== Career statistics ==
=== Regular season and playoffs ===
			Regular season					Playoffs
Season	Team	League	GP	G	A	Pts	PIM	GP	G	A	Pts	PIM
1976–77	Merritt Centennials	BCJHL	54	22	27	49	31	—	—	—	—	—
1977–78	Billings Bighorns	WCHL	68	23	27	50	128	20	18	7	25	37
1978–79	Billings Bighorns	WHL	69	44	52	96	175	8	2	3	5	10
1979–80	Springfield Indians	AHL	70	12	17	29	119	—	—	—	—	—
1980–81	Hartford Whalers	NHL	77	16	17	33	139	—	—	—	—	—
1981–82	Hartford Whalers	NHL	77	5	21	26	117	—	—	—	—	—
1982–83	Moncton Alpines	AHL	70	33	33	66	125	—	—	—	—	—
1982–83	Edmonton Oilers	NHL	4	0	0	0	17	2	0	0	0	7
1983–84	New Haven Nighthawks	AHL	70	33	32	65	194	—	—	—	—	—
1984–85	Hershey Bears	AHL	7	2	3	5	21	—	—	—	—	—
1985–86	Hershey Bears	AHL	74	23	24	47	301	18	5	4	9	70
1985–86	Philadelphia Flyers	NHL	5	1	1	2	7	—	—	—	—	—
1986–87	Hershey Bears	AHL	57	18	17	35	274	5	0	3	3	47
1986–87	Philadelphia Flyers	NHL	23	0	2	2	87	7	1	1	2	15
1987–88	Hershey Bears	AHL	42	19	21	40	174	8	4	3	7	47
1987–88	Philadelphia Flyers	NHL	20	0	4	4	61	2	0	0	0	2
1988–89	Hershey Bears	AHL	49	24	31	55	172	12	0	5	5	58
1988–89	Philadelphia Flyers	NHL	15	1	0	1	37	—	—	—	—	—
1989–90	Hershey Bears	AHL	30	10	9	19	72	—	—	—	—	—
1989–90	Philadelphia Flyers	NHL	2	0	1	1	0	—	—	—	—	—
1990–91	ATSE Graz	AUT	33	18	25	43	99	—	—	—	—	—
1991–92	EC Graz	AUT	44	32	29	61	137	—	—	—	—	—
1992–93	EC Graz	AUT	53	35	29	64	197	—	—	—	—	—
1993–94	EC Graz	AUT	52	21	20	41	65	—	—	—	—	—
AHL totals			469	174	187	361	1452	43	9	15	24	222
NHL totals			223	23	46	69	465	11	1	1	2	24

== Head coaching record ==
=== Professional ===
League	Team	Season	Regular season							Postseason
League	Team	Season	G	W	L	T	OTL/SOL	Pts	Finish	Result
AHL	Binghamton Senators	2009–10	80	36	35	—	9	81	5th, East	Missed playoffs
Slovak	HKM Zvolen	2019-20	55	29	22	—	4	91	6th	No playoffs held
NL	SC Bern	2020–21	12	4	7	—	1	13	Resigned mid season	—

=== WHL ===
Team	Year	Regular season								Postseason
Team	Year	G	W	L	T	OTL	SL	Pts	Finish	Result
Seattle Thunderbirds	1994-95	72	42	28	2	—	—	86	3rd in West	Missed playoffs
Seattle Thunderbirds	1995-96	72	29	36	7	—	—	65	5th in West	Lost in first round
Seattle Thunderbirds	1996-97	72	41	27	4	—	—	86	2nd in West	Lost in final round
Seattle Thunderbirds	1997-98	72	31	35	6	—	—	68	6th in West	Lost in first round
Seattle Thunderbirds	1998-99	72	37	24	11	—	—	85	3rd in West	Lost in second round
Seattle Thunderbirds	1999-00	50	22	21	4	3	—	51	Replaced mid season	—
Tri-City Americans	2003-04	72	31	27	10	4	—	76	3rd in U.S.	Lost in second round
Tri-City Americans	2004-05	72	26	34	8	4	—	64	4th in U.S.	Lost in first round
Tri-City Americans	2005-06	72	30	35	—	4	3	67	4th in U.S.	Lost in first round
Tri-City Americans	2006-07	72	47	23	—	1	1	96	2nd in U.S.	Lost in first round
Tri-City Americans	2007-08	72	52	16	—	2	2	108	1st in U.S.	Lost in third round
Tri-City Americans	2008-09	72	49	20	—	0	3	101	1st in U.S.	Lost in second round
Spokane Chiefs	2010-11	72	48	18	—	4	2	102	2nd in U.S.	Lost in third round
Spokane Chiefs	2011-12	72	38	25	—	5	4	85	5th in West	Lost in second round
Spokane Chiefs	2012-13	64 (Note: Nachbaur left the team for 8 games while acting as an assistant coach for Team Canada during the 2013 World Junior Ice Hockey Championships. Jon Klemm acted as interim head coach during his departure, with a record of 3-5-0.)	41	21	—	2	0	84	4th in West	Lost in second round
Spokane Chiefs	2013-14	72	40	26	—	3	3	86	6th in West	Lost in first round
Spokane Chiefs	2014-15	72	34	34	—	3	1	72	4th in U.S.	Lost in first round
Spokane Chiefs	2015-16	72	33	30	—	5	4	75	4th in U.S.	Lost in first round
Spokane Chiefs	2016-17	72	27	33	—	8	4	66	5th in U.S.	Missed playoffs
WHL totals		1338	698	514	52	48	27			
