= Maxim Bets =

Russian ice hockey player (born 1974)

- Born: January 31, 1974 (age 52) Chelyabinsk, Soviet Union
- Height: 6 ft 1 in (185 cm)
- Weight: 185 lb (84 kg; 13 st 3 lb)
- Position: Left wing
- Shot: Left
- Played for: Traktor Chelyabinsk; Mighty Ducks of Anaheim; HC CSKA Moscow; Metallurg Magnitogorsk; Severstal Cherepovets; Molot-Prikamye Perm; Krylya Sovetov Moscow
- NHL draft: 37th overall, 1993; St. Louis Blues
- Playing career: 1991–2010

Maxim Bets (Russian: Максим Николаевич Бец; born 1974) is a Russian former professional ice hockey player who played three games in the National Hockey League for the Mighty Ducks of Anaheim.

== Career ==
Bets began his career in Russia with Traktor Chelyabinsk before moving to North America in the junior Western Hockey League where he spent two highly productive seasons with the Spokane Chiefs, scoring 49 goals and 57 assists for 106 points in 1992–93 and 46 goals and 70 assists for 116 points in 1993–94, finishing second for the team between Valeri Bure and Ryan Duthie respectively.

Bets was drafted 37th overall by the St. Louis Blues in the 1993 NHL entry draft, but while with the Chiefs, his rights were traded to the Mighty Ducks of Anaheim for fellow Russian Alexei Kasatonov and played three games for the Mighty Ducks during the 1993–94 NHL season but failed to register a point. It turned out to be Bets' only NHL experience as he spent the rest of his time in North America with spells with the San Diego Gulls of the IHL, the Worcester IceCats and the Baltimore Bandits of the AHL and the Raleigh IceCaps of the ECHL.

Bets returned to Russia in 1996 in the Russian Superleague with one season spells with HC CSKA Moscow, Traktor Chelyabinsk, Mechel Chelyabinsk and Metallurg Magnitogorsk. He rejoined Mechel Chelyabinsk for another season before spending another season playing for Severstal Cherepovets and then split the 2002–03 season with Molot-Prikamye Perm and Krylya Sovetov Moscow.

In 2003, he returned to Mechel Chelyabinsk a third time who were now playing in the Vysshaya Liga and spent three seasons with the team joining Traktor Chelyabinsk for a third spell at the conclusion of the 2005–06 season. He spent a season with Kazakhmis Satpaev before joining Mechel Chelyabinsk for a fourth time. In 2008, Bets signed with Gazprom-OGU Orenburg.

== Career statistics ==
=== Regular season and playoffs ===
			Regular season					Playoffs
Season	Team	League	GP	G	A	Pts	PIM	GP	G	A	Pts	PIM
1991–92	Traktor Chelyabinsk	CIS	25	1	1	2	8	—	—	—	—	—
1992–93	Spokane Chiefs	WHL	54	49	57	106	130	9	5	6	11	20
1993–94	Spokane Chiefs	WHL	63	46	70	116	111	3	1	1	1	12
1993–94	Mighty Ducks of Anaheim	NHL	3	0	0	0	0	—	—	—	—	—
1993–94	San Diego Gulls	IHL	—	—	—	—	—	9	0	2	2	0
1994–95	San Diego Gulls	IHL	36	2	6	8	31	—	—	—	—	—
1994–95	Worcester IceCats	AHL	9	1	1	2	6	—	—	—	—	—
1995–96	Baltimore Bandits	AHL	34	5	5	10	18	—	—	—	—	—
1995–96	Raleigh IceCaps	ECHL	9	0	4	4	6	4	0	0	0	0
1996–97	CSKA Moscow	RSL	16	3	2	5	12	—	—	—	—	—
1997–98	Traktor Chelyabinsk	RSL	35	12	9	21	16	—	—	—	—	—
1998–99	Mechel Chelyabinsk	RSL	41	12	19	31	57	3	0	1	1	2
1999–00	Metallurg Magnitogorsk	RSL	36	3	5	8	26	12	4	2	6	12
2000–01	Mechel Chelyabinsk	RSL	32	9	12	21	36	2	0	0	0	0
2001–02	Severstal Cherepovets	RSL	35	7	11	18	18	4	2	1	3	2
2002–03	Molot-Prikamye Perm	RSL	32	9	12	21	36	—	—	—	—	—
2002–03	Krylya Sovetov Moscow	RSL	9	0	0	0	8	—	—	—	—	—
2003–04	Mechel Chelyabinsk	RUS-2	49	8	25	33	24	12	1	4	5	8
2004–05	Mechel Chelyabinsk	RUS-2	47	9	14	23	20	8	2	0	2	6
2005–06	Mechel Chelyabinsk	RUS-2	43	13	20	33	32	—	—	—	—	—
2005–06	Traktor Chelyabinsk	RUS-2	7	1	4	5	6	11	1	3	4	8
2006–07	Kazakhmys Satpaev	RUS-2	44	9	11	20	54	—	—	—	—	—
2006–07	Kazakhmys Satpaev	KAZ	24	10	8	18	10	—	—	—	—	—
2007–08	Mechel Chelyabinsk	RUS-2	36	6	7	13	28	—	—	—	—	—
2008–09	Gazprom-OGU Orenburg	RUS-2	55	8	18	26	36	—	—	—	—	—
NHL totals			3	0	0	0	0	—	—	—	—	—
RSL totals			234	48	63	111	185	21	6	4	10	6

=== International ===
Year	Team	Event	GP	G	A	Pts	PIM
1994	Russia	WJC	7	0	0	0	8
Junior totals			7	0	0	0	8
