= Louis Dumont (disambiguation) =

Louis Dumont may refer to:

- Louis Dumont (1911–1998), French anthropologist
- Louis Dumont (ice hockey) (born 1973), Canadian ice hockey player
- Pierre Étienne Louis Dumont (1759–1829), French political writer
