= Priestner =

Priestner is a surname. Notable people with the surname include:

- Cathy Priestner (born 1956), Canadian speed skater
- Colin Priestner (born 1984), Canadian hockey executive, singer-songwriter, and athlete
- John Priestner (born 1958), Canadian football player
