= Marty Murray =

Canadian ice hockey player

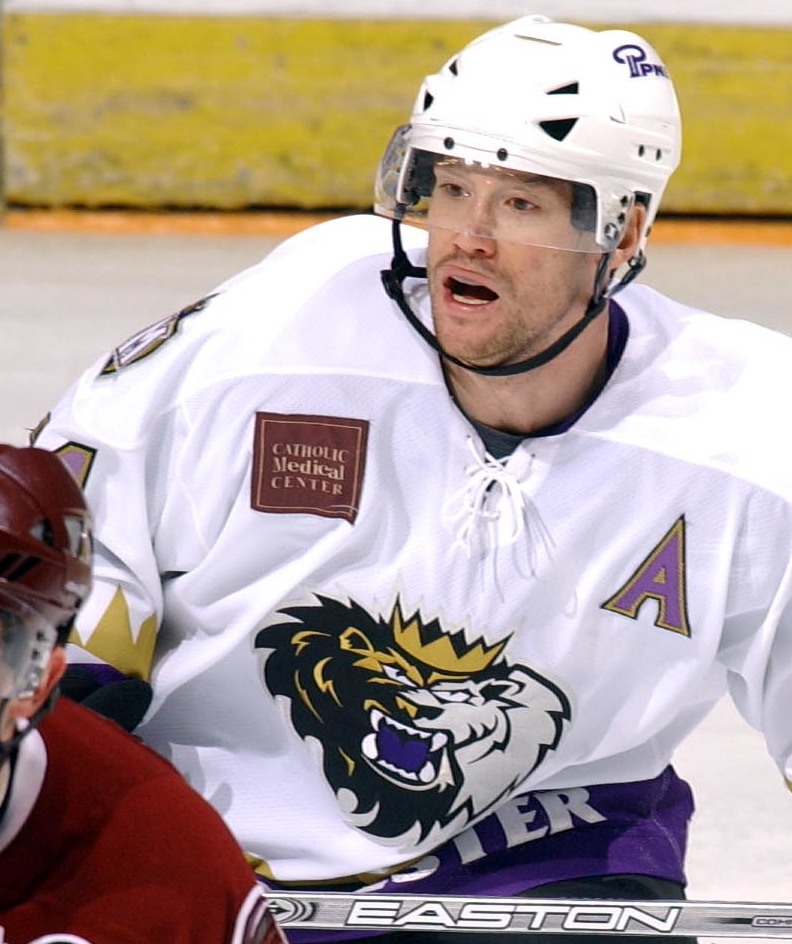
- Murray with the Manchester Monarchs in 2007
- Born: February 16, 1975 (age 51) Deloraine, Manitoba, Canada
- Height: 5 ft 9 in (175 cm)
- Weight: 180 lb (82 kg; 12 st 12 lb)
- Position: Centre
- Shot: Left
- Played for: Calgary Flames; Philadelphia Flyers; Carolina Hurricanes; Los Angeles Kings
- National team: Canada
- NHL draft: 96th overall, 1993; Calgary Flames
- Playing career: 1995–2010

Marty Murray (born February 16, 1975) is a Canadian former professional ice hockey centre who played eight seasons in the National Hockey League (NHL) for the Calgary Flames, Philadelphia Flyers, Carolina Hurricanes and Los Angeles Kings. He is currently the general manager and head coach of the Western Hockey League's Brandon Wheat Kings, and was formerly the general manager and head coach of the Sioux Falls Stampede.

== Playing career ==
Murray was drafted 96th overall by the Calgary Flames in the 1993 NHL entry draft from the Brandon Wheat Kings and joined the Flames organization in 1995. He spent three seasons dividing his time between the Calgary Flames and the Saint John Flames in the AHL, playing 19 NHL games. Murray then spent two seasons playing in Europe, in 1998 he played in the Austrian Hockey League for VSV EC and then moved to Germany's Deutsche Eishockey Liga for the Kölner Haie. He then returned to Calgary in 2000, but played only seven games as he spent most of the season with Saint John.

Murray signed with the Philadelphia Flyers in 2001 where he received a lot more ice time spending almost two full seasons with the team. He was traded to the Carolina Hurricanes in 2003, spending one season with the team.

After the NHL lockout, Murray returned to Germany, spending one season with the Hannover Scorpions. Murray then re-signed with Philadelphia but remained with their AHL affiliate the Philadelphia Phantoms and was eventually claimed off waivers by the Los Angeles Kings, splitting his spell between LA and the Manchester Monarchs. Murray then signed for Swiss Nationalliga A side HC Lugano in 2007. The following year he rejoined the Monarchs for a single season prior to signing a contract with the Manitoba Moose the year after that.

== Transactions ==
- Selected by the Calgary Flames in the 4th round 96th overall during the 1993 NHL entry draft.
- Signed as a free agent by the Philadelphia Flyers, July 9, 2001.
- Traded to the Carolina Hurricanes by Philadelphia for a 2004 6th round draft pick (Frederik Cabana), June 22, 2003.
- Signed as a free agent by the Philadelphia Flyers, June 15, 2006.
- Claimed off recall waivers by the Los Angeles Kings on November 11, 2006.
- Signed to a one-year contract with the Manchester Monarchs on August 11, 2008.
- Signed as a free agent by the Manitoba Moose on August 17, 2009.
- Loaned to the Milwaukee Admirals by Manitoba in return for the loan of Peter Olvecky, on March 10, 2010.

== Awards ==
- Canadian Major Junior Second All-Star Team (1994)
- WHL East First All-Star Team (1994, 1995)
- Best Forward - World Junior Championships (1995)
- World Junior Championships First All-Star Team (1995)
- AHL Canadian All-Star team (1996)
- AHL All-Star Rookie of the Game (1996)

== Career statistics ==
=== Regular season and playoffs ===
			Regular season					Playoffs
Season	Team	League	GP	G	A	Pts	PIM	GP	G	A	Pts	PIM
1990–91	Southwest Cougars	MMHL	36	46	47	93	50	—	—	—	—	—
1991–92	Brandon Wheat Kings	WHL	68	20	36	56	22	—	—	—	—	—
1992–93	Brandon Wheat Kings	WHL	67	29	65	94	50	4	1	3	4	0
1993–94	Brandon Wheat Kings	WHL	64	43	71	114	33	14	6	14	20	14
1994–95	Brandon Wheat Kings	WHL	65	40	88	128	53	18	9	20	29	16
1995–96	Saint John Flames	AHL	58	25	31	56	20	14	2	4	6	4
1995–96	Calgary Flames	NHL	15	3	3	6	0	—	—	—	—	—
1996–97	Saint John Flames	AHL	67	19	39	58	40	5	2	3	5	4
1996–97	Calgary Flames	NHL	2	0	0	0	4	—	—	—	—	—
1997–98	Saint John Flames	AHL	41	10	30	40	16	21	10	10	20	12
1997–98	Calgary Flames	NHL	2	0	0	0	2	—	—	—	—	—
1998–99	EC VSV	AL	33	26	41	67	12	—	—	—	—	—
1998–99	EC VSV	AUT	17	13	17	30	6	6	1	4	5	0
1999–2000	Kölner Haie	DEL	56	12	47	59	28	10	4	3	7	2
2000–01	Saint John Flames	AHL	56	24	52	76	36	19	4	16	20	18
2000–01	Calgary Flames	NHL	7	0	0	0	0	—	—	—	—	—
2001–02	Philadelphia Flyers	NHL	73	12	15	27	10	5	0	1	1	0
2001–02	Philadelphia Phantoms	AHL	3	0	3	3	2	—	—	—	—	—
2002–03	Philadelphia Flyers	NHL	76	11	15	26	13	4	0	0	0	4
2003–04	Carolina Hurricanes	NHL	66	5	7	12	8	—	—	—	—	—
2005–06	Hannover Scorpions	DEL	24	7	22	29	16	9	4	3	7	35
2006–07	Philadelphia Phantoms	AHL	11	2	13	15	4	—	—	—	—	—
2006–07	Los Angeles Kings	NHL	19	0	2	2	4	—	—	—	—	—
2006–07	Manchester Monarchs	AHL	34	12	28	40	24	16	6	8	14	11
2007–08	HC Lugano	NLA	49	7	25	32	22	—	—	—	—	—
2008–09	Manchester Monarchs	AHL	76	15	39	54	37	—	—	—	—	—
2009–10	Manitoba Moose	AHL	59	10	20	30	26	—	—	—	—	—
2009–10	Milwaukee Admirals	AHL	15	5	5	10	10	7	2	3	5	2
AHL totals			420	122	264	386	215	82	26	44	70	51
NHL totals			261	31	42	73	41	9	0	1	1	4

=== International ===
Medal record

Representing Canada

Ice hockey

Spengler Cup
Gold medal – first place	2007 Davos	

Representing Canada

IIHF World U20 Championship
Gold medal – first place	1994 Czech Republic	
Gold medal – first place	1995 Canada	

Year	Team	Event	GP	G	A	Pts	PIM
1994	Canada	WJC	7	1	3	4	0
1995	Canada	WJC	7	6	9	15	0
Junior totals			14	7	12	19	0

Preceded by Sonny Mignacca	Winner of the WHL Four Broncos Memorial Trophy; 1995	Succeeded by Jarome Iginla
