= 1993–94 WHL season =

Junior ice hockey season

- League: Western Hockey League
- Sport: Ice hockey
- Teams: 16

Regular season
- Scotty Munro Memorial Trophy: Kamloops Blazers (6)
- Season MVP: Sonny Mignacca (Medicine Hat Tigers)
- Top scorer: Lonny Bohonos (Portland Winter Hawks)

Playoffs
- Playoffs MVP: Steve Passmore (Blazers)
- Finals champions: Kamloops Blazers (5)
- Runners-up: Saskatoon Blades

WHL seasons
- 1992–93 1994–95

1993–94 CHL season
- League: Canadian Hockey League
- Sport: Ice hockey
- Teams: 45

OHL

QMJHL

WHL

Memorial Cup
- Finals champions: Kamloops Blazers (WHL) (2nd title)
- Runners-up: Laval Titan (QMJHL)

The 1993–94 WHL season was the 28th season of the Western Hockey League (WHL). Sixteen teams completed a 72-game season. The Kamloops Blazers won their sixth Scotty Munro Memorial Trophy for best regular season record. In the playoffs, the Blazers defeated the Saskatoon Blades in a re-match of the 1991–92 championship series, claiming their fifth President's Cup and a berth in the 1994 Memorial Cup tournament. The Blazers went on to win their second Memorial Cup title in three seasons.

== Regular season ==
=== Final standings ===
East Division
Pos	Team	Pld	W	L	T	GF	GA	Pts
1	x – Saskatoon Blades	72	49	22	1	326	229	99
2	x – Brandon Wheat Kings	72	42	25	5	291	251	89
3	x – Lethbridge Hurricanes	72	35	32	5	306	317	75
4	x – Swift Current Broncos	72	35	33	4	284	258	74
5	x – Medicine Hat Tigers	72	33	33	6	263	264	72
6	x – Red Deer Rebels	72	35	36	1	310	334	71
7	x – Regina Pats	72	34	36	2	308	341	70
8	Prince Albert Raiders	72	31	37	4	326	321	66
9	Moose Jaw Warriors	72	21	48	3	269	361	45

x – qualified for playoffs

West Division
Pos	Team	Pld	W	L	T	GF	GA	Pts
1	x – Kamloops Blazers	72	50	16	6	381	225	106
2	x – Portland Winter Hawks	72	49	22	1	392	260	99
3	x – Tacoma Rockets	72	33	34	5	303	301	71
4	x – Seattle Thunderbirds	72	32	37	3	283	312	67
5	x – Spokane Chiefs	72	31	37	4	324	320	66
6	x – Tri-City Americans	72	19	48	5	272	373	43
7	Victoria Cougars	72	18	51	3	222	393	39

x – qualified for playoffs

=== Scoring leaders ===
Note: GP = Games played; G = Goals; A = Assists; Pts = Points; PIM = Penalties in minutes

Player	Team	GP	G	A	Pts	PIM
Lonny Bohonos	Portland Winter Hawks	70	62	90	152	80
Darcy Tucker	Kamloops Blazers	66	52	88	140	143
Domenic Pittis	Lethbridge Hurricanes	72	58	69	127	93
Ryan Duthie	Spokane Chiefs	71	57	69	126	111
Allan Egeland	Tacoma Rockets	70	47	76	123	204
John Varga	Tacoma Rockets	65	60	62	122	122
Stacy Roest	Medicine Hat Tigers	72	48	72	120	48
Craig Reicher	Red Deer Rebels	72	52	67	119	153
Jeff Friesen	Regina Pats	66	51	67	118	48
Maxim Bets	Spokane Chiefs	63	46	70	116	111

== 1994 WHL Playoffs ==
First round
E1	Saskatoon	bye
E4	Swift Current	3
E5	Medicine Hat	0
E2	Brandon	3
E7	Regina	1
E3	Lethbridge	3
E6	Red Deer	1
W1	Kamloops	bye
W4	Seattle	3
W5	Spokane	1
W2	Portland	bye
W3	Tacoma	3
W6	Tri-City	1

Division Semi-Finals
E1	Saskatoon	4
E4	Swift Current	0
E2	Brandon	4
E3	Lethbridge	1
W1	Kamloops	4
W4	Seattle	2
W2	Portland	4
W3	Tacoma	0

Division Finals
E1	Saskatoon	4
E2	Brandon	1
W1	Kamloops	4
W2	Portland	2

WHL Championship
E1	Saskatoon	3
W1	Kamloops	4

== All-Star game ==
On February 1, a combined WHL/OHL All-Star team defeated the QMJHL All-Stars 9–7 at Moncton, New Brunswick before a crowd of 6,380.

== WHL awards ==
Most Valuable Player - Four Broncos Memorial Trophy: Sonny Mignacca, Medicine Hat Tigers
Scholastic Player of the Year - Daryl K. (Doc) Seaman Trophy: Byron Penstock, Brandon Wheat Kings
Top Scorer - Bob Clarke Trophy: Lonny Bohonos, Portland Winter Hawks
Most Sportsmanlike Player - Brad Hornung Trophy: Lonny Bohonos, Portland Winter Hawks
Top Defenseman - Bill Hunter Trophy: Brendan Witt, Seattle Thunderbirds
Rookie of the Year - Jim Piggott Memorial Trophy: Wade Redden, Brandon Wheat Kings
Top Goaltender - Del Wilson Trophy: Norm Maracle, Saskatoon Blades
Coach of the Year - Dunc McCallum Memorial Trophy: Lorne Molleken, Saskatoon Blades
Executive of the Year - Lloyd Saunders Memorial Trophy: Bob Brown, Kamloops Blazers
Regular season champions - Scotty Munro Memorial Trophy: Kamloops Blazers
Marketing/Public Relations Award - St. Clair Group Trophy: Mark Miller, Portland Winter Hawks
WHL Humanitarian of the Year Award - Jason Widmer, Lethbridge Hurricanes
WHL Plus-Minus Award: Mark Wotton, Saskatoon Blades
WHL Playoff Most Valuable Player: Steve Passmore, Kamloops Blazers

== All-Star teams ==
East Division
	First Team		Second Team	
Goal	Norm Maracle	Saskatoon Blades	Sonny Mignacca	Medicine Hat Tigers
Defense	Darren Van Impe	Red Deer Rebels	Nathan Dempsey	Regina Pats
Defense	Chris Armstrong	Moose Jaw Warriors	Mark Wotton	Saskatoon Blades
Forward	Rick Girard	Swift Current Broncos	Andy MacIntyre	Saskatoon Blades
Forward	Stacy Roest	Medicine Hat Tigers	Denis Pederson	Prince Albert Raiders
Forward	Marty Murray	Brandon Wheat Kings	Domenic Pittis	Lethbridge Hurricanes
West Division
	First Team		Second Team	
Goal	Steve Passmore	Kamloops Blazers	Scott Langkow	Portland Winter Hawks
Defense	Brendan Witt	Seattle Thunderbirds	Brandon Smith	Portland Winter Hawks
Defense	Bryan McCabe	Spokane Chiefs	Alexander Alexeev	Tacoma Rockets
Defense	-	-	Scott Ferguson	Kamloops Blazers
Forward	Ryan Duthie	Spokane Chiefs	Valeri Bure	Spokane Chiefs
Forward	Darcy Tucker	Kamloops Blazers	Allan Egeland	Tacoma Rockets
Forward	Lonny Bohonos	Portland Winter Hawks	John Varga	Tacoma Rockets

== See also ==
- 1994 NHL entry draft
- 1993 in sports
- 1994 in sports

Preceded by 1992–93 WHL season	WHL seasons	Succeeded by 1994–95 WHL season
