= Steve Passmore =

Canadian ice hockey player (born 1973)

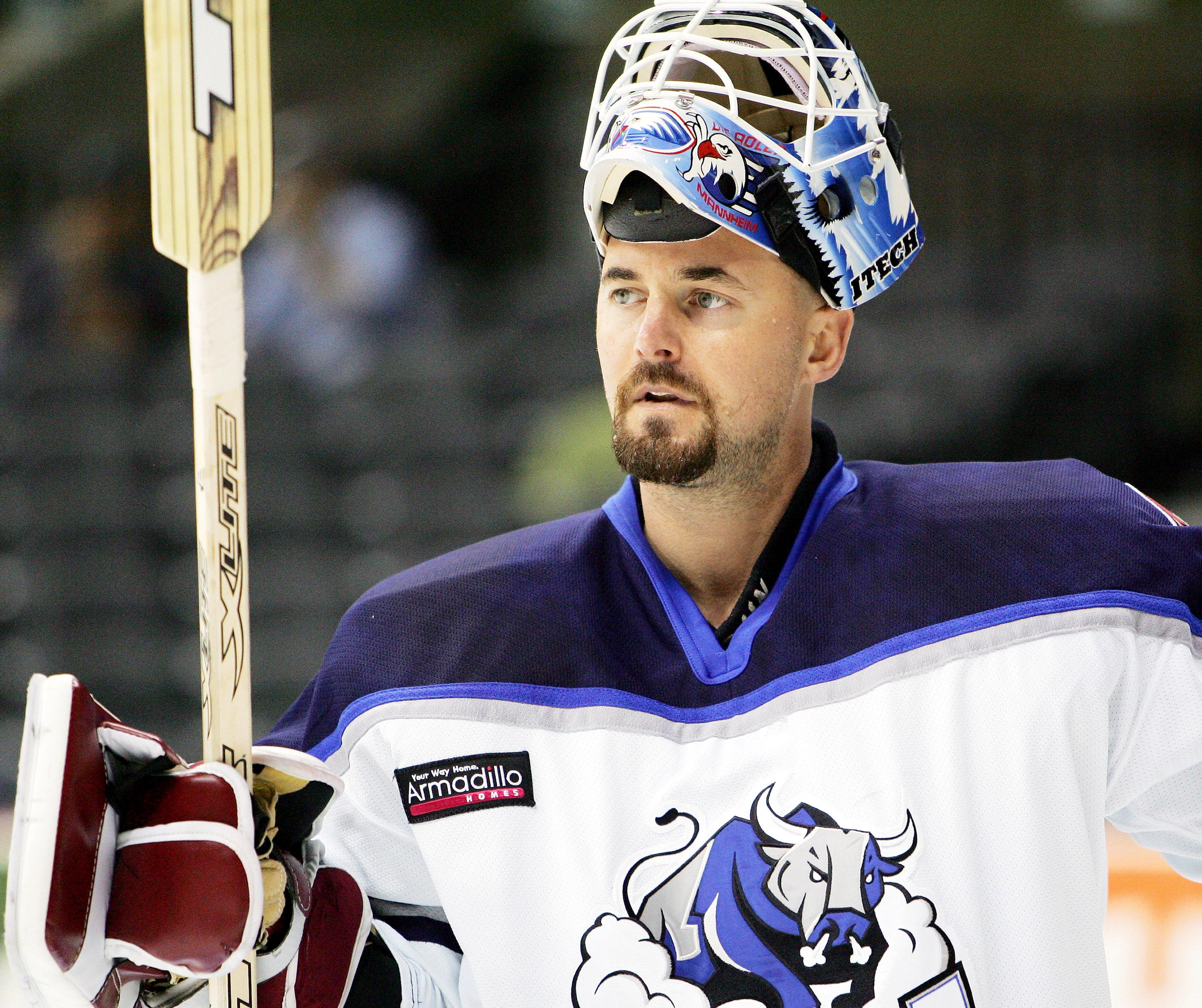
- Passmore with the San Antonio Rampage in 2005
- Born: January 29, 1973 (age 53) Thunder Bay, Ontario, Canada
- Height: 5 ft 9 in (175 cm)
- Weight: 170 lb (77 kg; 12 st 2 lb)
- Position: Goaltender
- Shot: Left
- Played for: Edmonton Oilers; Chicago Blackhawks; Los Angeles Kings; Adler Mannheim; Jokerit; Graz 99ers Milano Vipers
- NHL draft: 196th overall, 1992; Quebec Nordiques
- Playing career: 1994–2007

Steve Passmore (born January 29, 1973) is a Canadian former professional ice hockey goaltender. He was drafted by the Quebec Nordiques as their ninth-round pick in the 1992 NHL entry draft. He played 93 games in the NHL between 1998 and 2004 with the Edmonton Oilers, Chicago Blackhawks, and Los Angeles Kings. The rest of his career, which lasted from 1994 to 2007, was spent in the minor leagues and Europe.

== Playing career ==
As a member of the Victoria Cougars in the 1991–92 season, Passmore set Western Hockey League single season records for most games by a goaltender (71), minutes played (4,228) and most saves (2,562).

After finishing his major junior career with the Kamloops Blazers, Passmore was traded by the Nordiques on March 21, 1994, to the Edmonton Oilers in exchange for Brad Werenka. In his second season within the Oilers organization, Passmore was limited to just two games with affiliate, the Cape Breton Oilers after he was diagnosed with a career-threatening case of heavy metal poisoning.

Upon recovery, Passmore spent most of his career in the AHL and as a backup goaltender in the NHL. He was nominated for the NHL's Masterton Trophy by the Chicago Blackhawks in 2000 for his return from his blood disease.

During the 2004–05 NHL lockout he played for Adler Mannheim in the Deutsche Eishockey Liga, and in November 2005 he signed with Jokerit in the Finnish SM-liiga to replace Karl Goehring, but Passmore was also a disappointment, and was eventually replaced by Tom Askey. After a short stint with an Austrian club. Graz 99ers in January 2007, he was signed by HCJ Milano Vipers of the Italian Serie A, where he would end his professional career.

Passmore now lives in Kamloops, British Columbia.

== Career statistics ==
=== Regular season and playoffs ===
			Regular season										Playoffs
Season	Team	League	GP	W	L	T	OTL	MIN	GA	SO	GAA	SV%	GP	W	L	MIN	GA	SO	GAA	SV%
1988–89	Tri-City Americans	WHL	1	0	1	0	—	60	6	0	6.00	.850	—	—	—	—	—	—	—	—
1989–90	Tri-City Americans	WHL	4	2	1	0	—	215	17	0	4.74	.843	—	—	—	—	—	—	—	—
1989–90	Merritt Centennials	BCHL	10	2	7	0	—	489	52	0	6.38	.816	—	—	—	—	—	—	—	—
1990–91	Victoria Cougars	WHL	35	3	25	1	—	1838	190	0	6.20	.847	—	—	—	—	—	—	—	—
1991–92	Victoria Cougars	WHL	71	15	50	5	—	4228	347	0	4.92	.881	—	—	—	—	—	—	—	—
1992–93	Victoria Cougars	WHL	43	14	24	2	—	2402	150	1	3.75	.896	—	—	—	—	—	—	—	—
1992–93	Kamloops Blazers	WHL	25	19	6	0	—	1479	69	1	2.80	.918	7	4	2	401	22	1	3.29	.906
1993–94	Kamloops Blazers	WHL	36	22	9	2	—	1927	88	1	2.74	.909	18	11	7	1099	60	0	3.28	.900
1993–94	Kamloops Blazers	M-Cup	—	—	—	—	—	—	—	—	—	—	4	4	0	240	8	1	2.00	—
1994–95	Cape Breton Oilers	AHL	25	8	13	3	—	1455	93	0	3.83	.890	—	—	—	—	—	—	—	—
1995–96	Cape Breton Oilers	AHL	2	1	0	0	—	90	2	0	1.33	.964	—	—	—	—	—	—	—	—
1996–97	Hamilton Bulldogs	AHL	27	12	12	3	—	1568	70	1	2.68	.901	22	12	10	1325	61	2	2.76	.911
1996–97	Raleigh Icecaps	ECHL	2	1	1	0	—	118	13	0	6.56	.827	—	—	—	—	—	—	—	—
1997–98	San Antonio Dragons	IHL	14	3	8	2	—	736	56	0	4.56	.878	—	—	—	—	—	—	—	—
1997–98	Hamilton Bulldogs	AHL	27	11	10	6	—	1655	87	2	3.15	.900	3	0	2	132	14	0	6.33	.803
1998–99	Edmonton Oilers	NHL	6	1	4	1	—	362	17	0	2.82	.907	—	—	—	—	—	—	—	—
1998–99	Hamilton Bulldogs	AHL	54	24	21	7	—	3148	117	4	2.23	.929	11	5	6	680	31	0	2.74	.919
1999–00	Chicago Blackhawks	NHL	24	7	12	3	—	1388	63	1	2.72	.904	—	—	—	—	—	—	—	—
1999–00	Cleveland Lumberjacks	IHL	2	1	0	1	—	120	3	1	1.50	.942	—	—	—	—	—	—	—	—
2000–01	Los Angeles Kings	NHL	14	3	8	1	—	718	37	1	3.09	.881	—	—	—	—	—	—	—	—
2000–01	Chicago Blackhawks	NHL	6	0	4	1	—	340	14	0	2.47	.905	—	—	—	—	—	—	—	—
2000–01	Lowell Lock Monsters	AHL	6	2	4	0	—	334	24	0	4.32	.848	—	—	—	—	—	—	—	—
2000–01	Chicago Wolves	IHL	6	2	2	2	—	340	22	0	3.88	.895	—	—	—	—	—	—	—	—
2001–02	Chicago Blackhawks	NHL	23	8	5	4	—	1142	43	0	2.26	.904	3	0	2	138	6	0	2.62	.903
2001–02	Norfolk Admirals	AHL	2	2	0	0	—	120	6	0	3.00	.915	—	—	—	—	—	—	—	—
2002–03	Chicago Blackhawks	NHL	11	2	5	2	—	617	38	0	3.70	.866	—	—	—	—	—	—	—	—
2002–03	Norfolk Admirals	AHL	14	4	7	2	—	832	33	2	2.38	.906	—	—	—	—	—	—	—	—
2003–04	Chicago Blackhawks	NHL	9	2	6	0	—	478	23	0	2.89	.896	—	—	—	—	—	—	—	—
2003–04	Norfolk Admirals	AHL	15	3	10	2	—	889	39	2	2.63	.899	—	—	—	—	—	—	—	—
2004–05	Adler Mannheim	DEL	21	—	—	—	—	1110	48	0	2.59	.916	—	—	—	—	—	—	—	—
2005–06	San Antonio Rampage	AHL	11	4	6	—	0	621	37	0	3.58	.889	—	—	—	—	—	—	—	—
2005–06	Jokerit	FIN	15	5	8	—	0	830	50	1	3.61	.891	—	—	—	—	—	—	—	—
2006–07	Graz 99ers	EBEL	20	3	15	—	0	—	—	—	4.42	.881	—	—	—	—	—	—	—	—
2006–07	Milano Vipers	ITA	7	—	—	—	—	—	—	—	2.80	.907	9	—	—	—	—	—	2.40	.924
NHL totals			93	23	44	12	—	5046	235	2	2.79	.895	3	0	2	138	6	0	2.62	.903

== Awards ==
- WHL West First All-Star Team – 1993 & 1994
