= Allan Egeland =

Canadian ice hockey player

- Born: January 31, 1973 (age 53) Lethbridge, Alberta, Canada
- Height: 6 ft 0 in (183 cm)
- Weight: 184 lb (83 kg; 13 st 2 lb)
- Position: Centre
- Shot: Left
- Played for: Tampa Bay Lightning
- NHL draft: 55th overall, 1993; Tampa Bay Lightning
- Playing career: 1994–2005

Allan Egeland (born January 31, 1973) is a Canadian former professional ice hockey centre. He was drafted in the third round, 55th overall, by the Tampa Bay Lightning in the 1993 NHL entry draft. Egeland was born in Lethbridge, Alberta.

== Playing career ==
Egeland played 17 games in the National Hockey League, all with the Lightning, scoring no points. Allan Egeland also played with the Orlando Solar Bears during the 1998-99 season. He was a strong fighter for the team.

After his playing career, Egeland became an assistant coach with the Charlotte Checkers of the ECHL.

== Personal life ==
Egeland met his wife, Holly, in 1995. They were married in 2001. The couple has two children named Parker and Noah.

== Career statistics ==
=== Regular season and playoffs ===
			Regular season					Playoffs
Season	Team	League	GP	G	A	Pts	PIM	GP	G	A	Pts	PIM
1990–91	Lethbridge Hurricanes	WHL	67	2	16	18	57	9	0	0	0	0
1991–92	Tacoma Rockets	WHL	72	35	39	74	135	4	0	1	1	18
1992–93	Tacoma Rockets	WHL	71	56	57	113	119	7	9	7	16	18
1993–94	Tacoma Rockets	WHL	70	47	76	123	204	8	5	3	8	26
1994–95	Atlanta Knights	IHL	60	8	16	24	112	5	0	1	1	16
1995–96	Atlanta Knights	IHL	68	22	22	44	182	3	0	1	1	0
1995–96	Tampa Bay Lightning	NHL	5	0	0	0	2	—	—	—	—	—
1996–97	Adirondack Red Wings	AHL	52	18	32	50	184	2	0	1	1	4
1996–97	Tampa Bay Lightning	NHL	4	0	0	0	5	—	—	—	—	—
1997–98	Adirondack Red Wings	AHL	35	11	22	33	78	3	0	2	2	10
1997–98	Tampa Bay Lightning	NHL	8	0	0	0	9	—	—	—	—	—
1998–99	Orlando Solar Bears	ECHL	62	7	23	30	182	—	—	—	—	—
1998–99	Saint John Flames	AHL	14	5	5	10	49	7	1	4	5	21
1999–00	Saint John Flames	AHL	11	1	5	6	42	—	—	—	—	—
1999–00	Long Beach Ice Dogs	IHL	47	4	12	16	104	6	0	0	0	19
2000–01	Cleveland Lumberjacks	IHL	10	0	3	3	19	—	—	—	—	—
2000–01	Pensacola Ice Pilots	ECHL	59	18	42	60	186	—	—	—	—	—
2001–02	Cincinnati Cyclones	ECHL	71	18	35	53	235	2	0	0	0	19
2002–03	Cincinnati Cyclones	ECHL	72	20	41	61	191	—	—	—	—	—
2003–04	Cincinnati Cyclones	ECHL	63	16	30	46	185	—	—	—	—	—
2004–05	Cincinnati Cyclones	ECHL	4	0	2	2	13	—	—	—	—	—
NHL totals			17	0	0	0	16	—	—	—	—	—

== Awards ==
- WHL West First All-Star Team – 1993
- WHL West Second All-Star Team – 1994
