= Rick Girard =

Canadian ice hockey player

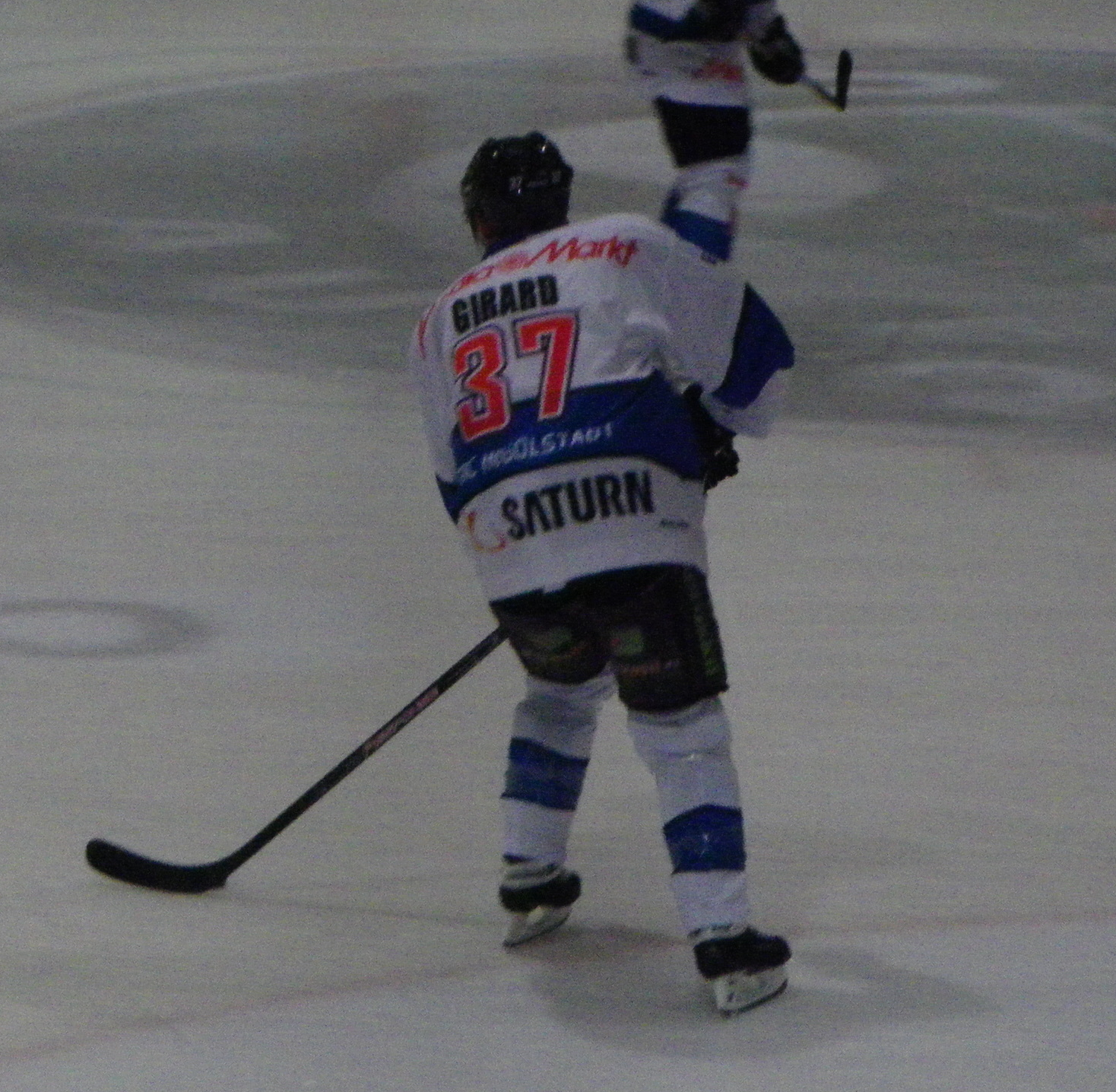
- Born: May 1, 1974 (age 52) Edmonton, Alberta, Canada
- Height: 5 ft 10 in (178 cm)
- Weight: 174 lb (79 kg; 12 st 6 lb)
- Position: Forward
- Shot: Left
- Played for: Hamilton Canucks; Syracuse Crunch; Manitoba Moose; Quebec Rafales; Cleveland Lumberjacks; Kaufbeurer Adler; Augsburger Panther; SERC Wild Wings; München Barons; Frankfurt Lions; Adler Mannheim; ERC Ingolstadt
- National team: Canada
- NHL draft: 46th overall, 1993; Vancouver Canucks
- Playing career: 1994–2012

Rick Girard (born May 1, 1974) is a Canadian former professional ice hockey player.

Girard was selected by the Vancouver Canucks in the 2nd round (46th overall) of the 1993 NHL entry draft but never played in the NHL. He spent the majority of his career in the Deutsche Eishockey Liga in Germany, playing for the Kaufbeurer Adler, Augsburger Panther, SERC Wild Wings, München Barons, Frankfurt Lions, Adler Mannheim and ERC Ingolstadt.

== Career statistics ==
			Regular season					Playoffs
Season	Team	League	GP	G	A	Pts	PIM	GP	G	A	Pts	PIM
1990–91	Swift Current Broncos	WHL	—	—	—	—	—	1	0	0	0	0
1991–92	Swift Current Broncos	WHL	45	14	17	31	6	8	2	0	2	2
1992–93	Swift Current Broncos	WHL	72	71	70	141	25	17	9	17	26	10
1993–94	Swift Current Broncos	WHL	58	40	49	89	43	7	1	8	9	6
1993–94	Hamilton Canucks	AHL	1	1	1	2	0	—	—	—	—	—
1994–95	Syracuse Crunch	AHL	26	10	13	23	22	—	—	—	—	—
1995–96	Syracuse Crunch	AHL	67	15	21	36	32	16	9	8	17	16
1996–97	Syracuse Crunch	AHL	66	19	28	47	20	1	1	1	2	2
1997–98	Manitoba Moose	IHL	18	4	2	6	2	—	—	—	—	—
1997–98	Quebec Rafales	IHL	35	7	10	17	15	—	—	—	—	—
1997–98	Cleveland Lumberjacks	IHL	5	1	2	3	10	3	0	0	0	0
1997–98	Kaufbeurer Adler	DEL	14	3	7	10	4	—	—	—	—	—
1998–99	Augsburger Panther	DEL	49	18	21	39	22	5	1	3	4	2
1999–00	SERC Wild Wings	DEL	55	23	27	50	38	—	—	—	—	—
2000–01	München Barons	DEL	58	23	25	48	40	10	5	8	13	4
2001–02	Frankfurt Lions	DEL	57	11	27	38	38	—	—	—	—	—
2002–03	Frankfurt Lions	DEL	48	12	18	30	18	—	—	—	—	—
2003–04	Augsburger Panther	DEL	40	11	24	35	49	—	—	—	—	—
2004–05	Augsburger Panther	DEL	52	10	28	38	38	5	2	1	3	2
2005–06	Augsburger Panther	DEL	43	15	29	44	63	—	—	—	—	—
2006–07	Adler Mannheim	DEL	42	9	11	20	8	11	2	7	9	4
2007–08	Adler Mannheim	DEL	48	13	21	34	10	4	1	0	1	2
2008–09	Adler Mannheim	DEL	39	4	11	15	10	9	0	4	4	12
2009–10	ERC Ingolstadt	DEL	50	11	28	39	32	9	3	4	7	0
2010–11	ERC Ingolstadt	DEL	31	11	14	25	18	4	2	0	2	0
2011–12	ERC Ingolstadt	DEL	49	11	17	28	51	9	5	2	7	14
AHL totals			160	45	63	108	74	17	10	9	19	18
DEL totals			675	185	308	493	439	82	31	42	73	76

== Awards ==
- WHL East First All-Star Team – 1993 & 1994
