= Jerry Engele =

Canadian ice hockey player

- Born: November 26, 1950 (age 74); Carmel, Saskatchewan, Canada
- Height: 6 ft 0 in (183 cm)
- Weight: 190 lb (86 kg; 13 st 8 lb)
- Position: Defence
- Shot: Left
- Played for: Minnesota North Stars
- Playing career: 1966–1979

Jerome Wilfred Engele (born November 26, 1950) is a Canadian former professional ice hockey defenceman who scored 2 goals and played 100 games in the National Hockey League for the Minnesota North Stars between 1975 and 1978. He was the head coach of the Saskatoon Blades from 1979 to 1980.

== Career statistics ==
=== Regular season and playoffs ===
			Regular season					Playoffs
Season	Team	League	GP	G	A	Pts	PIM	GP	G	A	Pts	PIM
1966–67	Saskatoon Blades	CMJHL	54	1	9	10	162	7	0	0	0	0
1967–68	Saskatoon Blades	WCHL	58	0	11	11	153	7	1	1	2	15
1968–69	Saskatoon Blades	WCHL	52	0	9	9	155	4	0	0	0	0
1969–70	Saskatoon Blades	WCHL	36	0	7	7	164	5	0	2	2	29
1970–71	Saskatoon Blades	WCHL	63	2	21	23	181	—	—	—	—	—
1971–72	St. Petersburg Suns	EHL	72	6	16	22	110	6	1	1	2	19
1972–73	Suncoast Suns	EHL	72	7	33	40	171	2	0	0	0	0
1972–73	Greensboro Generals	EHL	—	—	—	—	—	2	0	0	0	0
1973–74	Saginaw Gears	IHL	71	1	27	28	150	13	2	5	7	10
1974–75	New Haven Nighthawks	AHL	75	1	21	22	182	9	0	3	3	44
1975–76	New Haven Nighthawks	AHL	58	1	20	21	232	3	1	0	1	6
1975–76	Minnesota North Stars	NHL	17	0	1	1	16	—	—	—	—	—
1976–77	New Haven Nighthawks	AHL	52	2	10	12	84	—	—	—	—	—
1976–77	Minnesota North Stars	NHL	31	1	7	8	41	2	0	1	1	0
1977–78	Minnesota North Stars	NHL	52	1	5	6	105	—	—	—	—	—
1977–78	Fort Worth Texans	CHL	3	0	0	0	2	—	—	—	—	—
1978–79	Nova Scotia Voyageurs	AHL	75	4	24	28	186	9	0	2	2	13
NHL totals			100	2	13	15	162	2	0	1	1	0
