= Jason Krywulak =

- Born: January 29, 1972 (age 53); Prince Albert, Saskatchewan, Canada
- Height: 5 ft 11 in (180 cm)
- Weight: 160 lb (73 kg; 11 st 6 lb)
- Position: Forward
- Shot: Right
- Played for: San Diego Gulls; EC Timmendorfer Strand; EHC Straubing; EHC Neuwied
- Playing career: 1998–2000

Jason Krywulak (born January 29, 1972) is a Canadian retired professional ice hockey and inline hockey player.

== Playing career ==
Krywulak played major junior in the Western Hockey League (WHL) with the Medicine Hat Tigers and Swift Current Broncos, winning the Four Broncos Memorial Trophy as player of the year in 1993. His 162 points led the WHL and CHL in scoring to earn the Bob Clarke Trophy and CHL Top Scorer Award. After a four-year WHL career, Krywulak began a three-year stint with the University of Calgary in the Canada West Universities Athletic Association (CWUAA). During this time, he also joined short-lived Roller Hockey International (RHI) league, where he played for four seasons with the Calgary Radz, San Diego Barracudas, Oakland Skates and Sacramento River Rats.

Krywulak turned pro during the 1997–98 season, playing in 3 games with the San Diego Gulls of the minor professional West Coast Hockey League (WCHL). The following season, he went overseas to play in the now-defunct German 1st league with EC Timmendorfer Strand. He led the team in scoring with 116 points in 49 games. He then split the 1999–00 season between EHC Straubing of the German Oberliga and EHC Neuwied of the 2nd Bundesliga before retiring.

== Awards ==
- Won the Four Broncos Memorial Trophy in 1993
- Won the Bob Clarke Trophy in 1993
- WHL East First All-Star Team – 1993
- Won the CHL Top Scorer Award in 1993
- Named to the Canadian Hockey League (CHL) Second All-Star Team in 1993

== Career statistics ==
			Regular season					Playoffs
Season	Team	League	GP	G	A	Pts	PIM	GP	G	A	Pts	PIM
1989–90	Medicine Hat Tigers	WHL	70	18	26	44	51	3	2	0	2	4
1990–91	Medicine Hat Tigers	WHL	70	32	52	84	57	12	6	4	10	6
1991–92	Swift Current Broncos	WHL	72	43	59	102	70	8	4	8	12	6
1992–93	Swift Current Broncos	WHL	72	81	81	162	58	17	15	22	37	24
1992–93	Swift Current Broncos	WHL	—	—	—	—	—	4	2	2	4	2
1993–94	Calgary Dinosaurs	CWUAA	28	21	22	43	22	—	—	—	—	—
1994–95	Calgary Dinosaurs	CWUAA	28	19	24	43	32	—	—	—	—	—
1995–96	Calgary Dinosaurs	CWUAA	28	24	32	56	22	—	—	—	—	—
1997–98	San Diego Gulls	WCHL	3	1	2	3	2	—	—	—	—	—
1997–98	Calgary Dinosaurs	CWUAA	28	29	33	62	—	—	—	—	—	—
1998–99	EHC Timmendorfer Strand 06	DEU III	36	45	59	104	70	—	—	—	—	—
1999–2000	EHC Straubing	DEU III	8	2	5	7	2	—	—	—	—	—
1999–2000	EHC Neuwied	DEU II	15	6	10	16	6	—	—	—	—	—
1999–2000	Edson Ice	NCHL	16	4	9	13	98	—	—	—	—	—
2000–01	Edson Ice	NCHL	7	0	1	1	95	—	—	—	—	—
WHL totals			284	174	218	392	236	40	27	34	61	40
