= Lonny Bohonos =

Canadian ice hockey player

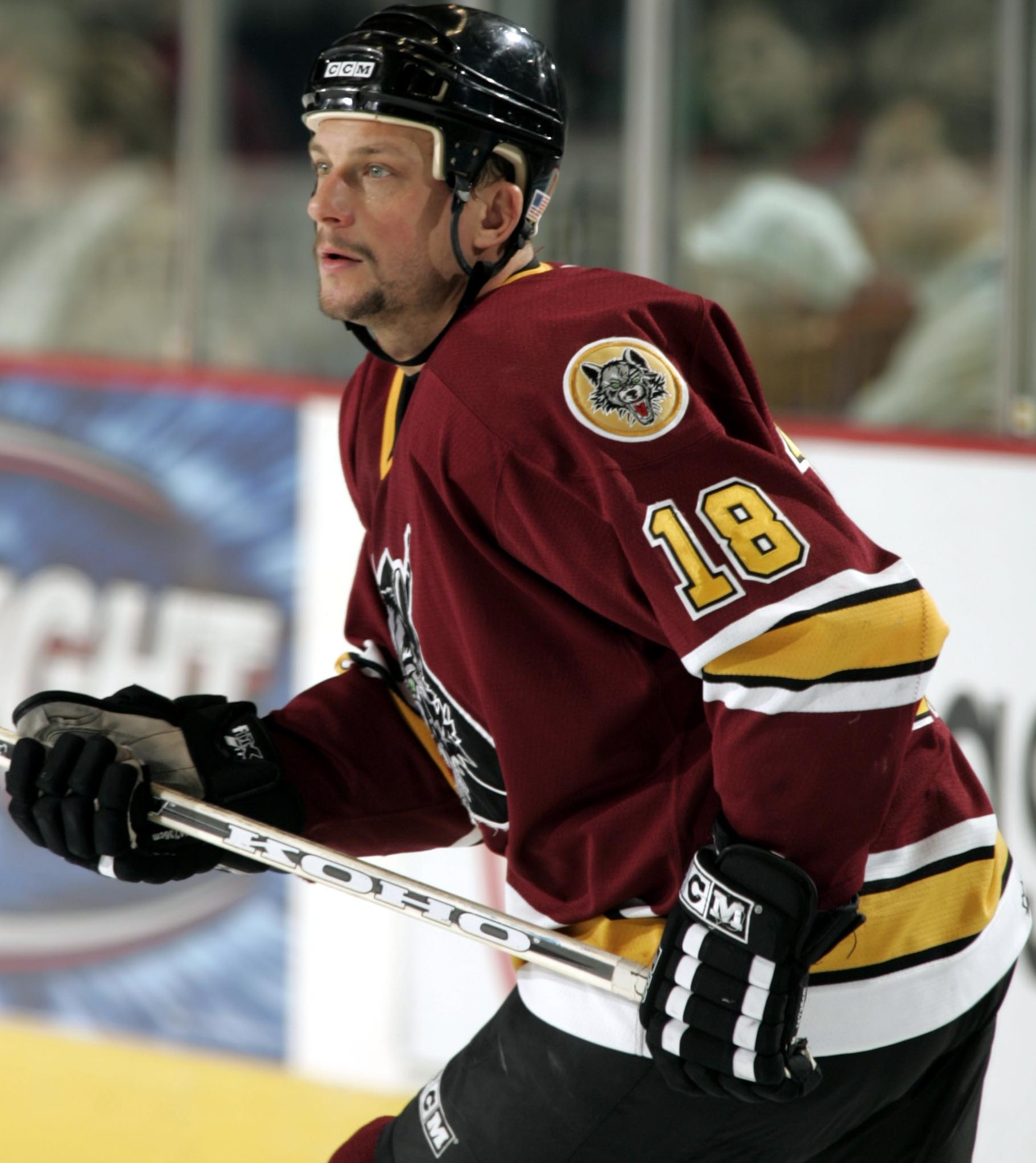
- Bohonos with the Chicago Wolves in 2004
- Born: May 20, 1973 (age 53) Winnipeg, Manitoba, Canada
- Height: 5 ft 11 in (180 cm)
- Weight: 190 lb (86 kg; 13 st 8 lb)
- Position: Right wing
- Shot: Right
- Played for: Vancouver Canucks; Toronto Maple Leafs; HC Davos; ZSC Lions; Adler Mannheim
- NHL draft: Undrafted
- Playing career: 1994–2006

Lonny W. Bohonos (born May 20, 1973) is a Canadian former professional ice hockey right winger. He played most notably for the Vancouver Canucks of the National Hockey League and also appeared in several games for the Toronto Maple Leafs. In the later stages of his career, he played overseas in the Swiss Nationalliga A and Deutsche Eishockey Liga.

He served as the head coach of the Fort William North Stars, a Thunder Bay team in the SIJHL during the 2011–12 season.

== Playing career ==
Bohonos was born in Winnipeg, Manitoba. As a youth, he played in the 1987 Quebec International Pee-Wee Hockey Tournament with the Winnipeg South Monarchs minor ice hockey team.

Bohonos played major junior in the Western Hockey League for the Moose Jaw Warriors, Seattle Thunderbirds and Portland Winter Hawks. After a 63-point season in 1992–93 split between Seattle and Portland, Bohonos dramatically rose to a league-leading 62 goals, 90 assists, and 152 points the following season. In addition to the Bob Clarke Trophy as the league's leading scorer, Bohonos was also awarded the Brad Hornung Trophy as the most sportsmanlike player.

Unselected in the NHL entry draft, Bohonos' successful final year with the Portland Winter Hawks earned him an NHL contract from the Vancouver Canucks. He turned pro in 1994–95 with Vancouver's AHL affiliate, the Syracuse Crunch. Bohonos scored the first goal in Syracuse Crunch history, and quickly established himself as an offensive threat, scoring 75 points in his rookie season. The following year, he led Syracuse in goals and points, and earned a three-game callup to the NHL, recording an assist.

However, he was considered a very one-dimensional player, and his NHL potential was questioned as a result. These criticisms dogged him throughout his career - while Bohonos had the unquestionable skill and natural hockey sense as well as an excellent touch around the net, his defensive game, and intangibles were considered below par. Bohonos was also ripped by analysts and scouts as being a "lazy" player.

He continued to produce in the AHL in 1996–97 and finally earned his big break around mid-season with an extended call-up to the Canucks. In a disappointing year for the team, Bohonos was a bright light in the second half, playing well on a scoring line with Trevor Linden and Martin Gelinas, and finishing with 11 goals and 22 points in 36 games.

The following season, however, was a huge disappointment. While he cracked the Canucks' NHL roster out of training camp for the first time, he was used predominantly on the team's fourth line in a checking role for which he was ill-suited. After recording only 3 points in 31 games and being returned to the AHL, Bohonos was dealt to the Toronto Maple Leafs for Brandon Convery in an exchange of struggling talents. He again showcased his talent in a late-season call-up, putting up 6 points in 6 games for the Leafs.

The 1998–99 season saw him back in the AHL, where he led the Maple Leafs' AHL affiliate, the St. John's Maple Leafs, in scoring. In 7 games with Toronto, Bohonos again produced, scoring three goals. The highlight of his career, though, would come in the 1999 Stanley Cup Playoffs. With Igor Korolev and Fredrik Modin injured, and Derek King struggling, Bohonos was recalled and allowed to skate on a scoring line with Mats Sundin. He responded in style, putting up 3 goals and 6 assists in 9 games to help Toronto to the Conference Finals.

After a year in the IHL with the Manitoba Moose, Bohonos left North America to sign with Davos HC in the Switzerland. He became one of the top players in the Nationalliga A, leading the league in scoring with 60 points in 2000–01. That same year, he won a Spengler Cup with Davos, defeating Canada in the final. He spent another year with Davos and was the Spengler Cup runner-up in 2002, then joined the ZSC Lions.

Bohonos returned to North America to spend the 2004–05 season with the Chicago Wolves, but again went back to Europe for the 2005–06 season, this time with the Adler Mannheim in the German Deutsche Eishockey Liga. In November 2005, he suffered a serious neck injury in a collision with Denis Pederson of Berlin and was sidelined for the year. He was expected to make a full recovery for the 2006–07 season, but had to end his career, due to problems resulting from the injury.

== Career statistics ==
			Regular season					Playoffs
Season	Team	League	GP	G	A	Pts	PIM	GP	G	A	Pts	PIM
1990–91	Winnipeg South Blues	MJHL	46	33	22	55	70	—	—	—	—	—
1991–92	Winnipeg South Blues	MJHL	40	53	36	89	42	—	—	—	—	—
1991–92	Moose Jaw Warriors	WHL	8	1	1	2	0	—	—	—	—	—
1992–93	Seattle Thunderbirds	WHL	46	13	13	26	27	—	—	—	—	—
1992–93	Portland Winter Hawks	WHL	27	20	17	37	16	15	8	13	21	19
1993–94	Portland Winter Hawks	WHL	70	62	90	152	80	10	8	11	19	13
1994–95	Syracuse Crunch	AHL	67	30	45	75	71	—	—	—	—	—
1995–96	Syracuse Crunch	AHL	74	40	39	79	82	16	14	8	22	16
1995–96	Vancouver Canucks	NHL	3	0	1	1	0	—	—	—	—	—
1996–97	Syracuse Crunch	AHL	41	22	30	52	28	3	2	2	4	4
1996–97	Vancouver Canucks	NHL	36	11	11	22	10	—	—	—	—	—
1997–98	Vancouver Canucks	NHL	31	2	1	3	4	—	—	—	—	—
1997–98	Syracuse Crunch	AHL	17	12	12	24	8	—	—	—	—	—
1997–98	St. John's Maple Leafs	AHL	11	7	9	16	10	2	1	1	2	2
1997–98	Toronto Maple Leafs	NHL	6	3	3	6	4	—	—	—	—	—
1998–99	St. John's Maple Leafs	AHL	70	34	48	82	40	5	2	4	6	2
1998–99	Toronto Maple Leafs	NHL	7	3	0	3	4	9	3	6	9	2
1999–2000	Manitoba Moose	IHL	63	18	33	51	45	2	0	0	0	2
2000–01	HC Davos	NLA	43	28	32	60	42	4	0	1	1	2
2001–02	HC Davos	NLA	43	20	26	46	22	16	13	8	21	2
2002–03	HC Davos	NLA	44	22	21	43	46	17	3	7	10	16
2003–04	HC Davos	NLA	11	4	1	5	2	—	—	—	—	—
2003–04	ZSC Lions	NLA	33	18	20	38	24	11	3	8	11	31
2004–05	Fort Worth Brahmas	CHL	2	0	2	2	2	—	—	—	—	—
2004–05	Chicago Wolves	AHL	62	20	37	57	18	18	3	9	12	6
2005–06	Adler Mannheim	DEL	19	4	9	13	20	—	—	—	—	—
AHL totals			342	165	220	385	257	44	22	24	46	30
NHL totals			83	19	16	35	22	9	3	6	9	2
NLA totals			174	92	100	192	136	48	19	24	43	51

== Awards and honours ==
Award	Year
WHL
West First All-Star Team	1994
Bob Clarke Trophy	1994
Brad Hornung Trophy	1994
CHL First All-Star Team	1994
NLA
Forward of the Year	2001, 2002
Most Points (59)	2001
Spengler Cup (HC Davos)	2001
Spengler Cup All-Star Team	2001, 2003
Spengler Cup MVP	2003

== Records ==
- Syracuse Crunch franchise single-season goals record - 40 in 1995–96
- Previous Syracuse Crunch single-season points record - 79 in 1995–96 (tied with Bill Bowler, 2000–01. Later surpassed by Carter Verhaeghe during the 2018–19 season).
- Previous Syracuse Crunch all-time goal scoring record - 104 (surpassed by Mark Hartigan on January 19, 2007)
