= Saskatoon Blades =

Western Hockey League team in Saskatoon, Saskatchewan

- City: Saskatoon, Saskatchewan
- League: Western Hockey League
- Conference: Eastern
- Division: East
- Founded: 1964
- Home arena: SaskTel Centre
- Colours: Royal blue, gold, white
- Owner: Mike Priestner
- General manager: Colin Priestner
- Head coach: Dan DaSilva
- Website: chl.ca/whl-blades/

Franchise history
- 1964–1966: Saskatchewan Junior Hockey League
- 1966–present: Western Hockey League

Championships
- Regular season titles: 5 (1972–73, 1982–83, 1987–88, 2010–11, 2023–24)
- Playoff championships: Division titles 2 (1991–92, 1993–94); Ed Chynoweth Cup 0

Current uniform

The Saskatoon Blades are a Canadian major junior ice hockey team based in Saskatoon, Saskatchewan. Founded in 1964, the Blades were a charter team of the then-Western Canada Junior Hockey League in 1966, and are the only club that has played every season in the league in its original location. Today, the team plays in the East Division of the Western Hockey League's Eastern Conference, and hosts games at the SaskTel Centre. Despite five regular season titles and five appearances in the championship series, the Blades have never won the Ed Chynoweth Cup as league playoff champions. The team has twice hosted the Memorial Cup tournament, in 1989 and in 2013.

== History ==
=== WHL founding member ===
The Blades were established in 1964 as members of the Saskatchewan Junior Hockey League, evolving from the Saskatoon Junior Quakers, who had played in the league since 1956. Owner Jim Piggott saw the team as a junior affiliate for his minor professional Western Hockey League Los Angeles Blades. However, Piggott became an instrumental figure in establishing a new major junior league for Western Canada that could compete against teams across Canada for the Memorial Cup. The Blades became one of seven founding members of the Canadian Major Junior Hockey League in 1966, which became the Western Canada Junior Hockey League in 1967, the Western Canada Hockey League in 1968, and, finally, the Western Hockey League in 1978, after the admission of American-based clubs. The Blades are the only team to have played every WHL season in its original location—the Regina Pats were also a founding team, but briefly left the WHL to re-join the SJHL at the end of the 1960s.

The Blades, playing out of the 1930s-era Saskatoon Arena, were a middling team in the late 1960s, failing to win a playoff series in any of their first six seasons.

=== The Jackie McLeod era ===
The Blades hired Jackie McLeod, a former National Hockey League (NHL) player from Regina who had also managed the Canadian national team from 1967 to 1969, as its coach and general manager, roles he filled for most of the 1970s. McLeod also became part owner of the franchise from 1976 to 1980 after he partnered with two others, including Nate Brodsky, to buy the team from Piggott. Under McLeod's guidance and with star players like Bernie Federko, Bob Bourne, Larry Sacharauk, Brent Ashton, Randy Ireland, and Blair Chapman, the Blades emerged as a contending team in the 1970s, missing the playoffs just once and making three finals appearances. Saskatoon finished with the league's best record in 1972–73 and made their first ever appearance in the league final, which they lost to the Medicine Hat Tigers. The Blades topped the East Division in both the 1974–75 and 1975–76 seasons and made consecutive finals appearances; they lost both in seven games to a dynastic New Westminster Bruins team that made four straight Memorial Cup finals appearances from 1975 to 1978. McLeod's last season behind the bench was 1978–79, when the Blades lost the Division final to the eventual champion and Memorial Cup-finalist Brandon Wheat Kings.

=== Under the Brodsky family ===
In 1980, the Brodsky family, which had become majority owners in 1976, took over sole ownership of the club, which they would retain until 2013. Despite the presence of new star players and future NHL figures like Lane Lambert, Brian Skrudland, Wendel Clark, Trent Yawney, Marc Habscheid, Todd McLellan, Curtis Leschyshyn, and Tim Cheveldae, the Blades continued to fall short of the elusive league championship. The team topped the league standings in both the 1982–83 and 1987–88 seasons, but failed to advance to the finals either season. The highlights of the 1980s were the opening of the new Saskatchewan Place arena in 1988, and hosting the 1989 Memorial Cup there. The Blades' first game at the new rink took place on 9 February 1988, a 4–3 victory over the Wheat Kings, a game in which the Blades trailed 3–0, in front of a sell-out crowd of 9,343. In the 1989 Memorial Cup tournament, the Blades, who lost in the third round of the WHL playoffs to the Swift Current Broncos, met the Broncos in the Final, losing in overtime by a score of 4–3.

The Blades finally returned to the championship series twice in the first half of the 1990s, both times facing the Kamloops Blazers. Coached by Lorne Molleken and led on the ice by the likes of Glen Gulutzan, Richard Matvichuk, Rhett Warrener, Wade Belak, and Norm Maracle, the Blades lost both the 1992 and 1994 finals 4 games to 3 against Blazers teams that went on to win the Memorial Cup, part of a run of three Memorial Cups in four years for Kamloops, the only team to achieve such a feat. The run to the 1994 finals would mark the last time the Blades would advance past the second round of the WHL playoffs for nearly three decades. Before 1997, the Blades had failed to qualify for the post-season only five times; between 1997 and 2008, they would miss the playoffs six times, despite boasting future NHL players including Martin Erat, Mike Green, Devin Setoguchi, Anton Khudobin, and Braden Holtby.

After moving to the professional ranks in 1995, Molleken returned to coach the Blades in 2004, a role he would keep until 2013. He added general manager duties in 2011, and stayed in that role until 2014. The Blades won another regular season title in this era, finishing with the best record of the 2010–11 season. Despite trading for star forward Brayden Schenn, the Blades lost in the second round to the eventual champions, the Kootenay Ice. Saskatoon also hosted its second Memorial Cup tournament in 2013. The Blades appeared to be peaking towards the end of the WHL regular season, winning 18 straight games between late January and early March. During that run, the Blades set a record attendance mark of 12,588 on 9 February against the Lethbridge Hurricanes, 25 years to the day since the opening of their arena. However, the team lost its first round playoff series against the Medicine Hat Tigers, and won just one game at the Memorial Cup tournament.

=== New ownership ===
After hosting the 2013 Memorial Cup, it became known that the Brodsky family was looking to sell the Blades after 37 years of ownership. In August 2013, Brodsky sold the team to Edmonton businessman Mike Priestner, who had previously attempted to purchase the Kamloops Blazers in 2007. Priestner had played as a goaltender in the league for the Kamloops Chiefs in 1974–75, while his son James tended goal for the Blazers and two other teams from 2007 to 2011. The new ownership expressed a commitment to keeping the team in Saskatoon, and Mike's son Colin Priestner moved to the city and ultimately took over as general manager.

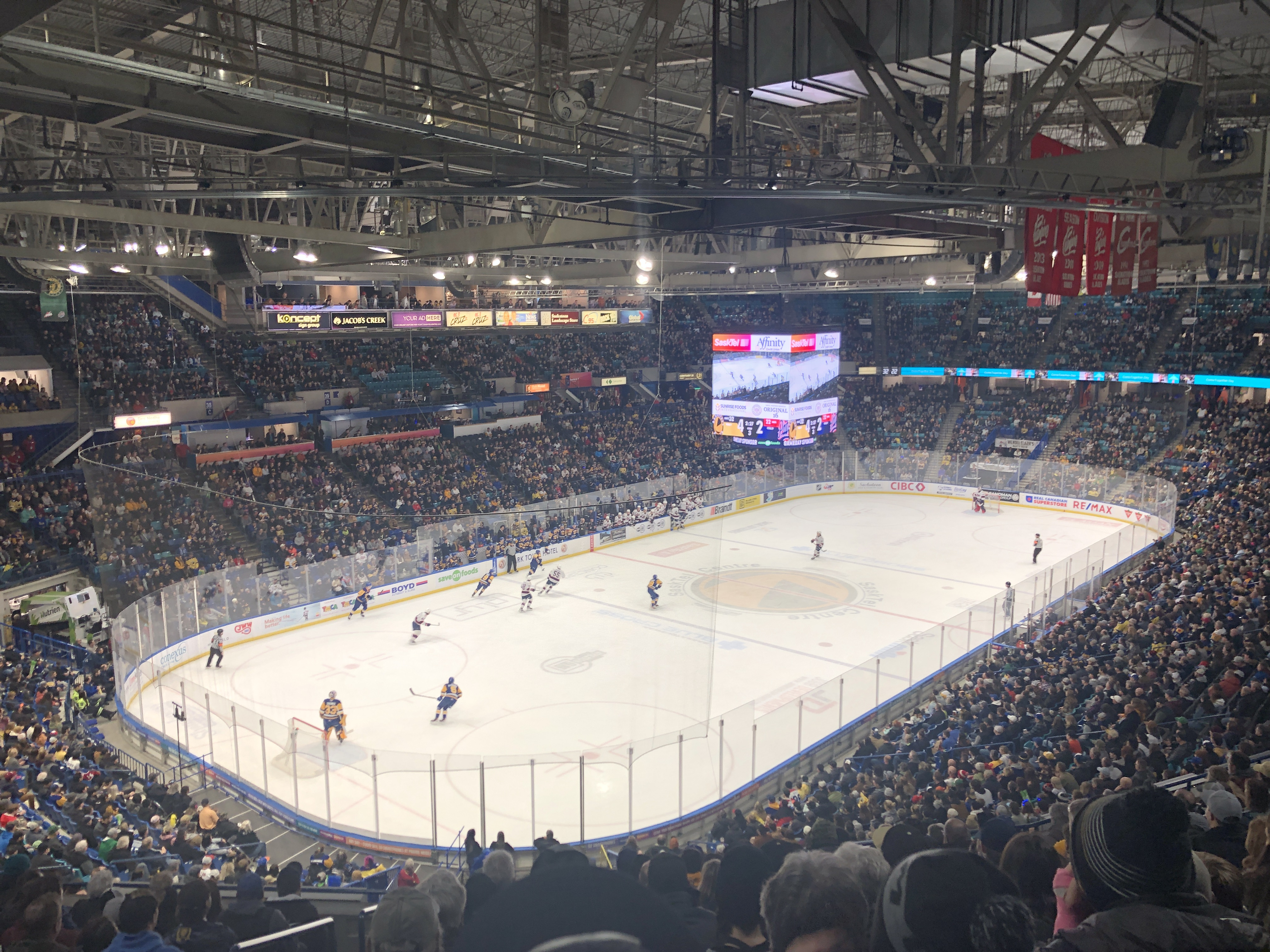
The Blades and Regina Pats facing off in the first round of the 2023 playoffs.

This marked the beginning of a challenging on-ice period for the Blades, who had sacrificed draft picks and prospects for trades in anticipation of a longer 2013 Memorial Cup season. The team missed the playoffs for five consecutive seasons from 2014 to 2018. Led by Kirby Dach, the Blades returned to the playoffs in 2019 and won their first playoff series since 2011, but the COVID-19 pandemic led to the cancellation of the 2020 playoffs and a heavily modified 2021 campaign without playoffs. The team finally found more on-ice consistency as the WHL returned to regular scheduling in the 2021–22 season. In 2022–23, the Blades posted their first 100-point season since 2011, and went on their deepest playoff run since 1994. The Blades met the Regina Pats—captained by top NHL prospect Connor Bedard—in the first round, the first playoff matchup between the teams since 2006; the Blades set new attendance records against the Pats, selling out multiple games to the capacity of 14,768 for the first time in team history. Despite losing the first two games of the series on home ice, the Blades won the series 4 games to 3, winning the decisive game 7 at home by a score of 4–1. In the second round, the Blades became just the third team in WHL history to win a series after falling behind 3 games to none, defeating the Red Deer Rebels at home in game 7 by a 5–2 score. The Blades' run came to an end in their first third-round appearance in nearly 30 years, when they were swept by the top-seeded Winnipeg Ice. The Blades followed this up in 2023–24 with their fifth Scotty Munro Trophy for best regular season record, reaching the 50-win plateau for the third time. In the playoffs, they defeated the Prince Albert Raiders in five games and swept the Rebels in the second round; they lost to the eventual-champion Moose Jaw Warriors in their second straight third round appearance in a 7-game series that featured a WHL-record six overtime games, including all four hosted in Saskatoon. The season also saw the Blades play their record 4,000th game in the WHL.

=== Memorial Cup appearances ===
The Blades have never won a WHL championship for the chance to compete for the Memorial Cup. However, Saskatoon has hosted the Memorial Cup tournament twice, in 1989 and in 2013, enabling the Blades to participate. In 1989, a year after the team began playing at Saskatchewan Place, the Blades were joined by their provincial counterpart and WHL Champion Swift Current Broncos, the OHL Champion Peterborough Petes, and the QMJHL Champion Laval Titan. The Blades finished first in the round robin with a 2–1 record, including a 5–4 victory over the Broncos, who had a 14-game undefeated streak dating back to the start of the WHL playoffs, including a third-round sweep over the Blades. Their record gave the Blades a berth in the Memorial Cup final, where they lost a re-match to the Broncos, 4–3 in overtime. It was the first Memorial Cup final contested between two teams from the WHL, let alone from Saskatchewan. The tournament set a new attendance record.

In 2013, which marked the 25-year anniversary of their home arena, the tournament included the WHL Champion Portland Winterhawks, the OHL Champion London Knights, and the QMJHL Champion Halifax Mooseheads. The Blades finished the round robin with a 1–2 record, their lone win coming over the Mooseheads, and they lost to the Knights in a tiebreaker, failing to advance to the semi-final. The Mooseheads won the Memorial Cup with a 6–4 victory over the Winterhawks. The tournament boasted the fourth-highest attendance to date in tournament history.

=== Rivalries ===
The Blades have longstanding rivalries with the Regina Pats and Prince Albert Raiders, the two teams closest to the Blades' home in Saskatoon—all three cities are connected via Highway 11. The Blades have faced the Pats in the playoffs seven times and the Raiders eight times. The only other teams they have met in the post-season eight times are the Broncos—including five meetings since the franchise returned to Swift Current from Lethbridge in 1986—and the Brandon Wheat Kings. The Blades also faced the Broncos in the 1989 Memorial Cup final.

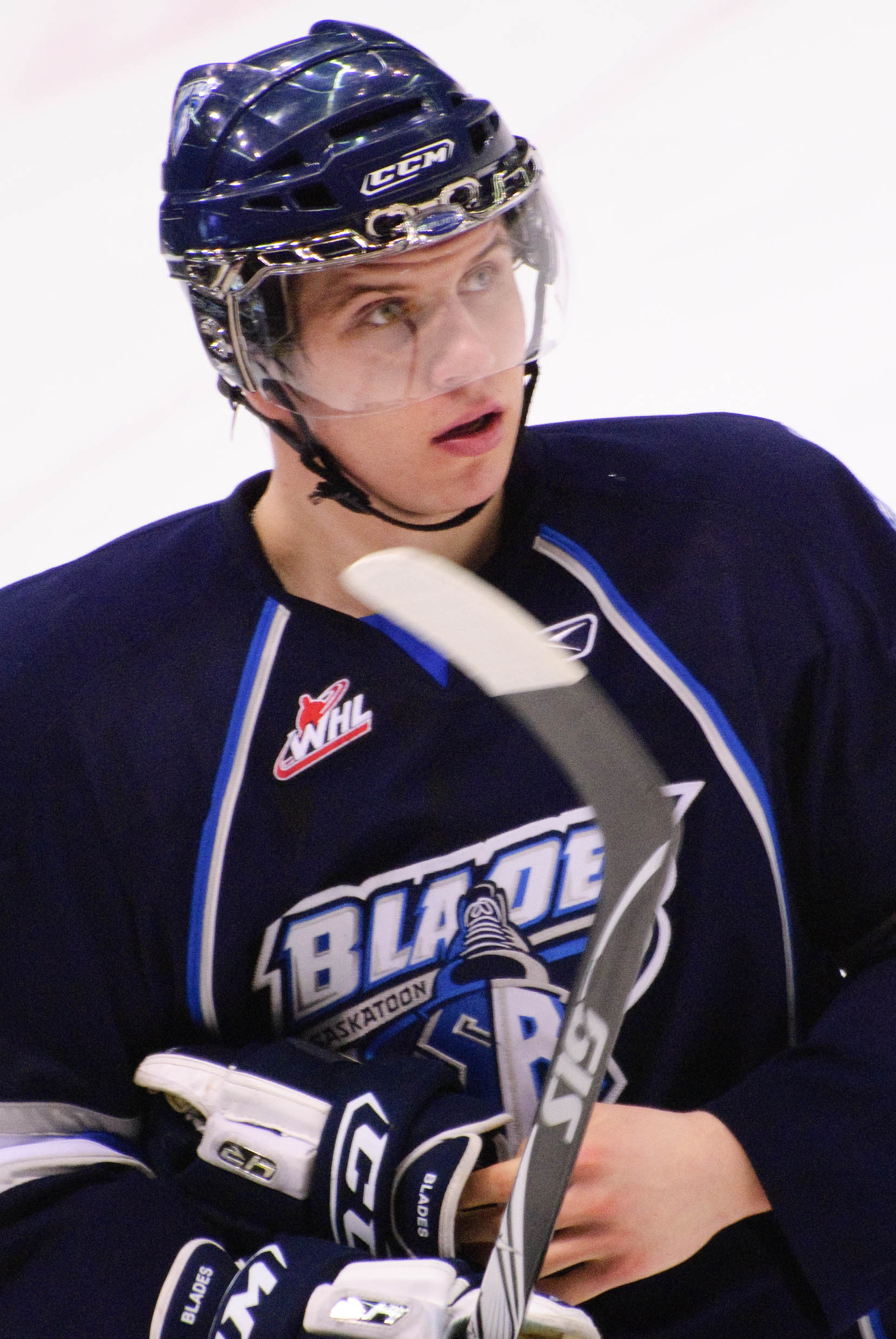
Brayden Schenn in 2011, in a non-Pac Man era jersey.

== Logo and jerseys ==
For most of the team's history, the Blades have sported royal blue, gold, and white jerseys featuring a variation of a skate blade logo that has become known as the "Pac-Man." They dropped that logo from primary status in 1993, and dropped yellow from the colour palette in 2004, opting for navy blue and white on a new skate logo, with the skate blade emerging from stylized "SB" initials. In 2017, the Blades re-adopted their classic colour scheme and logo.

Like many major junior teams, the Blades frequently don special event jerseys, such as Star Wars-themed jerseys they wore in a 2015 game. In September 2018, the Blades wore a special jersey to honour the Humboldt Broncos after the Broncos bus crash earlier that year. In 2022, the Blades unveiled their first Pride-themed jerseys, which they wore on a Pride night on 22 January. During the 2012–13 season, the Blades held a fan jersey design contest; the team wore the winning jersey, designed by Fabio Burà, during a game on 2 February 2013.

The Blades' mascot is a yeti named Poke Check.

== Season-by-season record ==
Note: GP = Games played, W = Wins, L = Losses, T = Ties, OTL = Overtime losses, Pts = Points, GF = Goals for, GA = Goals against

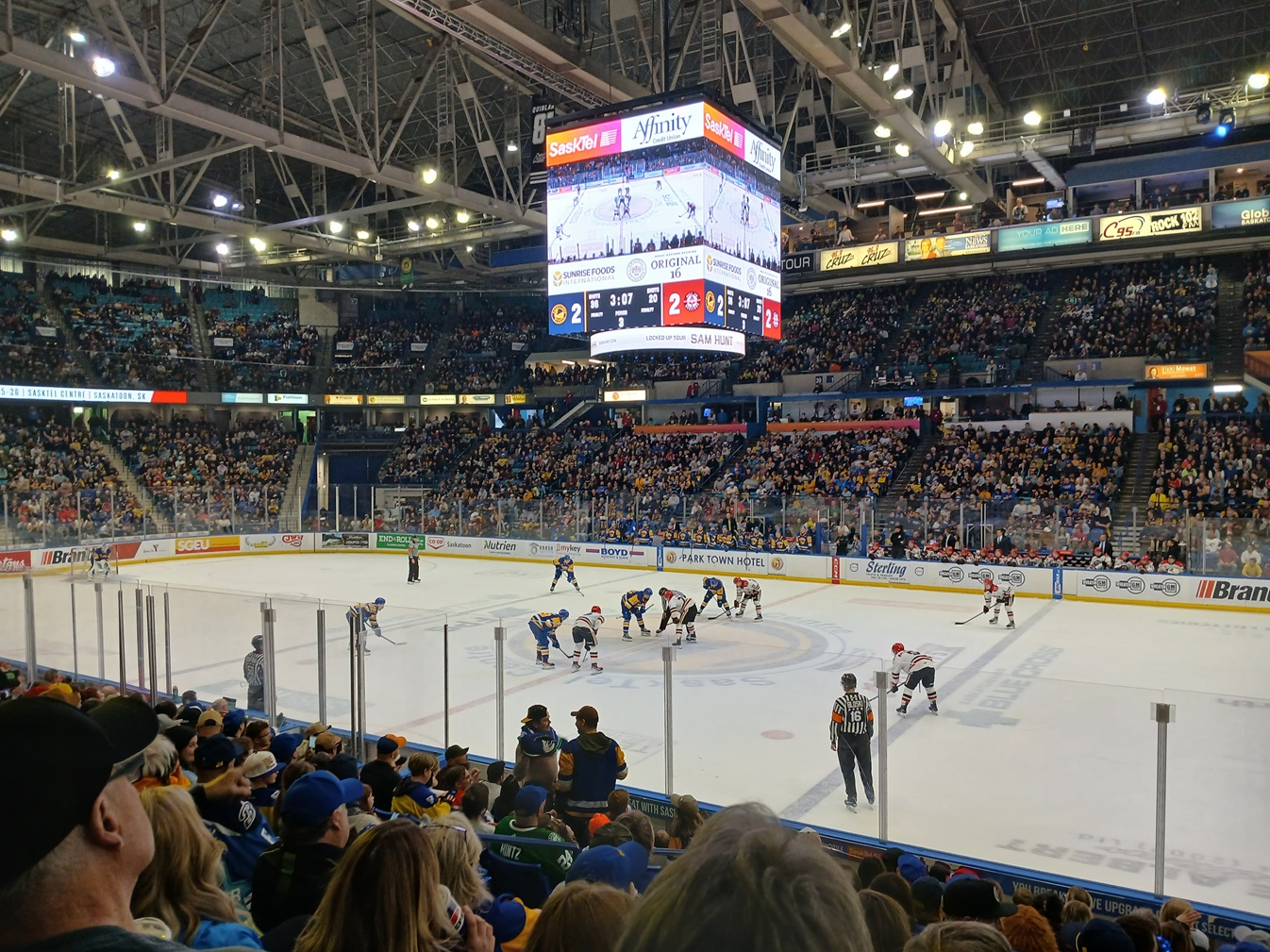
The Blades face-off against the Moose Jaw Warriors in the 2024 Eastern Conference Final.

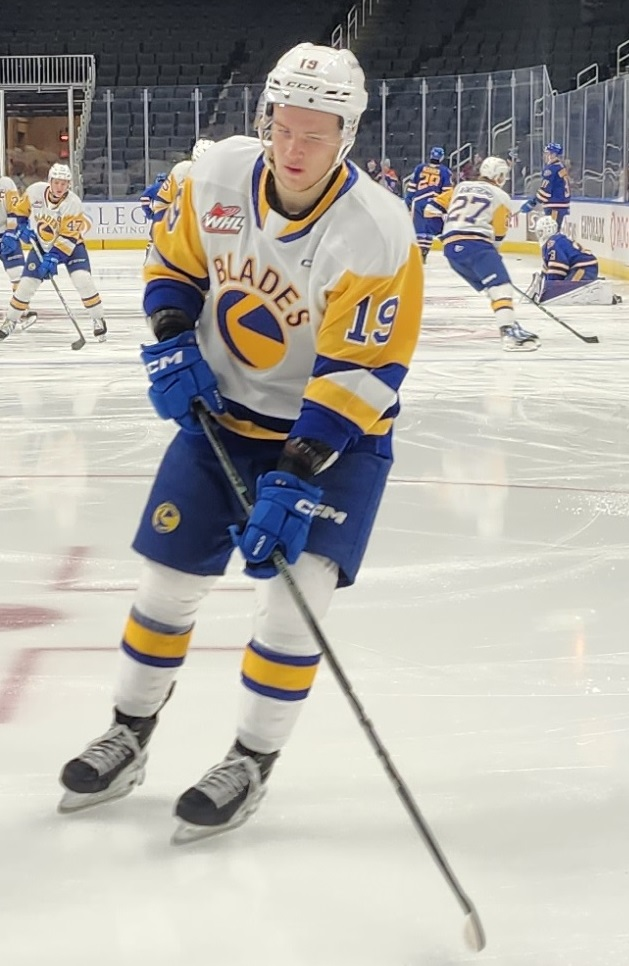
Egor Sidorov warming up before a game in Edmonton.

Season	GP	W	L	T	OTL	GF	GA	Points	Finish	Playoffs
1966–67	56	25	24	7	–	288	271	57	5th Overall	Lost quarterfinal
1967–68	60	20	31	9	–	260	362	49	7th Overall	Lost quarterfinal
1968–69	60	24	35	1	–	195	271	49	3rd West	Lost quarterfinal
1969–70	60	18	41	1	–	202	282	37	4th West	Lost quarterfinal
1970–71	66	29	36	1	–	295	299	59	3rd West	Lost quarterfinal
1971–72	68	37	28	3	–	312	258	77	2nd East	Lost quarterfinal
1972–73	68	46	11	11	–	323	184	103	1st East	Lost final
1973–74	68	30	29	9	–	283	272	69	4th East	Lost quarterfinal
1974–75	70	38	22	10	–	344	244	86	1st East	Lost final
1975–76	72	43	19	10	–	390	269	96	1st East	Lost final
1976–77	72	30	30	12	–	317	290	72	2nd East	Lost preliminary round
1977–78	72	20	50	2	–	340	460	42	4th East	Did not qualify
1978–79	72	26	32	14	–	385	398	66	2nd East	Lost East Division final
1979–80	72	27	40	5	–	331	382	59	7th East	Did not qualify
1980–81	72	22	47	3	–	297	427	47	8th East	Did not qualify
1981–82	72	44	26	2	–	450	343	90	3rd East	Lost East Division quarterfinal
1982–83	72	52	19	1	–	467	303	105	1st East	Lost East Division semifinal
1983–84	72	36	36	0	–	347	350	72	7th East	Did not qualify
1984–85	72	29	41	2	–	309	378	60	6th East	Lost East Division quarterfinal
1985–86	72	38	28	6	–	381	360	82	4th East	Lost East Division semifinal
1986–87	72	44	26	2	–	369	282	90	2nd East	Lost East Division final
1987–88	72	47	22	3	–	381	294	97	1st East	Lost East Division final
1988–89	72	42	28	2	–	366	335	86	2nd East	Lost East Division final; Lost Memorial Cup final
1989–90	72	33	34	5	–	325	354	71	4th East	Lost East Division semifinal
1990–91	72	29	41	2	–	309	363	60	7th East	Did not qualify
1991–92	72	38	29	5	–	315	260	81	3rd East	Lost final
1992–93	72	42	27	3	–	311	236	87	3rd East	Lost East Division semifinal
1993–94	72	49	22	1	–	326	229	99	1st East	Lost final
1994–95	72	41	23	8	–	324	254	90	3rd East	Lost East Division semifinal
1995–96	72	29	42	1	–	314	351	59	4th East	Lost Eastern Conference quarterfinal
1996–97	72	18	48	6	–	227	344	42	6th East	Did not qualify
1997–98	72	25	39	8	–	263	327	58	4th East	Lost Eastern Conference quarterfinal
1998–99	72	16	49	7	–	184	291	39	6th East	Did not qualify
1999–00	72	34	27	8	3	216	223	79	2nd East	Lost Eastern Conference semifinal
2000–01	72	19	43	5	5	193	265	48	5th East	Did not qualify
2001–02	72	27	37	5	3	216	257	62	4th East	Lost Eastern Conference quarterfinal
2002–03	72	40	27	5	0	234	205	85	3rd East	Lost Eastern Conference quarterfinal
2003–04	72	7	52	11	2	140	279	27	5th East	Did not qualify
2004–05	72	37	23	6	6	234	215	86	2nd East	Lost Eastern Conference quarterfinal
Season	GP	W	L	OTL	SOL	GF	GA	Points	Finish	Playoffs
2005–06	72	41	25	2	4	232	217	88	2nd East	Lost Eastern Conference semifinal
2006–07	72	27	41	2	2	174	231	58	6th East	Did not qualify
2007–08	72	29	34	3	6	182	229	67	5th East	Did not qualify
2008–09	72	49	18	3	2	283	195	103	1st East	Lost Eastern Conference quarterfinal
2009–10	72	46	19	3	4	258	227	99	2nd East	Lost Eastern Conference semifinal
2010–11	72	56	13	1	2	310	213	115	1st East	Lost Eastern Conference semifinal
2011–12	72	40	29	1	2	268	250	83	2nd East	Lost Eastern Conference quarterfinal
2012–13	72	44	22	2	4	280	221	94	1st East	Lost Eastern Conference quarterfinal
2013–14	72	16	51	2	3	207	317	37	6th East	Did not qualify
2014–15	72	19	49	2	2	195	308	42	6th East	Did not qualify
2015–16	72	26	42	4	0	219	318	56	6th East	Did not qualify
2016–17	72	28	35	7	2	190	248	65	5th East	Did not qualify
2017–18	72	35	33	3	1	237	276	74	6th East	Did not qualify
2018–19	68	45	15	8	0	259	190	98	2nd East	Lost Eastern Conference semifinal
2019–20	63	34	24	2	3	211	197	73	4th East	Cancelled due to COVID-19 pandemic
2020–21	24	16	5	2	1	80	62	35	3rd East	No playoffs held due to COVID-19 pandemic
2021–22	68	38	26	3	1	219	217	80	3rd East	Lost Eastern Conference quarterfinal
2022–23	68	48	15	4	1	257	171	101	2nd East	Lost Eastern Conference final
2023–24	68	50	13	2	3	255	163	105	1st East	Lost Eastern Conference final
2024–25	68	37	23	4	4	235	218	82	3rd East	Lost Eastern Conference quarterfinal
2025–26	68	34	27	5	2	220	224	75	3rd East	Lost Eastern Conference semifinal

== Championship history ==
- Scotty Munro Memorial Trophy (5): 1972–73, 1982–83, 1987–88, 2010–11, 2023–24
- Division Playoff Champions (2): 1991–92, 1993–94
- Regular Season Division Champions (10): 1972–73, 1974–75, 1975–76, 1982–83, 1987–88, 1993–94, 2008–09, 2010–11, 2012–13, 2023–24

=== WHL Championship ===
- 1972–73: Loss, 2–0–3 vs Medicine Hat Tigers
- 1974–75: Loss, 3–4 vs New Westminster Bruins
- 1975–76: Loss, 1–2–4 vs New Westminster Bruins
- 1991–92: Loss, 3–4 vs Kamloops Blazers
- 1993–94: Loss, 3–4 vs Kamloops Blazers

=== Memorial Cup Championship ===
- 1989: Loss, 3–4 (OT) vs Swift Current Broncos

== Coaches ==
=== Hockey staff ===
General Manager: Colin Priestner

Head Coach: Dan DaSilva Associate Coach: TBA Assistant Coach: Wacey Rabbit Assistant Coach: Jerome Engele

=== Past coaches ===
#	Coach	Years
1	Burns McDonald	1964–65
2	George Agar	1964–69
†	George Senick	1969–70
3	Jackie McLeod	1970–79
4	Jerry Engele	1979–80
5	Lorne Frey	1980–81
6	Daryl Lubiniecki	1981–84
7	Marcel Comeau	1984–89
8	Terry Ruskowski	1989–91
†	Bob Hoffmeyer	1991
9	Lorne Molleken	1991–95
10	Donn Clark	1995–98
†	Willie Desjardins	1998
11	Brad McCrimmon	1998–2000
12	Kevin Dickie	2000–03
†	Jamie Reeve	2003–04
13	Lorne Molleken	2004–13
14	Dave Struch	2013–14
15	Bob Woods	2014–16
16	Dean Brockman	2016–18
17	Mitch Love	2018–2021
18	Brennan Sonne	2021–2024
19	Dan DaSilva	2024–Present
† Interim coach

== Players ==
=== NHL alumni ===
Bernie Federko is the only former Blades' player inducted into the Hockey Hall of Fame.

List of Blades' players who also played in the National Hockey League (NHL):

- Dennis Abgrall
- Brent Ashton
- Blair Atcheynum
- Frank Banham
- Wade Belak
- Ryan Bonni
- Bob Bourne
- Dave Brown
- Murray Brumwell
- Jeff Buchanan
- Lindsay Carson
- Blair Chapman
- Kelly Chase
- Rich Chernomaz
- Tim Cheveldae
- Wendel Clark
- Pat Conacher
- Barry Cummins
- Kirby Dach
- Larry DePalma
- Bruce Eakin
- Stefan Elliott
- Jerry Engele
- Martin Erat
- Garnet Exelby
- Bernie Federko
- Micheal Ferland
- Perry Ganchar
- Michael Garnett
- Randy Gilhen
- Colton Gillies
- Brian Glynn
- Lee Goren
- Mike Green
- Mike Greenlay
- Marc Habscheid
- Libor Hajek
- Bill Hajt
- Curtis Hamilton
- Neil Hawryliw
- Dale Henry
- Bob Hoffmeyer
- Bill Hogaboam
- Braden Holtby
- Doug Horbul
- Darcy Hordichuk
- Randy Ireland
- Grant Jennings
- Terry Johnson
- Kevin Kaminski
- Ryan Keller
- Dean Kennedy
- Anton Khudobin
- Orest Kindrachuk
- Ralph Klassen
- Joey Kocur
- Roger Kortko
- Don Kozak
- Dave Kryskow
- Milan Kytnar
- Lane Lambert
- James Latos
- Kirby Law
- Grant Ledyard
- Curtis Leschyshyn
- Dave Lewis
- Ron Loustel
- Steve MacIntyre
- Keith Magnuson
- Norm Maracle
- Richard Matvichuk
- Chris McAllister
- Brad McCrimmon
- Todd McLellan
- Jim McTaggart
- Fraser Minten
- Bill Oleschuk
- Dave Parro
- George Pesut
- Warren Peters
- Gerry Pinder
- Pat Price
- Aaron Rome
- Terry Ruskowski
- Larry Sacharuk
- Don Saleski
- Terran Sandwith
- Cory Sarich
- Brayden Schenn
- Nikita Scherbak
- Bobby Schmautz
- Scott Scissons
- Devin Setoguchi
- Brent Severyn
- Duncan Siemens
- Todd Simpson
- Brian Skrudland
- Randy Smith
- Martin Sonnenberg
- Brent Sopel
- Lee Sorochan
- Daryl Stanley
- David Struch
- Todd Strueby
- Ken Sutton
- Ryan Tobler
- Rocky Trottier
- Tony Twist
- Shaun Van Allen
- Russ Walker
- Rhett Warrener
- Fred Williams
- Clarke Wilm
- Mark Wotton
- Trent Yawney

=== Retired numbers ===
Saskatoon Blades logo 1983/84–1992/93.

#	Player
7	Gerry Pinder / Brent Ashton
10	Brian Skrudland
12	Bob Bourne
15	Bernie Federko
22	Wendel Clark
39	Frank Banham
44	Chase Wouters

In addition to the seven retired numbers, the Blades unveiled a banner honouring former captain Bruce Gordon in 2017. Gordon went on to a long career in policing and later attended law school, before he was diagnosed with cancer and died in 2017.

== Team records ==
Team records for a single season
Statistic	Total	Season
Most points	115	2010–11
Most wins	56	2010–11
Most road wins	28	2008–09
Most home wins	32	2010–11
Most goals for	461	1982–83
Fewest goals for	140	2003–04
Fewest goals against	163	2023–24
Most goals against	460	1977–78

Individual player records for a single season
Statistic	Player	Total	Season
Most goals	Frank Banham	83	1995–96
Most assists	Bruce Eakin	125	1981–82
Most points	Bernie Federko	187	1975–76
Most points, rookie	Lane Lambert	114	1981–82
Most points, defenceman	Pat Price	95	1973–74
Best GAA (goalie)	Ed Humphreys	2.57	1972–73
Goalies = minimum 1500 minutes played

Career records
Statistic	Player	Total	Career
Most goals	Frank Banham	190	1992–1996
Most assists	Paul Buczkowski	224	1990–1996
Most points	Frank Banham	370	1992–1996
Most points, defenceman	Stefan Elliott	241	2007–2011
Most games played	Paul Buczkowski	337	1990–1996
Most wins (goalie)	Nolan Maier	122	2017–2022
Most shutouts (goalie)	Nolan Maier	12	2017–2022

== Awards ==
Bob Clarke Trophy (WHL top scorer)

- Gerry Pinder: 1966–67
- Bernie Federko: 1975–76
- Mark Deyell: 1995–96

Four Broncos Memorial Trophy (WHL player of the year)

- Gerry Pinder: 1966–67
- Bernie Federko: 1975–76

Jim Piggott Memorial Trophy (WHL rookie of the year)

- Ron Fairbrother: 1967–68

Bill Hunter Memorial Trophy (WHL top defenceman)

- George Pesut: 1972–73
- Pat Price: 1973–74
- Wendel Clark: 1984–85
- Richard Matvichuk: 1991–92
- Stefan Elliott: 2010–11

Del Wilson Trophy (WHL top goaltender)

- Ed Humphreys: 1972–73
- Bill Oleschuk: 1974–75
- Norm Maracle: 1993–94

Dunc McCallum Memorial Trophy (WHL coach of the year)

- Daryl Lubiniecki: 1982–83
- Marcel Comeau: 1987–88
- Lorne Molleken: 1993–94
- Brennan Sonne: 2022–23

Doc Seaman Trophy (WHL scholastic player of the year)

- Stefan Elliott: 2008–09
- Nelson Nogier: 2013–14

Hap Emms Memorial Trophy (Memorial Cup top goaltender)

- Mike Greenlay: 1989 Memorial Cup
- Andrey Makarov: 2013 Memorial Cup

== See also ==
- Ice hockey in Saskatchewan
- List of ice hockey teams in Saskatchewan
