= Randy Ireland =

Canadian ice hockey player

- Born: April 5, 1957 (age 67); Rosetown, Saskatchewan, Canada
- Height: 6 ft 0 in (183 cm)
- Weight: 165 lb (75 kg; 11 st 11 lb)
- Position: Goaltender
- Caught: Left
- Played for: Buffalo Sabres
- NHL draft: 60th overall, 1977; Chicago Black Hawks; 82nd overall, 1978; Buffalo Sabres
- Playing career: 1977–1983

Randy Ireland (born April 5, 1957) is a Canadian former professional ice hockey goaltender. He played two games in the National Hockey League with the Buffalo Sabres during the 1978–79 season. The rest of his career, which lasted from 1977 to 1983, was spent in various minor leagues.

== Playing career ==
Born in Rosetown, Saskatchewan and raised in Biggar, Saskatchewan, Ireland played junior with the Saskatoon Blades of the Western Canada Hockey League from 1973 to 1976, then one final season with the Portland Winterhawks. He was selected in the fourth round, 60th overall by the Chicago Black Hawks in the 1977 NHL Amateur Draft. However he re-entered the draft in 1978 and was selected by the Buffalo Sabres in the fifth round, 82nd overall. He turned professional in 1977, and played in different minor leagues until 1983. His lone National Hockey League experience coming in two games with the Sabres during the 1978–79 season; he played a total of 30 minutes between the two games.

== Career statistics ==
=== Regular season and playoffs ===
			Regular season									Playoffs
Season	Team	League	GP	W	L	T	MIN	GA	SO	GAA	SV%	GP	W	L	MIN	GA	SO	GAA	SV%
1972–73	Estevan Bruins	SJHL	—	—	—	—	—	—	—	—	—	—	—	—	—	—	—	—	—
1973–74	Saskatoon Blades	WCHL	35	16	14	2	1883	124	0	3.95	.873	1	0	1	20	3	0	9.00	—
1974–75	Saskatoon Blades	WCHL	28	12	10	5	1654	114	1	4.14	.876	7	4	1	420	16	1	2.78	—
1975–76	Saskatoon Blades	WCHL	40	15	13	8	2218	148	0	4.00	.883	15	—	—	785	50	0	3.82	—
1976–77	Saskatoon Blades	WCHL	1	0	1	0	60	7	0	7.00	.841	—	—	—	—	—	—	—	—
1976–77	Portland Winterhawks	WCHL	46	22	16	6	2589	162	3	3.76	.887	10	—	—	611	27	1	2.65	.920
1977–78	Flint Generals	IHL	45	—	—	—	2617	205	0	4.70	—	3	—	—	119	8	0	4.03	—
1978–79	Buffalo Sabres	NHL	2	0	0	0	30	3	0	6.02	.857	—	—	—	—	—	—	—	—
1978–79	Hershey Bears	AHL	29	9	16	1	1477	113	0	4.59	.862	—	—	—	—	—	—	—	—
1979–80	Rochester Americans	AHL	29	9	10	5	1559	94	0	3.62	.889	1	0	1	60	6	0	6.00	—
1980–81	Oklahoma City Stars	CHL	2	2	0	0	120	8	0	4.00	.822	—	—	—	—	—	—	—	—
1980–81	Baltimore Clippers	EHL	33	—	—	—	1776	105	2	3.55	—	—	—	—	—	—	—	—	—
1980–81	Richmond Rifles	EHL	13	—	—	—	770	48	0	3.74	—	4	—	—	240	23	0	5.75	—
1981–82	Mohawk Valley Stars	ACHL	25	—	—	—	1234	89	0	4.33	—	8	—	—	467	29	0	3.73	—
1982–83	Mohawk Valley Stars	ACHL	38	15	21	0	2044	148	1	4.39	.862	9	—	—	544	33	0	3.63	—
NHL totals			2	0	0	0	30	3	0	6.02	.857	—	—	—	—	—	—	—	—
