= Brandon Smith (ice hockey) =

Canadian ice hockey player

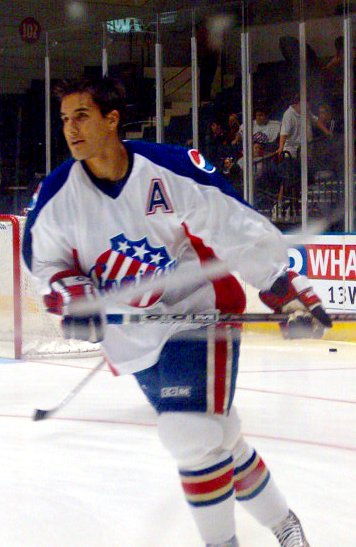
- Smith with the Rochester Americans in 2005
- Born: February 25, 1973 (age 52); Hazelton, British Columbia, Canada
- Height: 6 ft 0 in (183 cm)
- Weight: 190 lb (86 kg; 13 st 8 lb)
- Position: Defence
- Shot: Left
- Played for: Boston Bruins; New York Islanders; Eisbären Berlin; Straubing Tigers
- NHL draft: Undrafted
- Playing career: 1994–2010

Brandon Smith (born February 25, 1973) is a Canadian former professional ice hockey defenceman who played parts of four seasons in the National Hockey League (NHL) for the Boston Bruins and New York Islanders between 1999 and 2003. He played in a total of 33 NHL games and registered 3 goals and 4 assists. The rest of his career, which lasted from 1994 to 2010, was mainly spent in the minor American Hockey League, where he spent 13 seasons before playing 3 final seasons in the German Deutsche Eishockey Liga.

== Career statistics ==
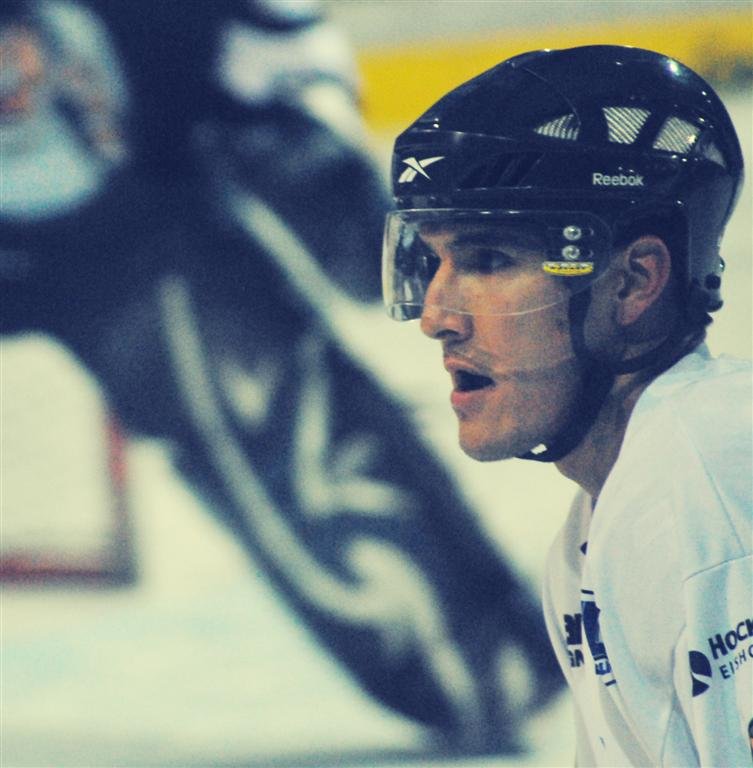
Smith in 2009

=== Regular season and playoffs ===
			Regular season					Playoffs
Season	Team	League	GP	G	A	Pts	PIM	GP	G	A	Pts	PIM
1989–90	Portland Winter Hawks	WHL	59	2	17	19	16	—	—	—	—	—
1990–91	Portland Winter Hawks	WHL	17	8	5	13	8	—	—	—	—	—
1991–92	Portland Winter Hawks	WHL	70	12	32	44	63	6	3	5	8	4
1992–93	Portland Winter Hawks	WHL	72	20	54	74	38	16	4	9	13	6
1993–94	Portland Winter Hawks	WHL	72	19	63	82	47	10	2	10	12	8
1994–95	Dayton Bombers	ECHL	60	16	49	65	57	4	2	3	5	0
1994–95	Minnesota Moose	IHL	1	0	0	0	0	—	—	—	—	—
1994–95	Adirondack Red Wings	AHL	14	1	2	3	7	3	0	0	0	2
1995–96	Adirondack Red Wings	AHL	48	4	13	17	22	3	0	1	1	2
1996–97	Adirondack Red Wings	AHL	80	8	26	34	30	4	0	0	0	0
1997–98	Adirondack Red Wings	AHL	64	9	27	36	26	1	0	1	1	0
1998–99	Boston Bruins	NHL	5	0	0	0	0	—	—	—	—	—
1998–99	Providence Bruins	AHL	72	16	46	62	32	19	1	9	10	12
1999–00	Boston Bruins	NHL	22	2	4	6	10	—	—	—	—	—
1999–00	Providence Bruins	AHL	55	8	30	38	20	14	1	11	12	2
2000–01	Boston Bruins	NHL	3	1	0	1	0	—	—	—	—	—
2000–01	Providence Bruins	AHL	63	11	28	39	30	17	0	5	5	6
2001–02	Cleveland Barons	AHL	59	6	29	35	26	—	—	—	—	—
2002–03	New York Islanders	NHL	3	0	0	0	0	—	—	—	—	—
2002–03	Bridgeport Sound Tigers	AHL	63	9	32	41	37	9	1	3	4	5
2003–04	Bridgeport Sound Tigers	AHL	74	5	23	28	39	7	1	3	4	9
2004–05	Rochester Americans	AHL	67	4	14	18	32	8	1	1	2	4
2005–06	Rochester Americans	AHL	39	4	10	14	39	—	—	—	—	—
2006–07	Rochester Americans	AHL	71	9	36	45	54	5	0	2	2	2
2007–08	Eisbären Berlin	DEL	56	7	16	23	34	11	2	8	10	2
2008–09	Eisbären Berlin	DEL	17	1	5	6	8	12	2	3	5	10
2009–10	Straubing Tigers	DEL	35	3	5	8	12	—	—	—	—	—
2010–11	Bentley Generals	ChHL	4	0	1	1	2	—	—	—	—	—
AHL totals			769	94	316	410	394	90	5	36	41	44
NHL totals			33	3	4	7	10	—	—	—	—	—

== Award and honours ==
- WHL West Second All-Star Team (1993, 1994)
- ECHL First All-Star Team (1995)
- ECHL Defenceman of the Year (1995)
- AHL First All-Star Team (1999)
