= Mark Wotton =

Canadian former ice hockey defenceman (born 1973)

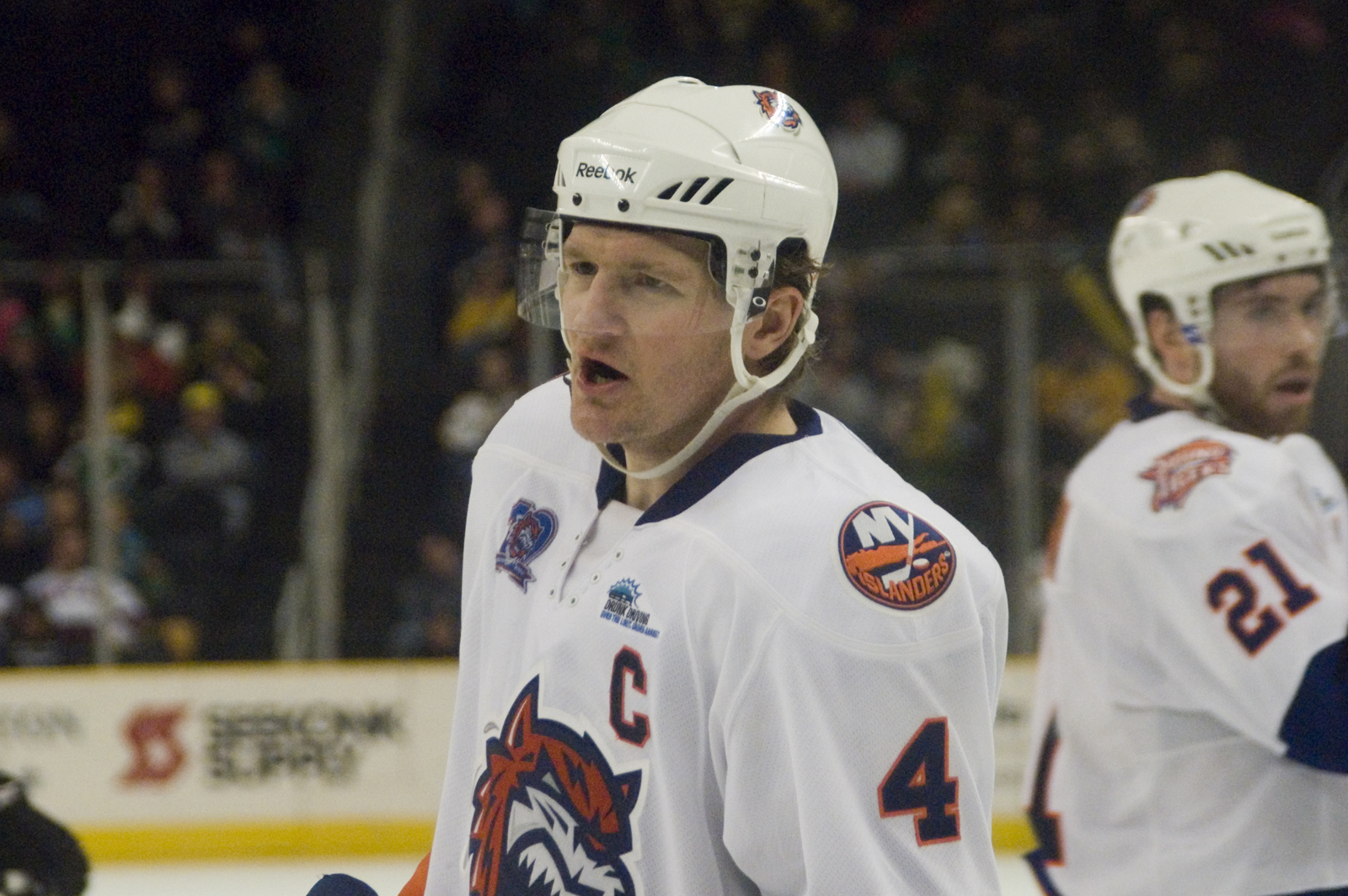
- Wotton with the Bridgeport Sound Tigers in 2011
- Born: November 16, 1973 (age 52) Foxwarren, Manitoba, Canada
- Height: 6 ft 0 in (183 cm)
- Weight: 196 lb (89 kg; 14 st 0 lb)
- Position: Defence
- Shot: Left
- Played for: Vancouver Canucks; Dallas Stars; SKA Saint Petersburg
- NHL draft: 237th overall, 1992; Vancouver Canucks
- Playing career: 1994–2011

Mark A. Wotton (born November 16, 1973) is a Canadian former ice hockey defenceman who played in the National Hockey League (NHL) for the Vancouver Canucks and Dallas Stars.

== Playing career ==
Considered small for an NHL defender, Wotton was selected 237th overall in the 1992 NHL entry draft by the Vancouver Canucks. Despite his low draft position, Wotton improved his stock considerably over the next few seasons with his intelligent positional play, leadership, and excellent work ethic. Turning pro in the 1994–95, he would score 41 points for the Syracuse Crunch of the American Hockey League and earn a one-game late-season callup to the Canucks. He would also feature in 5 playoff games for the team, before his season was ended on a vicious high-stick from St. Louis Blues winger Glenn Anderson which detached his retina.

Wotton would earn an extended audition with the Canucks in 1996–97, playing largely as a regular in the second half of the season, and finishing with 3 goals and 9 points in 36 games. He would crack the Canucks' roster out of training camp in 1997–98, but a coaching change would alter his fortunes as new Canuck coach Mike Keenan decided to go in a different direction with larger, tougher players like Jamie Huscroft and Enrico Ciccone. Wotton was sent back to the AHL where he spent the next two seasons.

Wotton left the Canucks organization in 1999 to sign with the Dallas Stars. He would spend 5 seasons in the Stars organization, but played only a single NHL game for them in the 2000–01 season. He was, however, valued for his experience on the farm and his work with younger defenders.

In 2004, Wotton signed in Russia with SKA Saint Petersburg. He would spend a year there before returning to North America, signing with the Washington Capitals. After spending the 2005–06 season with the Hershey Bears, the Capitals' AHL farm club, he signed with the New York Islanders organization for 2006–07. He was then assigned and named captain to the Islanders' AHL affiliate, the Bridgeport Sound Tigers.

Wotton has appeared 43 career NHL games, scoring 3 goals and 6 assists for 9 points. He has also made more than 800 appearances in the American Hockey League in his 16-year professional career. He retired in 2012.

== Career statistics ==
=== Regular season and playoffs ===
| | | | Regular season | | | | | Playoffs |
| Season | Team | League | GP | G | A | Pts | PIM | GP | G | A | Pts | PIM |
|---|---|---|---|---|---|---|---|---|---|---|---|---|
| 1989–90 | Saskatoon Blades | WHL | 51 | 2 | 3 | 5 | 31 | 7 | 1 | 1 | 2 | 15 |
| 1990–91 | Saskatoon Blades | WHL | 45 | 4 | 11 | 15 | 37 | — | — | — | — | — |
| 1991–92 | Saskatoon Blades | WHL | 64 | 11 | 25 | 36 | 92 | 21 | 2 | 6 | 8 | 22 |
| 1992–93 | Saskatoon Blades | WHL | 71 | 15 | 51 | 66 | 90 | 9 | 6 | 5 | 11 | 18 |
| 1993–94 | Saskatoon Blades | WHL | 65 | 12 | 34 | 46 | 108 | 16 | 3 | 12 | 15 | 32 |
| 1994–95 | Syracuse Crunch | AHL | 75 | 12 | 29 | 41 | 50 | — | — | — | — | — |
| 1994–95 | Vancouver Canucks | NHL | 1 | 0 | 0 | 0 | 0 | 5 | 0 | 0 | 0 | 4 |
| 1995–96 | Syracuse Crunch | AHL | 80 | 10 | 35 | 45 | 96 | 15 | 1 | 12 | 13 | 20 |
| 1996–97 | Syracuse Crunch | AHL | 27 | 2 | 8 | 10 | 25 | 2 | 0 | 0 | 0 | 4 |
| 1996–97 | Vancouver Canucks | NHL | 36 | 3 | 6 | 9 | 19 | — | — | — | — | — |
| 1997–98 | Syracuse Crunch | AHL | 56 | 12 | 21 | 33 | 80 | 5 | 0 | 0 | 0 | 12 |
| 1997–98 | Vancouver Canucks | NHL | 5 | 0 | 0 | 0 | 6 | — | — | — | — | — |
| 1998–99 | Syracuse Crunch | AHL | 72 | 4 | 31 | 35 | 74 | — | — | — | — | — |
| 1999–00 | Michigan K-Wings | IHL | 70 | 3 | 7 | 10 | 72 | — | — | — | — | — |
| 2000–01 | Utah Grizzlies | IHL | 63 | 2 | 2 | 4 | 64 | — | — | — | — | — |
| 2000–01 | Dallas Stars | NHL | 1 | 0 | 0 | 0 | 0 | — | — | — | — | — |
| 2001–02 | Utah Grizzlies | AHL | 57 | 9 | 18 | 27 | 68 | 4 | 0 | 1 | 1 | 6 |
| 2002–03 | Utah Grizzlies | AHL | 69 | 8 | 26 | 34 | 68 | 2 | 0 | 0 | 0 | 2 |
| 2003–04 | Utah Grizzlies | AHL | 23 | 1 | 3 | 4 | 25 | — | — | — | — | — |
| 2004–05 | SKA St. Petersburg | RSL | 50 | 3 | 3 | 6 | 32 | — | — | — | — | — |
| 2005–06 | Hershey Bears | AHL | 69 | 7 | 19 | 26 | 58 | 14 | 0 | 4 | 4 | 6 |
| 2006–07 | Bridgeport Sound Tigers | AHL | 78 | 9 | 24 | 33 | 56 | — | — | — | — | — |
| 2007–08 | Bridgeport Sound Tigers | AHL | 69 | 2 | 18 | 20 | 54 | — | — | — | — | — |
| 2008–09 | Bridgeport Sound Tigers | AHL | 73 | 5 | 16 | 21 | 40 | 5 | 0 | 0 | 0 | 0 |
| 2009–10 | Bridgeport Sound Tigers | AHL | 77 | 3 | 23 | 26 | 42 | 5 | 0 | 0 | 0 | 2 |
| 2010–11 | Bridgeport Sound Tigers | AHL | 71 | 3 | 7 | 10 | 84 | — | — | — | — | — |
| AHL totals | | | 896 | 87 | 278 | 365 | 820 | 52 | 1 | 17 | 18 | 52 |
| NHL totals | | | 43 | 3 | 6 | 9 | 25 | 5 | 0 | 0 | 0 | 4 |

== Awards and honours ==
| Award | Year |
|---|---|
WHL
| East Second All-Star Team | 1994 |
| CHL Plus/Minus Award | 1994 |
