= Ryan Duthie =

Canadian ice hockey player

- Born: September 2, 1974 (age 51) Red Deer, Alberta, Canada
- Height: 5 ft 10 in (178 cm)
- Weight: 181 lb (82 kg; 12 st 13 lb)
- Position: Centre
- Shot: Right
- Played for: AHL; Saint John Flames; Adirondack Red Wings; IHL; Manitoba Moose; SM-liiga; Tappara; Lukko; Italy; HC Merano; HC Milano; HC Pustertal; BISL; London Knights; Manchester Storm; WCHL; Fresno Falcons; Germany; EC Bad Nauheim
- National team: Canada
- NHL draft: 105th overall, 1992; New York Islanders; 91st overall, 1994; Calgary Flames
- Playing career: 1994–2006

Ryan Duthie (born September 2, 1974) is a Canadian retired professional ice hockey centre who played in North American minor leagues and in Europe.

== Career ==
Junior Hockey

Duthie played Junior hockey for the Spokane Chiefs of the WHL. For a period of 3 seasons, he amassed 270 points in 198 games. During his final season with the Chiefs, he was named to the Western Conference All-Star team.

Professional Career

During his time with the Chiefs, Duthie was selected twice in the NHL entry draft; first in 1992 by the New York Islanders 105th overall, and again in 1994 by the Calgary Flames, 91st overall.

Upon being drafted by the Flames, he turned professional, reporting to the clubs affiliate team, the Saint John Flames of the AHL. The following season, he played for the Adirondack Red Wings in the AHL. During the 1996=97 season, Duthie played 4 games with the Minnesota Moose of the IHL, and focused on playing with the Canadian National Team under coach Andy Murray.

In the 1997-98 season, Duthie moved to Finland, initially playing for Tappara, before transferring to Lukko, in the SM-Liiga. Following his stint in Finland, Duthie moved to Italy for the 1998-99 season playing for HC Merano in both Serie A and the Alpenliga.

Following a recommendation from Los Angeles Kings head coach Andy Murray, Duthie moved to Great Britain to play for the London Knights, both owned by Anschutz Entertainment Group. After playing 21 games for the Knights, and, following disagreements with coach Chris McSorley, he was traded to the Manchester Storm in exchange for Rick Brebant. Duthie returned to Merano for the 2000-01 season and stayed in Italy the following season, playing for HC Milano.

Duthie joined the WPHL's Fresno Falcons for the 2002-03 season and had a short stint with 2nd Bundesliga side EC Bad Nauheim. He returned to Serie A for the 2003-04 season, this time playing for the HC Pustertal, and finished his career with Oberliga side Heilbronner Falken.

=== International career ===
During the 1996-97 Season, Duthie was a member of the Canadian National Team, competing in tournaments such as the Deutschland Cup, Spengler Cup and Sweden Hockey Games.

== Career statistics ==
=== Regular season and playoffs ===
			Regular season					Playoffs
Season	Team	League	GP	G	A	Pts	PIM	GP	G	A	Pts	PIM
1991–92	Spokane Chiefs	WHL	67	23	37	60	119	10	5	10	15	18
1992–93	Spokane Chiefs	WHL	60	26	58	84	122	9	7	2	9	8
1993–94	Spokane Chiefs	WHL	71	57	69	126	126	3	3	5	8	11
1994-95	Saint John Flames	AHL	72	18	21	39	70	2	0	0	0	0
1995-96	Adirondack Red Wings	AHL	52	16	21	37	36	3	1	0	1	2
1996-97	Minnesota Moose	IHL	4	0	0	0	2	—	—	—	—	—
1997-98	Tappara	SM-Liiga	21	1	1	2	20	—	—	—	—	—
	Lukko	SM-Liiga	20	5	5	10	16	—	—	—	—	—
1998-99	HC Merano	Serie A	26	14	27	41	20	—	—	—	—	—
	HC Merano	Alpenliga	32	16	21	37	30	—	—	—	—	—
1999-00	London Knights	BISL	21	6	15	21	16	—	—	—	—	—
	Manchester Storm	BISL	20	4	15	19	14	6	1	4	5	6
2000-01	HC Merano	Serie A	32	11	19	30	20	13	7	9	16	12
2001-02	Milano Vipers	Serie A	8	5	3	8	0	—	—	—	—	—
2002-03	Fresno Falcons	WCHL	27	9	14	23	42	—	—	—	—	—
	EC Bad Nauheim	2nd Bundesliga	5	1	0	1	2	2	2	0	2	4
2003-04	HC Pustertal	Serie A	19	9	16	25	24	6	3	3	6	4
2005-06	Heilbronner Falken	Oberliga	18	9	12	21	26	4	1	2	3	4

=== International ===
			Regular season					Playoffs
Season	Team	Event	GP	G	A	Pts	PIM	GP	G	A	Pts	PIM
1996-97	Canada	INT	57	18	37	55	41	—	—	—	—	—

== Awards ==
- WHL West First All-Star Team – 1994
