= 1992–93 WHL season =

Junior ice hockey season

- League: Western Hockey League
- Sport: Ice hockey
- Teams: 16

Regular season
- Scotty Munro Memorial Trophy: Swift Current Broncos (2)
- Season MVP: Jason Krywulak (Swift Current Broncos)
- Top scorer: Jason Krywulak (Swift Current Broncos)

Playoffs
- Playoffs MVP: Andrew Schneider (Broncos)
- Finals champions: Swift Current Broncos (2)
- Runners-up: Portland Winter Hawks

WHL seasons
- 1991–92 1993–94

1992–93 CHL season
- League: Canadian Hockey League
- Sport: Ice hockey
- Teams: 44

OHL

QMJHL

WHL

Memorial Cup
- Finals champions: Sault Ste. Marie Greyhounds (OHL) (1st title)
- Runners-up: Peterborough Petes (OHL)

The 1992–93 WHL season was the 27th season of the Western Hockey League (WHL). The season featured sixteen teams and a 72-game regular season. The Swift Current Broncos won both the Scotty Munro Memorial Trophy for best regular season record and the President's Cup as playoff champions, both for the second time after first winning each trophy in the 1988–89 season.

The Red Deer Rebels joined the WHL as its sixteenth franchise.

== Team changes ==
- The Red Deer Rebels join the WHL as an expansion team.

== Regular season ==
=== Final standings ===
East Division
| Pos | Team | Pld | W | L | T | GF | GA | Pts |
|---|---|---|---|---|---|---|---|---|
| 1 | x – Swift Current Broncos | 72 | 49 | 21 | 2 | 384 | 267 | 100 |
| 2 | x – Brandon Wheat Kings | 72 | 43 | 25 | 4 | 347 | 258 | 90 |
| 3 | x – Saskatoon Blades | 72 | 42 | 27 | 3 | 311 | 236 | 87 |
| 4 | x – Regina Pats | 72 | 35 | 36 | 1 | 322 | 313 | 71 |
| 5 | x – Lethbridge Hurricanes | 72 | 33 | 36 | 3 | 317 | 328 | 69 |
| 6 | x – Red Deer Rebels | 72 | 31 | 39 | 2 | 284 | 329 | 64 |
| 7 | x – Medicine Hat Tigers | 72 | 29 | 38 | 5 | 285 | 343 | 63 |
| 8 | Moose Jaw Warriors | 72 | 27 | 42 | 3 | 277 | 326 | 57 |
| 9 | Prince Albert Raiders | 72 | 25 | 42 | 5 | 252 | 317 | 55 |

x – qualified for playoffs

West Division
| Pos | Team | Pld | W | L | T | GF | GA | Pts |
|---|---|---|---|---|---|---|---|---|
| 1 | x – Portland Winter Hawks | 72 | 45 | 24 | 3 | 343 | 277 | 93 |
| 2 | x – Tacoma Rockets | 72 | 45 | 27 | 0 | 324 | 259 | 90 |
| 3 | x – Kamloops Blazers | 72 | 42 | 28 | 2 | 302 | 253 | 86 |
| 4 | x – Seattle Thunderbirds | 72 | 31 | 38 | 3 | 234 | 292 | 65 |
| 5 | x – Spokane Chiefs | 72 | 28 | 40 | 4 | 311 | 319 | 60 |
| 6 | x – Tri-City Americans | 72 | 28 | 41 | 3 | 245 | 312 | 59 |
| 7 | Victoria Cougars | 72 | 20 | 49 | 3 | 217 | 326 | 43 |

x – qualified for playoffs

=== Scoring leaders ===
Note: GP = Games played; G = Goals; A = Assists; Pts = Points; PIM = Penalties in minutes

| Player | Team | GP | G | A | Pts | PIM |
|---|---|---|---|---|---|---|
| Jason Krywulak | Swift Current Broncos | 72 | 81 | 81 | 162 | 58 |
| Valeri Bure | Spokane Chiefs | 66 | 68 | 79 | 147 | 49 |
| Rick Girard | Swift Current Broncos | 72 | 71 | 70 | 141 | 25 |
| Louis Dumont | Regina Pats | 72 | 62 | 59 | 121 | 97 |
| Domenic Pittis | Lethbridge Hurricanes | 66 | 46 | 73 | 119 | 69 |
| Todd Holt | Swift Current Broncos | 67 | 56 | 57 | 113 | 90 |
| Allan Egeland | Tacoma Rockets | 71 | 56 | 57 | 113 | 119 |
| Dean Tiltgen | Red Deer Rebels | 72 | 50 | 61 | 111 | 33 |
| Ryan Fujita | Saskatoon Blades | 72 | 56 | 54 | 110 | 105 |
| Mike Mathers | Kamloops Blazers | 69 | 52 | 56 | 108 | 63 |

== 1993 WHL Playoffs ==
First Round
E1 | Swift Current | bye
E2 | Brandon | 1
E7 | Medicine Hat | 3
E3 | Saskatoon | 3
E6 | Red Deer | 1
E4 | Regina | 3
E5 | Lethbridge | 1
W1 | Portland | 4
W6 | Tri-City | 0
W2 | Tacoma | 3
W5 | Spokane | 4
W3 | Kamloops | 4
W4 | Seattle | 1

Division Semi-Finals
E1 | Swift Current | 4
E7 | Medicine Hat | 2
E3 | Saskatoon | 1
E4 | Regina | 4
W1 | Portland | bye
W3 | Kamloops | 3
W5 | Spokane | 0

Division Finals
E1 | Swift Current | 4
E4 | Regina | 0
W1 | Portland | 4
W3 | Kamloops | 1

WHL Championship
E1 | Swift Current | 4
W1 | Portland | 3

=== Division quarter-finals ===
==== East Division ====
===== (2) Brandon Wheat Kings vs. (7) Medicine Hat Tigers =====
| March 26 | Medicine Hat Tigers | 2 – 3 | OT | Brandon Wheat Kings | Keystone Centre |
| 2:34 - sh - Jamie Linden (1) | | First period | | No scoring |
| No scoring | | Second period | | No scoring |
| 1:28 - Cam Danyluk (1) | | Third period | | 14:43 - Aris Brimanis (1); 18:30 - Aris Brimanis (2) |
| No scoring | | First overtime period | | 12:35 - pp - Marty Murray (1) |
| Sonny Mignacca (53 saves/56 shots) | | Goalie stats | | Trevor Robins (46 saves/48 shots) |

| March 27 | Medicine Hat Tigers | 2 – 1 | Brandon Wheat Kings | Keystone Centre |
| No scoring | | First period | 5:22 - Mike Maneluk (1) |
| 12:27 - Cam Danyluk (2) | | Second period | No scoring |
| 3:52 - Lorne Toews (1) | | Third period | No scoring |
| Trevor Robins (28 saves/30 shots) | | Goalie stats | Sonny Mignacca (40 saves/41 shots) |

| March 29 | Brandon Wheat Kings | 1 – 4 | Medicine Hat Tigers | Medicine Hat Arena |
| No scoring | | First period | No scoring |
| 15:23 - pp - Bobby House (1) | | Second period | 2:39 - David Cooper (1); 8:09 - Clayton Norris (1) |
| No scoring | | Third period | 1:46 - Mark Polak (1); 19:32 - pp - en - Mike Jickling (1) |
| Trevor Robins (31 saves/34 shots) | | Goalie stats | Sonny Mignacca (31 saves/32 shots) |

| March 30 | Brandon Wheat Kings | 3 – 4 | OT | Medicine Hat Tigers | Medicine Hat Arena |
| No scoring | | First period | | No scoring |
| 14:33 - pp - Bobby House (2) | | Second period | | 18:48 - Lorne Toews (2) |
| 9:28 - Mike Maneluk (2); 17:27 - Jeff Hoad (1) | | Third period | | 7:59 - Mike Jickling (2); 9:13 - Clayton Norris (2) |
| No scoring | | First overtime period | | 5:29 - Stacy Roest (1) |
| Trevor Robins (33 saves/37 shots) | | Goalie stats | | Sonny Mignacca (26 saves/29 shots) |

| Medicine Hat wins series 3 – 1 |

===== (3) Saskatoon Blades vs. (6) Red Deer Rebels =====
| March 26 | Red Deer Rebels | 2 – 1 | OT | Saskatoon Blades | Saskatchewan Place |
| 2:55 - pp - Craig Reichert (1) | | First period | | No scoring |
| No scoring | | Second period | | 2:03 - pp - Derek Tibbatts (1) |
| No scoring | | Third period | | No scoring |
| 19:26 - Darren Van Impe (1) | | First overtime period | | No scoring |
| Mark Dawkins (37 saves/38 shots) | | Goalie stats | | Norm Maracle (42 saves/44 shots) |

| March 27 | Red Deer Rebels | 4 – 5 | Saskatoon Blades | Saskatchewan Place |
| No scoring | | First period | 3:43 - Mark Wotton (1); 13:03 - Clarke Wilm (1); 16:44 - Mike Gray (1) |
| 10:53 - Tony Vlastelic (1); 12:53 - Scott Adair (1); 17:52 - Darren Van Impe (2) | | Second period | 1:11 - pp - Paul Buczkowski (1) |
| 19:10 - Brian Loney (1) | | Third period | 14:55 - pp - Shane Calder (1) |
| Mark Dawkins (33 saves/38 shots) | | Goalie stats | Norm Maracle (25 saves/29 shots) |

| March 29 | Saskatoon Blades | 3 – 2 | OT | Red Deer Rebels | Red Deer Centrium |
| No scoring | | First period | | No scoring |
| No scoring | | Second period | | 14:23 - Curtis Cardinal (1) |
| 0:12 - Andrew Kemper (1); 8:40 - Clarke Wilm (2) | | Third period | | 9:27 - Craig Reichert (2) |
| 9:52 - Frank Banham (1) | | First overtime period | | No scoring |
| Norm Maracle (34 saves/36 shots) | | Goalie stats | | Mark Dawkins (34 saves/37 shots) |

| March 30 | Saskatoon Blades | 5 – 3 | Red Deer Rebels | Red Deer Centrium |
| No scoring | | First period | 9:38 - Ken Richardson (1); 19:25 - Dean Tiltgen (1) |
| 4:16 - Andy MacIntyre (1); 12:46 - James Startup (1) | | Second period | No scoring |
| 3:30 - Frank Banham (2); 15:00 - pp - Mark Wotton (2); 19:41 - Ryan Fujita (1) | | Third period | 5:45 - pp - Craig Reichert (3) |
| Norm Maracle (33 saves/36 shots) | | Goalie stats | Mark Dawkins (24 shots/29 saves) |

| Saskatoon wins series 3 – 1 |

===== (4) Regina Pats vs. (5) Lethbridge Hurricanes =====
| March 26 | Lethbridge Hurricanes | 4 – 3 | OT | Regina Pats | Regina Agridome |
| 6:26 - sh - Mark Szoke (1) | | First period | | 4:32 - Russ Gronick (1); 9:56 - sh - Louis Dumont (1) |
| 8:35 - Nick Polychronopoulos (1) | | Second period | | 4:38 - pp - Brandon Coates (1) |
| 5:26 - Domenic Pittis (1) | | Third period | | No scoring |
| 2:08 - Ivan Vologjaninov (1) | | First overtime period | | No scoring |
| Darcy Austin (34 saves/37 shots) | | Goalie stats | | Mike Risdale (38 shots/41 saves) |

| March 27 | Lethbridge Hurricanes | 4 – 5 | Regina Pats | Regina Agridome |
| 7:34 - pp - Shane Peacock (1) | | First period | 1:14 - pp - Karry Biette (1); 4:08 - pp - Brandon Coates (2); 9:36 - Nathan Dempsey (1) |
| 14:25 - Shane Peacock (2); 17:00 - Domenic Pittis (2); 18:38 - Todd MacIsaac (1) | | Second period | 0:08 - Nathan Dempsey (2) |
| No scoring | | Third period | 0:56 - Grayden Reid (1) |
| Darcy Austin (33 saves/38 shots) | | Goalie stats | Mike Risdale (27 saves/31 shots) |

| March 29 | Regina Pats | 7 – 6 | Lethbridge Hurricanes | Canada Games Sportsplex |
| No scoring | | First period | 15:45 - Mark Szoke (2) |
| 1:08 - Brandon Coates (3); 4:33 - pp - Karry Biette (2); 18:55 - pp - Louis Dumont (2) | | Second period | 9:36 - pp - Brad Zimmer (1); 10:01 - Mark Szoke (3); 11:12 - pp - Domenic Pittis (3); 18:05 - Shane Peacock (3) |
| 1:37 - Trevor Hanas (1); 8:54 - Jeff Friesen (1); 9:18 - Trevor Hanas (2); 19:01 - Jeff Friesen (2) | | Third period | 6:52 - Cory Dosdall (1) |
| Mike Risdale (41 saves/47 shots) | | Goalie stats | Darcy Austin (35 saves/42 shots) |

| March 30 | Regina Pats | 2 – 1 | 2OT | Lethbridge Hurricanes | Canada Games Sportsplex |
| No scoring | | First period | | 9:47 - Shane Peacock (4) |
| No scoring | | Second period | | No scoring |
| 19:54 - Karry Biette (3) | | Third period | | No scoring |
| 3:33 - Trevor Hanas (3) | | Second overtime period | | No scoring |
| Mike Risdale (32 saves/33 shots) | | Goalie stats | | Darcy Austin (43 saves/45 shots) |

| Regina wins series 3 – 1 |

==== West Division ====
===== (1) Portland Winter Hawks vs. (6) Tri-City Americans =====
| March 27 | Tri-City Americans | 1 – 5 | Portland Winter Hawks | Veterans Memorial Coliseum |
| No scoring | | First period | 4:23 - Brandon Smith (1); 10:40 - sh - Jason Wiemer (1); 18:20 - Colin Foley (1) |
| 12:53 - Tony Prpic (1) | | Second period | No scoring |
| No scoring | | Third period | 4:53 - Scott Nichol (1); 5:33 - Nicholas Vachon (1) |
| David Brumby (50 saves/55 shots) | | Goalie stats | Scott Langkow (29 saves/30 shots) |

| March 28 | Tri-City Americans | 2 – 7 | Portland Winter Hawks | Veterans Memorial Coliseum |
| No scoring | | First period | 7:28 - pp Layne Roland (1); 7:35 - Adam Deadmarsh (1); 14:02 - Layne Roland (2) |
| No scoring | | Second period | 16:06 - Nicholas Vachon (2) |
| 0:49 - Chad Cabana (1); 17:34 - Brent Ascroft (1) | | Third period | 0:12 - Lonny Bohonos (1); 3:53 - Scott Nichol (2); 14:55 - pp - Scott Nichol (3) |
| David Brumby (36 saves/43 shots) | | Goalie stats | Scott Langkow (22 saves/23 shots); Joaquin Gage (3 saves/4 shots) |

| March 30 | Portland Winter Hawks | 4 – 3 | Tri-City Americans | Tri-Cities Coliseum |
| 14:11 - pp - Layne Roland (3) | | First period | 9:36 - pp - Evan Marble (1) |
| 3:39 - pp - Nicholas Vachon (3); 10:20 - Jason Wiemer (2) | | Second period | 9:08 - pp - Jason Renard (1) |
| 9:11 - John Badduke (1) | | Third period | 2:44 - Jason Bowen (1) |
| Scott Langkow (38 saves/41 shots) | | Goalie stats | David Brumby (25 saves/29 shots) |

| April 2 | Portland Winter Hawks | 4 – 3 | Tri-City Americans | Tri-Cities Coliseum |
| No scoring | | First period | 12:26 - pp - Todd Klassen (1); 17:01 - Daymond Langkow (1) |
| 13:45 - pp - Jiri Beranek (1); 17:58 - Nolan Pratt (1) | | Second period | No scoring |
| 7:18 - Cale Hulse (1); 15:49 - Shannon Briske (1) | | Third period | 10:41 - Geoff Lynch (1) |
| Joaquin Gage (32 saves/35 shots) | | Goalie stats | David Brumby (24 saves/28 shots) |

| Portland wins series 4 – 0 |

== All-Star game ==
On January 19, a combined WHL/OHL all-star team defeated the QMJHL all-stars 7–5 at Montreal, Quebec before a crowd of 4,355.

== WHL awards ==
Most Valuable Player - Four Broncos Memorial Trophy: Jason Krywulak, Swift Current Broncos
Scholastic Player of the Year - Daryl K. (Doc) Seaman Trophy: David Trofimenkoff, Lethbridge Hurricanes
Top Scorer - Bob Clarke Trophy: Jason Krywulak, Swift Current Broncos
Most Sportsmanlike Player - Brad Hornung Trophy: Rick Girard, Swift Current Broncos
Top Defenseman - Bill Hunter Trophy: Jason Smith, Regina Pats
Rookie of the Year - Jim Piggott Memorial Trophy: Jeff Friesen, Regina Pats
Top Goaltender - Del Wilson Trophy: Trevor Robins, Brandon Wheat Kings
Coach of the Year - Dunc McCallum Memorial Trophy: Marcel Comeau, Tacoma Rockets
Executive of the Year - Lloyd Saunders Memorial Trophy: Bruce Hamilton, Tacoma Rockets
Regular season Champions - Scotty Munro Memorial Trophy: Swift Current Broncos
Marketing/Public Relations Award - St. Clair Group Trophy: Rick Dillabough, Brandon Wheat Kings
WHL Humanitarian of the Year - Jamie Pushor, Lethbridge Hurricanes
WHL Plus-Minus Award: Mark Wotton, Saskatoon Blades
WHL Playoff Most Valuable Player: Andrew Schneider, Swift Current Broncos

== All-Star teams ==
East Division
| | First Team | | Second Team | |
|---|---|---|---|---|
| Goal | Trevor Robins | Brandon Wheat Kings | Norm Maracle | Saskatoon Blades |
| Defense | Jason Smith | Regina Pats | Mike Rathje | Medicine Hat Tigers |
| Defense | Darren Van Impe | Red Deer Rebels | Brent Bilodeau | Swift Current Broncos |
| Forward | Jeff Shantz | Regina Pats | Louis Dumont | Regina Pats |
| Forward | Jason Krywulak | Swift Current Broncos | Bobby House | Brandon Wheat Kings |
| Forward | Rick Girard | Swift Current Broncos | Andrew Schneider | Swift Current Broncos |
| Forward | Rob Niedermayer | Medicine Hat Tigers | - | - |
West Division
| | First Team | | Second Team | |
| Goal | Steve Passmore | Kamloops Blazers | Jeff Calvert | Tacoma Rockets |
| Defense | Michal Sýkora | Tacoma Rockets | Bryan McCabe | Spokane Chiefs |
| Defense | Brendan Witt | Seattle Thunderbirds | Brandon Smith | Portland Winter Hawks |
| Forward | Allan Egeland | Tacoma Rockets | Jamie Black | Tacoma Rockets |
| Forward | Valeri Bure | Spokane Chiefs | Colin Foley | Portland Winter Hawks |
| Forward | Mike Mathers | Kamloops Blazers | Craig Lyons | Kamloops Blazers |

== See also ==
- 1993 Memorial Cup
- 1993 NHL entry draft
- 1992 in sports
- 1993 in sports

| Preceded by 1991–92 WHL season | WHL seasons | Succeeded by 1993–94 WHL season |
