= Sonny Mignacca =

Canadian ice hockey player

- Born: January 4, 1974 (age 52) Winnipeg, MAN
- Height: 5 ft 8 in (173 cm)
- Weight: 178 lb (81 kg; 12 st 10 lb)
- Position: Goaltender
- Played for: WPHL; Tupelo T-Rex; BISL; London Knights; Basingstoke Bison; ECHL; Tallahassee Tiger Sharks; Raleigh Icecaps; Wheeling Thunderbirds; AHL; Syracuse Crunch
- NHL draft: 213 overall, 1992; Vancouver Canucks
- Playing career: 1994–2000

Sonny Mignacca (born January 4, 1974) is a Canadian retired professional ice hockey goaltender.

== Playing career ==
Mignacca played major junior with the Medicine Hat Tigers of the Western Hockey League, beginning in 1990–91. In 1993–94, he was awarded the Four Broncos Memorial Trophy as league MVP after posting a 3.27 GAA and a 26-23-5 record. Mignacca was drafted two years prior by the Vancouver Canucks 213th overall in the 1992 NHL entry draft.

After graduating from major junior, Mignacca was assigned to the Syracuse Crunch of the American Hockey League, the Canucks' minor league affiliate. Two years later, he joined the Tallahassee Tiger Sharks of the East Coast Hockey League. He spent one season in Tallahassee before going overseas to play in the British Ice Hockey Superleague for two seasons. Mignacca returned to North America and played one last season in the Western Professional Hockey League with the Tupelo T-Rex before retiring from professional hockey.

== Awards ==
- Awarded the Four Broncos Memorial Trophy as WHL MVP in 1994
- WHL East Second All-Star Team – 1992 & 1994

== Career statistics ==
=== Regular season and playoffs ===
			Regular season										Playoffs
Season	Team	League	GP	W	L	T	OTL	MIN	GA	SO	GAA	SV%	GP	W	L	MIN	GA	SO	GAA	SV%
1990–91	Medicine Hat Tigers	WHL	33	17	9	2	—	1743	121	0	4.17		—	—	—	—	—	—	—	—
1991–92	Medicine Hat Tigers	WHL	56	35	19	0	—	3207	189	2	3.54		4						4.25	.864
1992–93	Medicine Hat Tigers	WHL	50				—	2724	210	1	4.63	.870	10						3.76	.902
1993–94	Medicine Hat Tigers	WHL	60	26	23	5	—	3381	183	2	3.27	.901	3						5.67	.841
1994–95	Syracuse Crunch	AHL	19	4	11	2	—	1097	85	0	4.65	.863	—	—	—	—	—	—	—	—
1995–96	Syracuse Crunch	AHL	8	2	5	0	—	377	26	0	4.14	.870	—	—	—	—	—	—	—	—
1995–96	Raleigh IceCaps	ECHL	5	1	2	—	2	298	15	0	3.02	.886	—	—	—	—	—	—	—	—
1995–96	Wheeling Thunderbirds	ECHL	1	1	0	—	0	60	2	0	2.00	.939	—	—	—	—	—	—	—	—
1996–97	Tallahassee Tiger Sharks	ECHL	38	19	12	5	—	2027	109	4	3.23	.887	3	0	2	132	8	0	3.64	.882
1997–98	Basingstoke Bison	GBR	17				—	934	51		3.28	.905	—	—	—	—	—	—	—	—
1998–99	London Knights	GBR	9				—				4.77	.867	—	—	—	—	—	—	—	—
1999–2000	Tupelo T-Rex	WPHL	14	1	7	5	—	759	55		4.35	.868	—	—	—	—	—	—	—	—
AHL totals			27	6	16	2	—	1474	111	0	4.52	.865	—	—	—	—	—	—	—	—
ECHL totals			44	21	14	5	2	2385	126	4	3.17	.888	—	—	—	—	—	—	—	—
