= Colin Priestner =

Canadian hockey executive, musician, and athlete

- Birth name: Colin Priestner
- Born: January 8, 1984 (age 41); London, Ontario, Canada
- Genres: Rock
- Occupation(s): Singer-songwriter, musician, athlete
- Instrument: Vocals
- Years active: 2005–present
- Labels: Independent
- Website: www.twitter.com/colinpriestner

Colin Priestner (born January 8, 1984) is a Canadian hockey executive, singer/songwriter, and athlete.

== Career ==
Colin is part-owner, Managing Partner and General Manager of the Saskatoon Blades Hockey Club of the Western Hockey League.

=== Music ===
Priestner's first record, Blatant Hypocrite, was independently released in 2005. It was followed in November 2006 with God and Wall Street. Despite critical acclaim and airplay in Canada, the album had little commercial success. In the fall of 2006, Priestner toured with Dan Bern during Bern's "Breathe" tour,

Following the disappointing sales of God and Wall Street, Priestner abandoned his music career and began working as a car salesman. After four years, during which time he became the Vice President of Norden Volkswagen Volkswagen, Priestner wrote and starred in "Shit Edmontonians Say," a parody video that spoofed Edmonton, Alberta. It went viral and generated over 300,000 views in 24 hours. The video, which featured cameos from Edmonton Oilers Jordan Eberle and Ryan Nugent-Hopkins as well as other local celebrities, was featured on the front page of the Edmonton Sun and received significant coverage in other media, including regional news programs. and new programs throughout the month.

Buoyed by the success of "Shit Edmontonians Say", Priestner returned to the stage in 2012 to perform at the Royal Alberta Museum Theatre. Soon after that, he left his job and began work on a new album. It will be recorded in Vancouver with Grammy Award winning producer Chin Injeti, the album is due for release in 2014.

=== Tennis ===
Priestner was a top ranked junior tennis player, placed 5th in the Men's Open in Alberta, and was a participant in the Canadian National Junior Tennis Championships in 2000 and 2002. In 2002, he received a tennis scholarship to Eastern Illinois University, a Division 1 NCAA school. He played competitively for the Panthers for two years.

=== Hockey Management ===
Priestner was appointed the Blades general manager in 2016, prior to being elevated to both president and general manager in April 2019. The Blades have posted a record of 294-166-31-12 under his leadership as of 2024.

== Personal life ==
Priestner's father, Mike Priestner, was a former WHL goaltender and is the majority owner of the Saskatoon Blades Hockey Club; his aunt, Cathy Priestner-Allinger won a silver medal in the 1976 Winter Olympics in speed skating and was the Director of Sport for the 2002 and 2010 Winter Olympic Games. Colin married his long-time girlfriend Alanna Bateup on June 22, 2013, in Vancouver.
