= Louis Dumont (ice hockey) =

Canadian ice hockey player and general manager

- Born: January 30, 1973 (age 53) Calgary, Alberta, Canada
- Height: 5 ft 10 in (178 cm)
- Weight: 181 lb (82 kg; 12 st 13 lb)
- Position: Centre
- Shot: Right
- Played for: AHL; Syracuse Crunch; Lowell Lock Monsters; IHL; Manitoba Moose; ECHL; Wheeling Thunderbirds; Tallahassee Tiger Sharks; Louisiana IceGators; Augusta Lynx; Pensacola Ice Pilots; Mississippi Sea Wolves; Utah Grizzlies; BISL; Ayr Scottish Eagles; CHL; Memphis Riverkings; Mississippi RiverKings
- NHL draft: Undrafted
- Playing career: 1994–2011

Louis Dumont (born January 30, 1973) is a Canadian former professional ice hockey player. He was the general manager for Louisiana IceGators of the Southern Professional Hockey League (SPHL). A career minor leaguer, Dumont is the ECHL's top all-time career scorer with 890 points.

On May 21, 2011, following a 17-year career as a professional hockey player, Dumont retired to take on the role of general manager for the Louisiana IceGators of the Southern Professional Hockey League (SPHL)

== Awards ==
- WHL East Second All-Star Team – 1993
