= 2007–08 WHL season =

- League: Western Hockey League
- Sport: Ice hockey
- Duration: Regular season September 20, 2007 – March 16, 2008; Playoffs; March 21 – May 7, 2008
- Teams: 22
- TV partner: Shaw TV

Regular season
- Scotty Munro Memorial Trophy: Tri-City Americans (1)
- Season MVP: Karl Alzner (Calgary Hitmen)
- Top scorer: Mark Santorelli (Chilliwack Bruins)

Playoffs
- Playoffs MVP: Tyler Johnson (Chiefs)
- Finals champions: Spokane Chiefs (2)
- Runners-up: Lethbridge Hurricanes

WHL seasons
- 2006–07 2008–09

2007–08 CHL season
- League: Canadian Hockey League
- Sport: Hockey
- Duration: OHL; Sept. 19, 2007 – Mar. 16, 2008; QMJHL; Sept. 13, 2007 – Mar. 16, 2008; WHL; Sept. 20, 2007 – Mar. 16, 2008
- Teams: 60
- TV partner(s): RDS; Rogers Sportsnet; Rogers TV; Shaw TV
- Season MVP: Justin Azevedo (Kitchener Rangers) (OHL)
- Top scorer: Justin Azevedo (Kitchener Rangers) (OHL)

Memorial Cup
- Finals champions: Spokane Chiefs (WHL) (2nd title)
- Runners-up: Kitchener Rangers (OHL)

The 2007–08 WHL season was the 42nd season of the Western Hockey League (WHL). The regular season began on September 20, 2007, and ended on March 16, 2008. The Tri-City Americans won the Scotty Munro Memorial Trophy for the best regular season record. The playoffs began on March 21, and ended on May 7, with the Spokane Chiefs defeating the Lethbridge Hurricanes in the championship series to claim their second Ed Chynoweth Cup and a berth at the 2008 Memorial Cup tournament, which Spokane would go on to win.

The Edmonton Oil Kings joined the league as an expansion club—their name paying homage to Edmonton's original WHL team—bringing the WHL to 22 teams.

== League notes ==
- The WHL had announced at the 2007 Memorial Cup tournament that it would rename its championship trophy—until then, known as the President's Cup—after Ed Chynoweth. The Chiefs 2008 championship was thus the first featuring the renamed trophy.
- The Edmonton Oil Kings joined the Central Division of the Eastern Conference, bringing the Eastern Conference to twelve teams, while the Western Conference remained at ten.
- The playoff format was revised so that the top eight teams in each conference qualify for the playoffs, as opposed to the top four in each division. Division winners are guaranteed a top two seed in each conference.

== Final standings ==
Map of WHL, 2007–08 to 2010–11
East Division
Central Division
BC Division
US Division

Note: GP = Games played; W = Wins; L = Losses; OTL = Overtime losses; SOL = Shootout losses; GF = Goals for; GA = Goals against; Pts = Points; x = Clinched playoff berth; y = Clinched conference title

=== Eastern Conference ===
Rank	East Division	GP	W	L	OTL	SOL	GF	GA	Pts
2	Regina Pats^{x}	72	44	22	4	2	217	206	94
6	Brandon Wheat Kings^{x}	72	42	24	3	3	253	209	90
7	Swift Current Broncos^{x}	72	41	24	1	6	244	205	89
8	Moose Jaw Warriors^{x}	72	37	21	6	8	229	214	88
9	Saskatoon Blades	72	29	34	3	6	182	229	67
10	Prince Albert Raiders	72	26	41	3	2	196	248	57

Rank	Central Division	GP	W	L	OTL	SOL	GF	GA	Pts
1	Calgary Hitmen^{y}	72	47	20	1	4	259	166	99
3	Lethbridge Hurricanes^{x}	72	45	21	2	4	245	175	96
4	Medicine Hat Tigers^{x}	72	43	22	5	2	234	198	93
5	Kootenay Ice^{x}	72	42	22	5	3	229	214	92
11	Edmonton Oil Kings	72	22	39	4	7	162	241	55
12	Red Deer Rebels	72	18	47	4	3	145	255	43

=== Western Conference ===
Rank	B.C. Division	GP	W	L	OTL	SOL	GF	GA	Pts
2	Vancouver Giants^{x}	72	49	15	2	6	250	155	106
5	Kelowna Rockets^{x}	72	38	26	2	6	248	215	84
7	Chilliwack Bruins^{x}	72	28	35	4	5	206	241	65
8	Kamloops Blazers^{x}	72	27	41	2	2	197	253	58
9	Prince George Cougars	72	20	48	1	3	172	304	44

Rank	U.S. Division	GP	W	L	OTL	SOL	GF	GA	Pts
1	Tri-City Americans^{y}	72	52	16	2	2	262	176	108
3	Spokane Chiefs^{x}	72	50	15	1	6	251	160	107
4	Seattle Thunderbirds^{x}	72	42	23	5	2	241	179	91
6	Everett Silvertips^{x}	72	39	30	0	3	205	198	81
10	Portland Winter Hawks	72	11	58	2	1	132	318	25

== Scoring leaders ==
Note: GP = Games played; G = Goals; A = Assists; Pts = Points; PIM = Penalty minutes

Player	Team	GP	G	A	Pts	PIM
Mark Santorelli	Chilliwack Bruins	72	27	74	101	40
Colin Long	Kelowna Rockets	72	31	69	100	41
Colton Yellow Horn	Tri-City Americans	67	48	49	97	63
Tyler Ennis	Medicine Hat Tigers	70	43	48	91	42
Steve DaSilva	Kootenay Ice	68	40	49	89	47
Mitch Fadden	Lethbridge Hurricanes	72	34	55	89	72
Jordan Knackstedt	Moose Jaw Warriors	72	31	54	85	116
Dan Gendur	Everett Silvertips	60	29	55	84	68
Bud Holloway	Seattle Thunderbirds	70	43	40	83	55
Oscar Moller	Chilliwack Bruins	63	39	44	83	42

== Leading goaltenders ==
Note: GP = Games played; Min = Minutes played; W = Wins; L = Losses; SOL = Shootout losses; GA = Goals against; SO = Total shutouts; SV% = Save percentage; GAA = Goals against average

Player	Team	GP	Min	W	L	OTL	SL	GA	SO	SV%	GAA
Tyson Sexsmith	Vancouver Giants	62	3678	43	11	2	6	116	9	.911	1.89
Juha Metsola	Lethbridge Hurricanes	30	1693	20	7	0	1	56	3	.916	1.98
Dustin Tokarski	Spokane Chiefs	45	2543	30	10	0	3	87	6	.922	2.05
Martin Jones	Calgary Hitmen	27	1529	18	8	0	1	54	1	.911	2.12
Kevin Armstrong	Spokane Chiefs	33	1840	20	5	1	3	66	2	.915	2.15

== 2008 WHL Playoffs ==
=== Overview ===
Conference Quarter-finals	Conference Semi-finals
1	Calgary	4
8	Moose Jaw	2
1	Calgary	4
7	Swift Current	2
2	Regina	2
7	Swift Current	4
Eastern
3	Lethbridge	4
6	Brandon	2
3	Lethbridge	4
5	Kootenay	1
4	Medicine Hat	1
5	Kootenay	4
1	Tri-City	4
8	Kamloops	0
1	Tri-City	4
4	Seattle	1
4	Seattle	4
5	Kelowna	3
Western
2	Vancouver	4
7	Chilliwack	0
2	Vancouver	2
3	Spokane	4
3	Spokane	4
6	Everett	0

Conference Finals
1	Calgary	0
3	Lethbridge	4
1	Tri-City	3
3	Spokane	4

WHL Championship
E3	Lethbridge	0
W3	Spokane	4

=== Conference quarter-finals ===
==== (E1) Calgary Hitmen vs. (E8) Moose Jaw Warriors ====
March 21	Calgary Hitmen	5 – 1	Moose Jaw Warriors	Scotiabank Saddledome
3:01 - Ryan Gillen (1); 3:53 - pp - Paul Postma (1)		First period	No scoring
6:58 - Ryan White (1)		Second period	Riley Holzapfel (1) - pp - 14:47
6:02 - pp - Kyle Bortis (1); 14:28 - pp - Karl Alzner (1)		Third period	No scoring
Daniel Spence (18 saves / 19 shots)		Goalie stats	Joey Perricone (33 saves / 38 shots)

March 23	Calgary Hitmen	2 – 4	Moose Jaw Warriors	Scotiabank Saddledome
8:25 - pp - Brandon Kozun (1); 15:12 - Brock Nixon (1)		First period	No scoring
No scoring		Second period	Chad Suer (1) - pp - 6:55; Terrance Delaronde (1) - 16:51; Neal Prokop (1) - 17:19; Jason Bast (1) - pp - 19:47
No scoring		Third period	No scoring
Daniel Spence (22 saves / 26 shots)		Goalie stats	Joey Perricone (29 saves / 31 shots)

March 25	Moose Jaw Warriors	3 – 8	Calgary Hitmen	Moose Jaw Civic Centre
9:51 - Riley Holzapfel (2); 11:58 - pp - Frazer McLaren (1)		First period	Ian Schultz (1) - pp - 3:00
16:22 - Jason Bast (2)		Second period	Brock Nixon (2) - pp - 9:37; Paul Postma (2) - pp - 10:07; Brandon Kozun (2) - 16:43; Brock Nixon (3) - 17:00
No scoring		Third period	Karl Alzner (2) - pp - 8:11; Kyle Bortis (2) - 14:00; Matt MacKenzie (1) - pp - 16:37
Joey Perricone (29 saves / 37 shots)		Goalie stats	Daniel Spence (21 saves / 24 shots)

March 26	Moose Jaw Warriors	1 – 3	Calgary Hitmen	Moose Jaw Civic Centre
No scoring		First period	No scoring
6:02 - pp - Ty Wishart (1)		Second period	Brandon Kozun (3) - 13:21
No scoring		Third period	TJ Galiardi (1) - 2:44; Kyle Bortis (3) - 13:44
Joey Perricone (33 saves / 36 shots)		Goalie stats	Daniel Spence (24 saves / 25 shots)

March 28	Calgary Hitmen	2 – 4	Moose Jaw Warriors	Scotiabank Saddledome
No scoring		First period	Jason Bast (3) - pp - 10:25; Jason Bast (4) - pp - 11:33
13:07 - TJ Galiardi (2)		Second period	No scoring
19:10 - Ian Duval (1)		Third period	Joel Broda (1) - pp - 14:20; Jason Bast (5) - en - 19:48
Daniel Spence (20 saves / 23 shots)		Goalie stats	Joey Perricone (44 saves / 46 shots)

March 30	Moose Jaw Warriors	2 – 4	Calgary Hitmen	Moose Jaw Civic Centre
No scoring		First period	No scoring
5:32 - Riley Holzapfel (3)		Second period	Brett Sonne (1) - 1:26; Brandon Kozun (4) - 11:35
9:46 - pp - Jordan Knackstedt (1)		Third period	Ryan White (2) - 8:51; Kyle Bortis (4) - sh - en - 18:14
Joey Perricone (23 saves / 26 shots)		Goalie stats	Daniel Spence (16 saves / 18 shots)

Calgary wins series 4 – 2

==== (E2) Regina Pats vs. (E7) Swift Current Broncos ====
March 21	Regina Pats	2 – 1	Swift Current Broncos	Brandt Centre

March 22	Regina Pats	3 – 5	Swift Current Broncos	Brandt Centre

March 25	Swift Current Broncos	3 – 4	OT	Regina Pats	InnovationPlex

March 26	Swift Current Broncos	5 – 4	2OT	Regina Pats	InnovationPlex

March 28	Regina Pats	3 – 6	Swift Current Broncos	Brandt Centre

March 29	Swift Current Broncos	5 – 2	Regina Pats	InnovationPlex

Swift Current wins series 4 – 2

==== (E3) Lethbridge Hurricanes vs. (E6) Brandon Wheat Kings ====
March 21	Lethbridge Hurricanes	2 – 1	Brandon Wheat Kings	ENMAX Centre
No scoring		First period	No scoring
No scoring		Second period	No scoring
12:59 - pp - Dwight King (1); 13:57 - pp - Zach Boychuk (1)		Third period	Tyler Dittmer (1) - 3:12
Juha Metsola (27 saves / 28 shots)		Goalie stats	Joe Caligiuri (22 saves / 24 shots)

March 22	Lethbridge Hurricanes	4 – 3	Brandon Wheat Kings	ENMAX Centre
2:15 - pp - Nicholas Hotson (1); 10:33 - pp - Luca Sbisa (1)		First period	Matt Lowry (1) - sh - 1:21; Scott Glennie (1) - 12:34
7:53 - pp - Zach Boychuk (2); 14:26 - sh - Mike Wuchterl (1)		Second period	No scoring
No scoring		Third period	Daryl Boyle (1) - pp - 5:45
Juha Metsola (24 saves / 27 shots)		Goalie stats	Joe Caligiuri (22 saves / 26 shots)

March 25	Brandon Wheat Kings	3 – 4	Lethbridge Hurricanes	Westman Place

March 26	Brandon Wheat Kings	5 – 1	Lethbridge Hurricanes	Westman Place

March 28	Brandon Wheat Kings	4 – 3	Lethbridge Hurricanes	Westman Place

March 30	Lethbridge Hurricanes	4 – 0	Brandon Wheat Kings	ENMAX Centre

Lethbridge wins series 4 – 2

==== (E4) Medicine Hat Tigers vs. (E5) Kootenay Ice ====
March 21	Medicine Hat Tigers	2 – 5	Kootenay Ice	Medicine Hat Arena

March 22	Medicine Hat Tigers	3 – 4	OT	Kootenay Ice	Medicine Hat Arena

March 25	Kootenay Ice	2 – 1	Medicine Hat Tigers	Cranbrook Recreational Complex

March 26	Kootenay Ice	3 – 5	Medicine Hat Tigers	Cranbrook Recreational Complex

March 28	Medicine Hat Tigers	1 – 3	Kootenay Ice	Medicine Hat Arena

Kootenay wins series 4 – 1

==== (W1) Tri-City Americans vs. (W8) Kamloops Blazers ====
March 21	Tri-City Americans	6 – 1	Kamloops Blazers	Toyota Center

March 22	Tri-City Americans	4 – 1	Kamloops Blazers	Toyota Center

March 25	Tri-City Americans	3 – 4	Kamloops Blazers	Toyota Center

March 26	Kamloops Blazers	2 – 6	Tri-City Americans	Interior Savings Centre

Tri-City wins series 4 – 0

==== (W4) Seattle Thunderbirds vs. (W5) Kelowna Rockets ====
March 21	Seattle Thunderbirds	2 – 3	Kelowna Rockets	Key Arena

March 22	Seattle Thunderbirds	1 – 3	Kelowna Rockets	Key Arena

March 24	Kelowna Rockets	2 – 3	OT	Seattle Thunderbirds	Prospera Place

March 25	Kelowna Rockets	4 – 6	Seattle Thunderbirds	Prospera Place

March 27	Seattle Thunderbirds	6 – 2	Kelowna Rockets	Key Arena

March 29	Kelowna Rockets	4 – 3	OT	Seattle Thunderbirds	Prospera Place

April 1	Seattle Thunderbirds	4 – 2	Kelowna Rockets	Key Arena

Seattle wins series 4 – 3

==== (W2) Vancouver Giants vs. (W7) Chilliwack Bruins ====
March 21	Vancouver Giants	2 – 1	Chilliwack Bruins	Pacific Coliseum

March 22	Vancouver Giants	3 – 2	Chilliwack Bruins	Pacific Coliseum

March 25	Chilliwack Bruins	3 – 4	3OT	Vancouver Giants	Prospera Centre

March 26	Chilliwack Bruins	1 – 2	Vancouver Giants	Prospera Centre

Vancouver wins series 4 – 0

==== (W3) Spokane Chiefs vs. (W6) Everett Silvertips ====
March 21	Spokane Chiefs	5 – 2	Everett Silvertips	Numerica Veterans Arena
12:03 - pp - Drayson Bowman (1); 12:52 - pp - David Rutherford (1); 17:21 - pp - Judd Blackwater (1)		First period	No scoring
3:37 - Chris Bruton (1)		Second period	Matthew Ius (1) - 0:12
11:42 - pp - Drayson Bowman (2)		Third period	Jonathan Harty (1) - pp - 5:19
Dustin Tokarski (24 saves / 25 shots)		Goalie stats	Leland Irving (15 saves / 19 shots); Shayne Barrie (24 saves / 25 shots)

March 22	Spokane Chiefs	4 – 1	Everett Silvertips	Numerica Veterans Arena
15:57 - pp - Ondřej Roman (1)		First period	No scoring
10:37 - Seth Compton (1)		Second period	No scoring
2:18 - Ondřej Roman (2); 18:06 - en - Mitch Wahl (1)		Third period	Clayton Bauer (1) - 14:36
Dustin Tokarski (20 saves / 21 shots)		Goalie stats	Leland Irving (41 saves / 44 shots)

March 26	Everett Silvertips	1 – 4	Spokane Chiefs	Xfinity Arena
No scoring		First period	Levko Koper (1) - sh - 7:15
13:49 - Dan Gendur (1)		Second period	Ondřej Roman (3) - 2:09
No scoring		Third period	Drayson Bowman (3) - 15:20; Judd Blackwater (2) - en - 16:38
Leland Irving (19 saves / 22 shots)		Goalie stats	Dustin Tokarski (28 saves / 29 shots)

March 28	Everett Silvertips	2 – 3	OT	Spokane Chiefs	Xfinity Arena
No scoring		First period		Judd Blackwater (3) - 18:56
No scoring		Second period		No scoring
12:20 - Graham Potuer (1); 19:05 - pp - Jonathan Harty (2)		Third period		Levko Koper (2) - 11:06
No scoring		First overtime period		Mitch Wahl (2) - 12:21
Shayne Barrie (32 saves / 35 shots)		Goalie stats		Dustin Tokarski (33 saves / 35 shots)

Spokane wins series 4 – 0

=== Conference semi-finals ===
==== (E1) Calgary Hitmen vs. (E7) Swift Current Broncos ====
April 4	Swift Current Broncos	3 – 2	Calgary Hitmen	InnovationPlex
No scoring		First period	2:55 - Karl Alzner (3); 7:01 - pp - Karl Alzner (4)
Levi Nelson (4) - pp - 3:31; Cody Eakin (2) - 15:09		Second period	No scoring
Levi Nelson (5) - 8:37		Third period	No scoring
Travis Yonkman (22 saves / 24 shots)		Goalie stats	Daniel Spence (28 saves / 31 shots)

April 5	Swift Current Broncos	2 – 5	Calgary Hitmen	InnovationPlex
No scoring		First period	9:30 - TJ Galiardi (3); 15:09 - Paul Postma (3)
Zack Smith (4) - pp - 6:18		Second period	4:09 - Brock Nixon (4)
Levi Nelson (6) - 14:10		Third period	4:29 - Kyle Bortis (5); 19:07 - en - TJ Galiardi (4)
Travis Yonkman (29 saves / 33 shots)		Goalie stats	Daniel Spence (38 saves / 40 shots)

April 8	Calgary Hitmen	6 – 5	OT	Swift Current Broncos	Scotiabank Saddledome
Paul Postma (4) - 17:04		First period		0:57 - Dale Weise (4); 6:21 - Matt Tassone (2)
Brock Nixon (5) - pp - 7:50; Karl Alzner (5) - pp - 19:28		Second period		9:17 - pp - Matt Tassone (3); 11:20 - pp - Michael Wilson (1); 12:08 - Geordie Wudrick (5)
Brock Nixon (6) - 2:14; Ian Schultz (2) - 9:11		Third period		No scoring
Ryan White (3) - 19:07		First overtime period		No scoring
Daniel Spence (12 saves / 16 shots); Martin Jones (20 saves / 21 shots)		Goalie stats		Travis Yonkman (56 saves / 62 shots)

April 9	Calgary Hitmen	3 – 2	Swift Current Broncos	Scotiabank Saddledome
Paul Postma (5) - pp - 19:26		First period	No scoring
Paul Postma (6) - pp - 6:04; Brett Sonne (2) - 17:15		Second period	13:54 - Dale Weise (5)
No scoring		Third period	10:13 - David Stieler (2)
Daniel Spence (18 saves / 20 shots)		Goalie stats	Travis Yonkman (31 saves / 34 shots)

April 11	Calgary Hitmen	2 – 5	Swift Current Broncos	Scotiabank Saddledome
0:23 - Ryan White (4); 2:19 - pp - Michael Stone (1)		First period	Jesse Dudas (1) - 4:30; Dale Weise (6) - pp - 12:21; Keegan Dansereau (4) - 17:16; Levi Nelson (7) - 17:35
No scoring		Second period	No scoring
No scoring		Third period	Dale Weise (7) - sh - en - 19:27
Daniel Spence (8 saves / 12 shots); Martin Jones (14 saves / 14 shots)		Goalie stats	Travis Yonkman (21 saves / 23 shots)

April 12	Swift Current Broncos	4 – 8	Calgary Hitmen	InnovationPlex
2:47 - Keegan Dansereau (5); 16:00 - Cody Eakin (3)		First period	Brock Nixon (7) - 3:41; TJ Galiardi (5) - 4:00; Brock Nixon (8) - 9:45; Karl Alzner (6) - 19:37
No scoring		Second period	Kyle Bortis (6) - pp - 15:05
1:24 - Zack Smith (5); 10:18 - Jan Dalecký (1)		Third period	Ryan White (5) - pp - 14:26; Ryan White (6) - en - 18:03; Brock Nixon (9) - pp - en - 19:31
Travis Yonkman (30 saves / 36 shots)		Goalie stats	Martin Jones (27 saves / 31 shots)

Calgary wins series 4 – 2

==== (E3) Lethbridge Hurricanes vs. (E5) Kootenay Ice ====
April 4	Lethbridge Hurricanes	2 – 3	Kootenay Ice	ENMAX Centre

April 5	Lethbridge Hurricanes	5 – 4	OT	Kootenay Ice	ENMAX Centre

April 8	Kootenay Ice	2 – 5	Lethbridge Hurricanes	Cranbrook Recreational Complex

April 9	Kootenay Ice	1 – 2	2OT	Lethbridge Hurricanes	Cranbrook Recreational Complex

April 11	Lethbridge Hurricanes	3 – 0	Kootenay Ice	ENMAX Centre

Lethbridge wins series 4 – 1

==== (W1) Tri-City Americans vs. (W4) Seattle Thunderbirds ====
April 4	Tri-City Americans	1 – 7	Seattle Thunderbirds	Toyota Center

April 5	Tri-City Americans	5 – 0	Seattle Thunderbirds	Toyota Center

April 8	Seattle Thunderbirds	2 – 3	Tri-City Americans	Key Arena

April 9	Seattle Thunderbirds	2 – 3	OT	Tri-City Americans	Key Arena

April 11	Tri-City Americans	4 – 0	Seattle Thunderbirds	Toyota Center

Tri-City wins series 4 – 1

==== (W2) Vancouver Giants vs. (W3) Spokane Chiefs ====
April 4	Spokane Chiefs	1 – 4	Vancouver Giants	Numerica Veterans Arena

April 6	Spokane Chiefs	4 – 1	Vancouver Giants	Numerica Veterans Arena

April 9	Vancouver Giants	2 – 3	Spokane Chiefs	Pacific Coliseum

April 11	Vancouver Giants	3 – 1	Spokane Chiefs	Pacific Coliseum

April 12	Vancouver Giants	0 – 4	Spokane Chiefs	Pacific Coliseum

April 14	Spokane Chiefs	3 – 1	Vancouver Giants	Numerica Veterans Arena

Spokane wins series 4 – 2

=== Conference finals ===
==== (E1) Calgary Hitmen vs. (E3) Lethbridge Hurricanes ====
April 17	Calgary Hitmen	2 – 5	Lethbridge Hurricanes	Scotiabank Saddledome
No scoring		First period	Zach Boychuk (8) - pp - 6:47; Ben Wright (1) - 14:31
12:08 - Carson McMillan (1)		Second period	No scoring
7:49 - pp - Michael Stone (2)		Third period	Dwight King (7) - pp - 0:29; Colton Sceviour (3) - 14:19; Zach Boychuk (9) - en - 19:32
Martin Jones (15 saves / 19 shots)		Goalie stats	Juha Metsola (17 saves / 19 shots)

April 18	Calgary Hitmen	3 – 4	OT	Lethbridge Hurricanes	Scotiabank Saddledome
6:13 - Boštjan Goličič (1)		First period		No scoring
8:01 - Brett Sonne (3); 14:54 - pp - Kyle Bortis (7)		Second period		Zach Boychuk (10) - 6:03; Zach Boychuk (11) - 15:25
No scoring		Third period		Adam Chorneyko (1) - 16:02
No scoring		First overtime period		Austin Fyten (1) - 2:37
Daniel Spence (33 saves / 37 shots)		Goalie stats		Juha Metsola (24 saves / 27 shots)

April 22	Lethbridge Hurricanes	6 – 0	Calgary Hitmen	ENMAX Centre
No scoring		First period	No scoring
0:28 - Carter Bancks (3); 14:04 - Carter Bancks (4); 15:53 - Adam Chorneyko (2)		Second period	No scoring
1:46 - Mitch Fadden (5); 7:27 - Craig Orfino (3); 12:54 - pp - Jeff May (2)		Third period	No scoring
Juha Metsola (25 saves / 25 shots)		Goalie stats	Daniel Spence (13 saves / 16 shots); Martin Jones (11 saves / 14 shots)

April 23	Lethbridge Hurricanes	4 – 2	Calgary Hitmen	ENMAX Centre
No scoring		First period	No scoring
0:09 - Carter Bancks (5); 14:42 - Craig Orfino (4); 19:49 - Daniel Iwanski (2)		Second period	Michael Stone (3) - pp - 6:47
19:46 - en - Carter Bancks (6)		Third period	Kyle Bortis (8) - pp - 9:19
Juha Metsola (23 saves / 25 shots)		Goalie stats	Daniel Spence (23 saves / 26 shots)

Spokane wins series 4 – 0

==== (W1) Tri-City Americans vs. (W3) Spokane Chiefs ====
April 18	Tri-City Americans	0 – 1	2OT	Spokane Chiefs	Toyota Center
No scoring		First period		No scoring
No scoring		Second period		No scoring
No scoring		Third period		No scoring
No scoring		Second overtime period		Ondřej Roman (6) - 0:49
Chet Pickard (36 saves / 37 shots)		Goalie stats		Dustin Tokarski (24 saves / 24 shots)

April 20	Tri-City Americans	1 – 0	2OT	Spokane Chiefs	Toyota Center
No scoring		First period		No scoring
No scoring		Second period		No scoring
No scoring		Third period		No scoring
4:17 - Drew Hoff (2)		Second overtime period		No scoring
Chet Pickard (45 saves / 45 shots)		Goalie stats		Dustin Tokarski (33 saves / 34 shots)

April 21	Spokane Chiefs	2 – 0	Tri-City Americans	Numerica Veterans Arena
8:21 - Ondřej Roman (7)		First period	No scoring
No scoring		Second period	No scoring
8:59 - David Rutherford (6)		Third period	No scoring
Dustin Tokarski (25 saves / 25 shots)		Goalie stats	Chet Pickard (34 saves / 36 shots)

April 22	Spokane Chiefs	2 – 3	OT	Tri-City Americans	Numerica Veterans Arena
4:29 - Mitch Wahl (4)		First period		Colton Yellow Horn (9) - pp - 19:20; Jarrett Toll (1) - 19:39
18:49 - pp - Drayson Bowman (5)		Second period		No scoring
No scoring		Third period		No scoring
No scoring		First overtime period		Kruise Reddick (2) - sh - 2:07
Dustin Tokarski (30 saves / 33 shots)		Goalie stats		Chet Pickard (18 saves / 20 shots)

April 26	Tri-City Americans	3 – 4	2OT	Spokane Chiefs	Toyota Center

April 28	Spokane Chiefs	1 – 2	OT	Tri-City Americans	Numerica Veterans Arena

April 29	Tri-City Americans	1 – 4	Spokane Chiefs	Toyota Center

Spokane wins series 4 – 3

=== WHL Championship ===
==== (W3) Spokane Chiefs vs. (E3) Lethbridge Hurricanes ====
May 2	Spokane Chiefs	4 – 1	Lethbridge Hurricanes	Numerica Veterans Arena

May 3	Spokane Chiefs	5 – 2	Lethbridge Hurricanes	Numerica Veterans Arena

May 6	Lethbridge Hurricanes	1 – 2	OT	Spokane Chiefs	ENMAX Centre

May 7	Lethbridge Hurricanes	1 – 4	Spokane Chiefs	ENMAX Centre

Spokane wins series 4 – 0

== Memorial Cup ==
The 90th Memorial Cup was held in Kitchener, Ontario.

== WHL awards ==
Four Broncos Memorial Trophy	Player of the Year	Karl Alzner	Calgary Hitmen
Daryl K. (Doc) Seaman Trophy	Scholastic Player of the Year	Jordan Eberle	Regina Pats
Jim Donlevy Memorial Trophy	Scholastic team of the Year	Chilliwack Bruins	
Bob Clarke Trophy	Top Scorer	Mark Santorelli	Chilliwack Bruins
Brad Hornung Trophy	Most Sportsmanlike Player	Tyler Ennis	Medicine Hat Tigers
Bill Hunter Trophy	Top Defenseman	Karl Alzner	Calgary Hitmen
Jim Piggott Memorial Trophy	Rookie of the Year	Brayden Schenn	Brandon Wheat Kings
Del Wilson Trophy	Top Goaltender	Chet Pickard	Tri-City Americans
Dunc McCallum Memorial Trophy	Coach of the Year	Don Nachbaur	Tri-City Americans
Lloyd Saunders Memorial Trophy	Executive of the Year	Bob Tory	Tri-City Americans
Scotty Munro Memorial Trophy	Regular season champions	Tri-City Americans	
Allen Paradice Memorial Trophy	Top Official	Andy Thiessen	
St. Clair Group Trophy	Marketing/Public Relations Award	Kip Reghenas	Calgary Hitmen
Doug Wickenheiser Memorial Trophy	Humanitarian of the Year	Ashton Hewson	Prince Albert Raiders
WHL Plus-Minus Award		Greg Scott	Seattle Thunderbirds
WHL Playoff MVP	WHL Finals Most Valuable Player	Tyler Johnson	Spokane Chiefs
Professional Hockey Achievement; Academic Recipient	Alumni Achievement Awards	Lanny McDonald; Blair St. Martin	

== All-Star teams ==
Eastern Conference
	First Team		Second Team	
Goal	Linden Rowat	Regina Pats	Dan Spence	Calgary Hitmen
Defense	Karl Alzner	Calgary Hitmen	Ty Wishart	Moose Jaw Warriors
Defense	Logan Pyett	Regina Pats	Daryl Boyle	Brandon Wheat Kings
Forward	Steve DaSilva	Kootenay Ice	Mitch Fadden	Lethbridge Hurricanes
Forward	Tyler Ennis	Medicine Hat Tigers	Zach Boychuk	Lethbridge Hurricanes
Forward	Jordan Eberle	Regina Pats	Ryan White	Calgary Hitmen
Western Conference
	First Team		Second Team	
Goal	Chet Pickard	Tri-City Americans	Tyson Sexsmith	Vancouver Giants
Defense	T.J. Fast	Tri-City Americans	Jonathon Blum	Vancouver Giants
Defense	Thomas Hickey	Seattle Thunderbirds	Luke Schenn	Kelowna Rockets
Forward	Colton Yellow Horn	Tri-City Americans	Dan Gendur	Everett Silvertips
Forward	Colin Long	Kelowna Rockets	Mark Santorelli	Chilliwack Bruins
Forward	Oscar Moller	Chilliwack Bruins	Drayson Bowman	Spokane Chiefs

- source: Western Hockey League press release

== 2008 Bantam Draft ==
First round

#	Player	Nationality	WHL Team
1	Ryan Nugent-Hopkins (C)	Canada	Red Deer Rebels
2	Ty Rattie (LW)	Canada	Portland Winter Hawks
3	Duncan Siemens (D)	Canada	Saskatoon Blades (from Prince George)
4	Michael St. Croix (C)	Canada	Edmonton Oil Kings
5	Mark McNeill (C)	Canada	Prince Albert Raiders
6	Brent Benson (C)	Canada	Saskatoon Blades
7	Colin Smith (C)	Canada	Kamloops Blazers
8	Mitch Topping (D)	Canada	Chilliwack Bruins
9	Ryan Murray (D)	Canada	Everett Silvertips
10	Klarc Wilson (RW)	Canada	Brandon Wheat Kings
11	Jesse Forsberg (D)	Canada	Moose Jaw Warriors (from Prince George)
12	Reece Scarlett (D)	Canada	Swift Current Broncos
13	Shane McColgan (C)	United States	Kelowna Rockets
14	Connor Sanvido (C)	Canada	Seattle Thunderbirds
15	Brendan Hurley (LW)	Canada	Kootenay Ice
16	Dylan Busenius (D)	Canada	Medicine Hat Tigers
17	Myles Bell (D)	Canada	Regina Pats
18	Phil Tot (C)	Canada	Lethbridge Hurricanes
19	Peter Kosterman (D)	Canada	Calgary Hitmen
20	Zach Hodder (D)	Canada	Vancouver Giants
21	Mitch Holmberg (RW)	Canada	Spokane Chiefs
22	Zac Yuen (D)	Canada	Tri-City Americans

== See also ==
- 2007–08 OHL season
- 2007–08 QMJHL season
- 2008 NHL entry draft
- 2007 in ice hockey
- 2008 in ice hockey

== Notes ==
Preceded by 2006–07 WHL season	WHL seasons	Succeeded by 2008–09 WHL season
