= Paul Postma =

Canadian ice hockey player (born 1989)

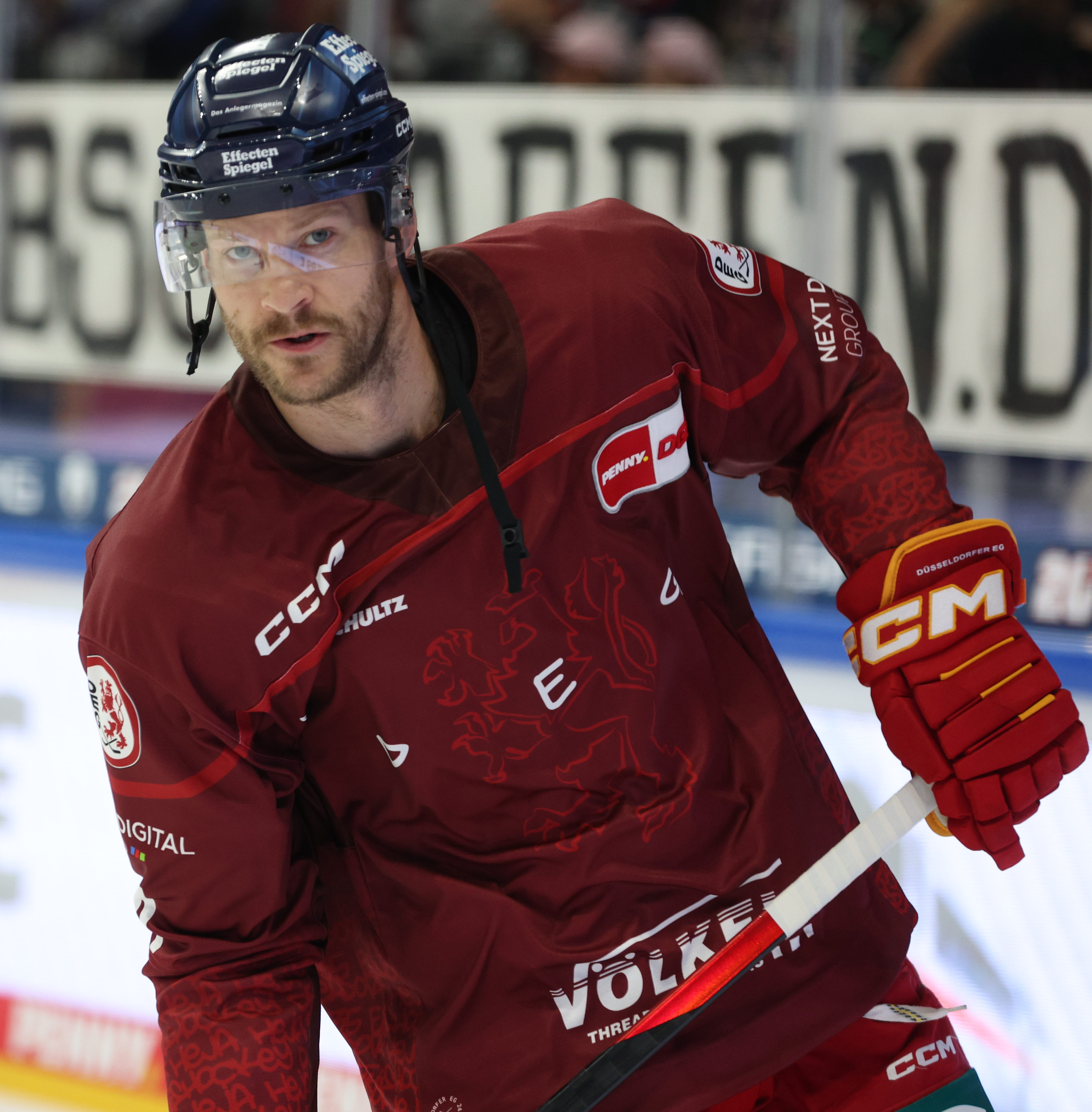
- Postma with Düsseldorfer EG in October 2024
- Born: February 22, 1989 (age 37) Red Deer, Alberta, Canada
- Height: 6 ft 3 in (191 cm)
- Weight: 195 lb (88 kg; 13 st 13 lb)
- Position: Defence
- Shoots: Right
- team Former teams: Free agent Atlanta Thrashers; Winnipeg Jets; Boston Bruins; Ak Bars Kazan; Metallurg Magnitogorsk; HC Lugano; EC KAC; Düsseldorfer EG
- NHL draft: 205th overall, 2007; Atlanta Thrashers
- Playing career: 2009–present

Paul Edward Postma (born February 22, 1989) is a Canadian professional ice hockey defenceman who is currently a free agent. He last played for Düsseldorfer EG of the Deutsche Eishockey Liga (DEL). He was drafted 205th overall in the 2007 NHL entry draft by the Atlanta Thrashers. During his major junior career with the Swift Current Broncos and Calgary Hitmen of the Western Hockey League (WHL), Postma won the WHL Plus-Minus Award and was a WHL East First Team All-Star in 2009.

== Playing career ==
Postma has played major junior in the WHL for the Swift Current Broncos and Calgary Hitmen. After a 24-point season in 2006–07, he was drafted in the 7th round, 205th overall, by the Atlanta Thrashers in the 2007 NHL entry draft. The next season, he was traded to the Calgary Hitmen, where he recorded 14 goals and 42 points. In 2008–09, Postma emerged with a 23-goal, 84-point campaign, first among league defencemen, setting team records for single-season goals (surpassed Kenton Smith's 19 goals in 1998–99) and points (tied with Matt Kinch) by a defenceman.

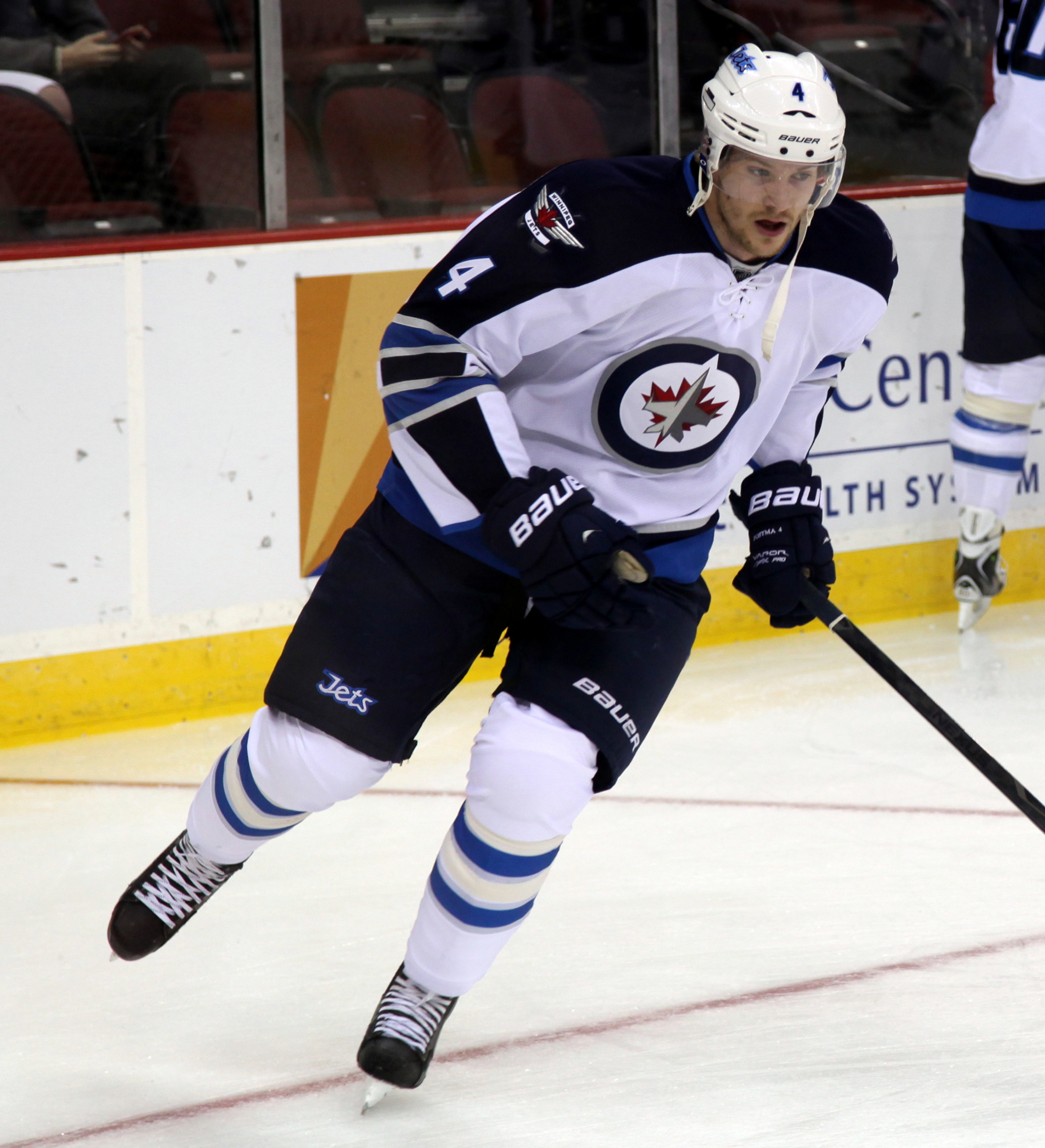
Postma with the Winnipeg Jets in 2013.

He earned WHL East First Team All-Star honours, along with teammates Brandon Kozun and Brett Sonne and a nomination for the Bill Hunter Memorial Trophy as the league's top defenceman, opposite Jonathon Blum of the Vancouver Giants. With a league-high +67 plus-minus rating, he won the WHL Plus-Minus Award. During the second round of the subsequent 2009 playoffs, Postma was signed to a three-year, entry-level contract by the Thrashers. He finished the 2009 playoffs with 13 points in 18 games, as the Hitmen were defeated in the finals by the Kelowna Rockets.

While playing for the Winnipeg Jets, Postma scored his first NHL goal on February 1, 2013, against Anders Lindbäck of the Tampa Bay Lightning. In 2013–14, Postma missed most of the season due to injury, including a blood clot that had him sidelined for 47 games. Postma played a total of 42 games for the Jets during the 2014–15 season, but was sidelined in March, due to a lower-body injury.

On July 10, 2015, Postma signed a two-year, $1,775,000 contract extension with the Jets.

After spending his first eight professional seasons with the Thrashers/Jets franchise, Postma left as a free agent in agreeing to terms with the Boston Bruins on a one-year, $775,000 contract on July 1, 2017. He split the 2017–18 season between Boston and AHL affiliate, the Providence Bruins.

As a free agent from the Bruins, Postma opted to halt his North American career, agreeing to a one-year contract with Russian champions, Ak Bars Kazan of the Kontinental Hockey League (KHL), on August 15, 2018. In the 2018–19 season, Postma regained his scoring touch in the KHL, posting 8 goals and 28 points through 57 regular season games.

On May 1, 2019, Postma left Ak Bars as a free agent to sign a one-year contract with Russian outfit, Metallurg Magnitogorsk. He made just 10 appearances with Magnitogorsk to open the 2019–20 season before opting to leave the KHL on October 6, 2019. Moving to continue his career in Switzerland, after a successful tryout, Postma joined HC Lugano of the National League (NL) on a one-year deal on November 6, 2019.

On December 8, 2020, Postma belatedly joined Austrian club, EC KAC of the ICEHL, as a free agent on an initial one-year contract.

== Personal life ==
Postma attended Gateway Christian School and Notre Dame High School in Red Deer, Alberta. He is the son of John and Janet Postma and has three sisters, Alissa, Jamie-Lea and Sharlene. Alissa is married to former NHL defenceman Noah Welch, and Sharlene is married to former NHL forward Rhett Rakhshani.

Paul married Brooke Sutter, daughter of Brent Sutter, during the summer of 2023.

== Records ==
- Calgary Hitmen team record; single-season points by a defenceman - 84 in 2008–09 (tied with Matt Kinch - 2000–01)

== Career statistics ==
			Regular season					Playoffs
Season	Team	League	GP	G	A	Pts	PIM	GP	G	A	Pts	PIM
2004–05	Swift Current Broncos	WHL	4	0	0	0	0	—	—	—	—	—
2005–06	Swift Current Broncos	WHL	58	2	9	11	6	4	0	0	0	0
2006–07	Swift Current Broncos	WHL	70	5	19	24	42	6	0	1	1	0
2007–08	Swift Current Broncos	WHL	2	0	0	0	2	—	—	—	—	—
2007–08	Calgary Hitmen	WHL	66	14	28	42	30	16	6	4	10	4
2008–09	Calgary Hitmen	WHL	70	23	61	84	28	18	5	8	13	10
2009–10	Chicago Wolves	AHL	63	15	14	29	24	7	0	2	2	0
2010–11	Chicago Wolves	AHL	69	12	33	45	20	—	—	—	—	—
2010–11	Atlanta Thrashers	NHL	1	0	0	0	0	—	—	—	—	—
2011–12	St. John's IceCaps	AHL	56	13	31	44	32	15	1	9	10	14
2011–12	Winnipeg Jets	NHL	3	0	0	0	0	—	—	—	—	—
2012–13	St. John's IceCaps	AHL	27	7	11	18	16	—	—	—	—	—
2012–13	Winnipeg Jets	NHL	34	4	5	9	6	—	—	—	—	—
2013–14	Winnipeg Jets	NHL	20	1	2	3	8	—	—	—	—	—
2013–14	St. John's IceCaps	AHL	4	1	5	6	4	—	—	—	—	—
2014–15	Winnipeg Jets	NHL	42	2	4	6	16	—	—	—	—	—
2015–16	Winnipeg Jets	NHL	26	2	0	2	4	—	—	—	—	—
2015–16	Manitoba Moose	AHL	7	1	2	3	2	—	—	—	—	—
2016–17	Winnipeg Jets	NHL	65	1	13	14	15	—	—	—	—	—
2017–18	Boston Bruins	NHL	14	0	1	1	2	—	—	—	—	—
2017–18	Providence Bruins	AHL	13	1	8	9	4	4	0	3	3	0
2018–19	Ak Bars Kazan	KHL	57	8	20	28	12	4	2	1	3	0
2019–20	Metallurg Magnitogorsk	KHL	10	0	2	2	2	—	—	—	—	—
2019–20	HC Lugano	NL	20	2	7	9	6	—	—	—	—	—
2020–21	EC KAC	ICEHL	20	8	14	22	2	—	—	—	—	—
2021–22	EC KAC	ICEHL	35	12	17	29	26	9	3	8	11	6
2022–23	EC KAC	ICEHL	45	10	20	30	27	9	1	2	3	0
2023–24	EC KAC	ICEHL	44	9	28	37	18	16	3	5	8	4
2024–25	Düsseldorfer EG	DEL	39	8	13	21	20	—	—	—	—	—
AHL totals			239	50	104	154	102	26	1	14	15	14
NHL totals			205	10	25	35	49	—	—	—	—	—

== Awards and honours ==
Award	Year
WHL
East First All-Star Team	2009
WHL Plus-Minus Award	2009
CHL Second All-Star Team	2009
AHL
All-Star Game	2011, 2012
First All-Star Team	2012
