= Karl Alzner =

Canadian ice hockey player (born 1988)

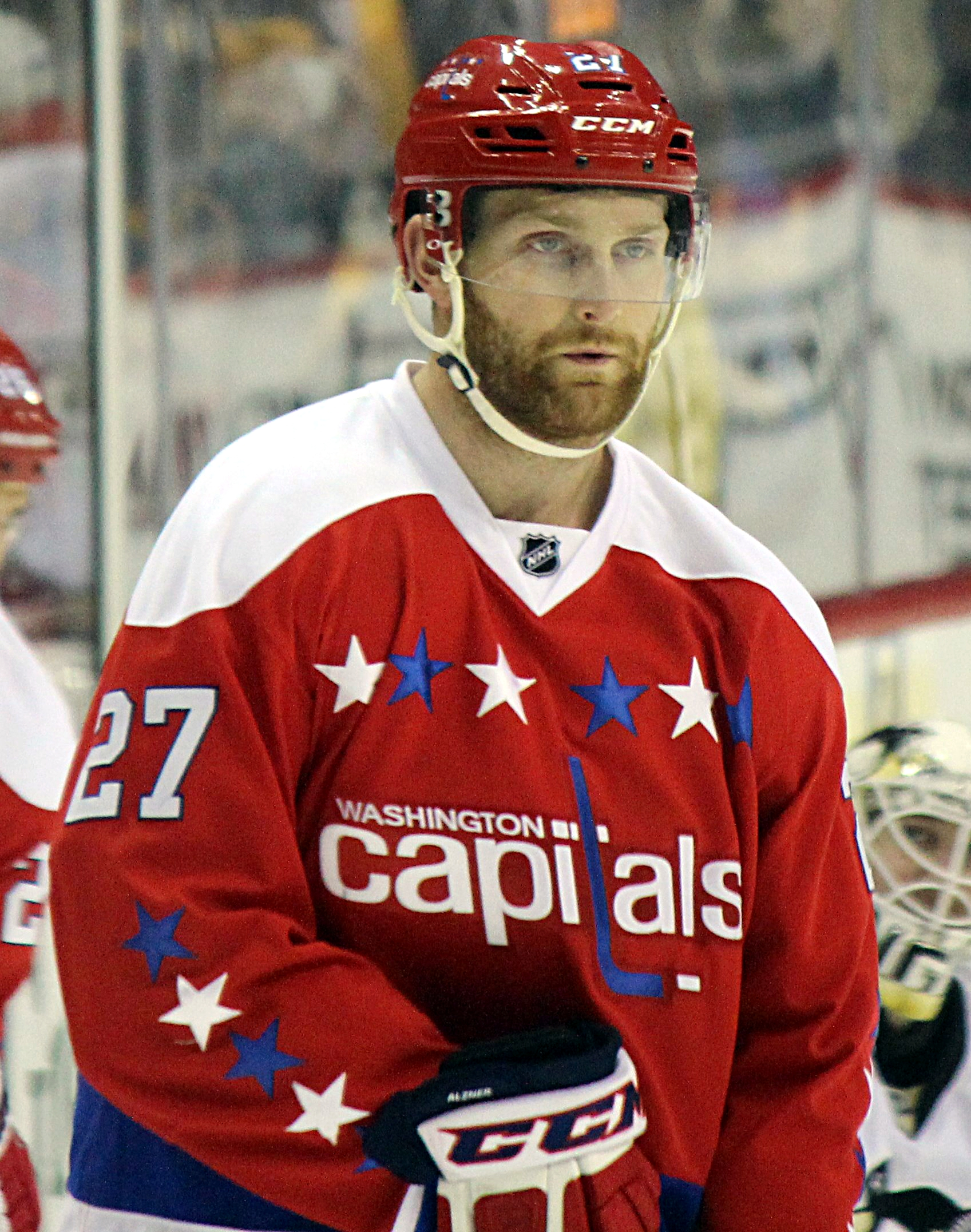
- Alzner with the Washington Capitals in April 2016
- Born: September 24, 1988 (age 37) Burnaby, British Columbia, Canada
- Height: 6 ft 3 in (191 cm)
- Weight: 219 lb (99 kg; 15 st 9 lb)
- Position: Defence
- Shot: Left
- Played for: Washington Capitals; Montreal Canadiens
- NHL draft: 5th overall, 2007; Washington Capitals
- Playing career: 2008–2020

Karl Alexander Alzner (born September 24, 1988) is a Canadian former professional ice hockey defenceman. He was selected in the first round, fifth overall, by the Washington Capitals of the National Hockey League (NHL) in the 2007 NHL entry draft, and has also played for the Montreal Canadiens.

After a junior career with the Calgary Hitmen, Alzner won two World Junior Hockey Championship gold medals with Team Canada 2007 and 2008 (as the captain). Alzner was named the Western Hockey League (WHL)'s top player and Canadian Hockey League (CHL)'s top defenceman in 2008. He won back to back Calder Cups and won the Presidents' Trophy in 2016 and 2017 with the Capitals.

== Playing career ==
=== Junior and Canadian appearance ===
As a youth, Alzner played in the 2002 Quebec International Pee-Wee Hockey Tournament with a minor ice hockey team from Burnaby. He later played Junior B as a 14/15 year old for the Richmond Sockeyes in 2003–04, and won the PIJHL league championship, the Cyclone Taylor Cup provincial championship and placed 2nd in the Keystone Cup.

Alzner played four Western Hockey League (WHL) seasons with the Calgary Hitmen as part of a standout junior career. His last year he was captain. Alzner was on Team Pacific Silver against Team Toews (West) Gold. He was a Canada national team member winning in 2005 Memorial of Ivan Hlinka and Canada's gold medal-winning team at the 2007 World Junior Hockey Championships as one of only two players who had not been selected in the NHL draft (the other being Sam Gagner). Shortly after returning to Calgary after the World Junior Championships, Alzner headed to Quebec City, Quebec to play in the 2007 Top Prospects Game and Alzner was named Captain of Team White and Sam Gagner was Captain of team Red.

Alzner was an assistant captain in the 2007 Super Series against the Russian junior team, and was named captain of Team Canada for the 2008 World Junior Championships, both of which were won by Canada. Alzner was named the WHL Player of the Year and Defenceman of the Year for the 2007–08 WHL season. He was also named the top defenceman in the Canadian Hockey League.

In 2013, Alzner was invited to tryout for the Canadian men's national team.

=== Professional (2008–2020) ===
==== Washington Capitals (2008–2017) ====
Alzner was assigned to the Hershey Bears of the American Hockey League (AHL) to start 2008–09. He was called up to the Washington Capitals roster on November 26, 2008, making his NHL debut that night against the Atlanta Thrashers. He recorded his first NHL point (an assist) on December 4, 2008, against the New York Islanders. He recorded his first goal the next game on December 6, 2008, on Hockey Night in Canada against Vesa Toskala of the Toronto Maple Leafs. Alzner's reactions to this accomplishment were captured in an audio-journal he was keeping for the Hockey Diaries project. Alzner was sent back down to Hershey on January 28, 2009 to make room for returning defenceman Tom Poti. He was recalled during the Capitals' playoff series with the Pittsburgh Penguins on May 3 as a precautionary measure after injuries to several Washington defencemen, but did not see any action. Alzner won his first Calder Cup Championship 2008–09 with the Hershey Bears against Manitoba.

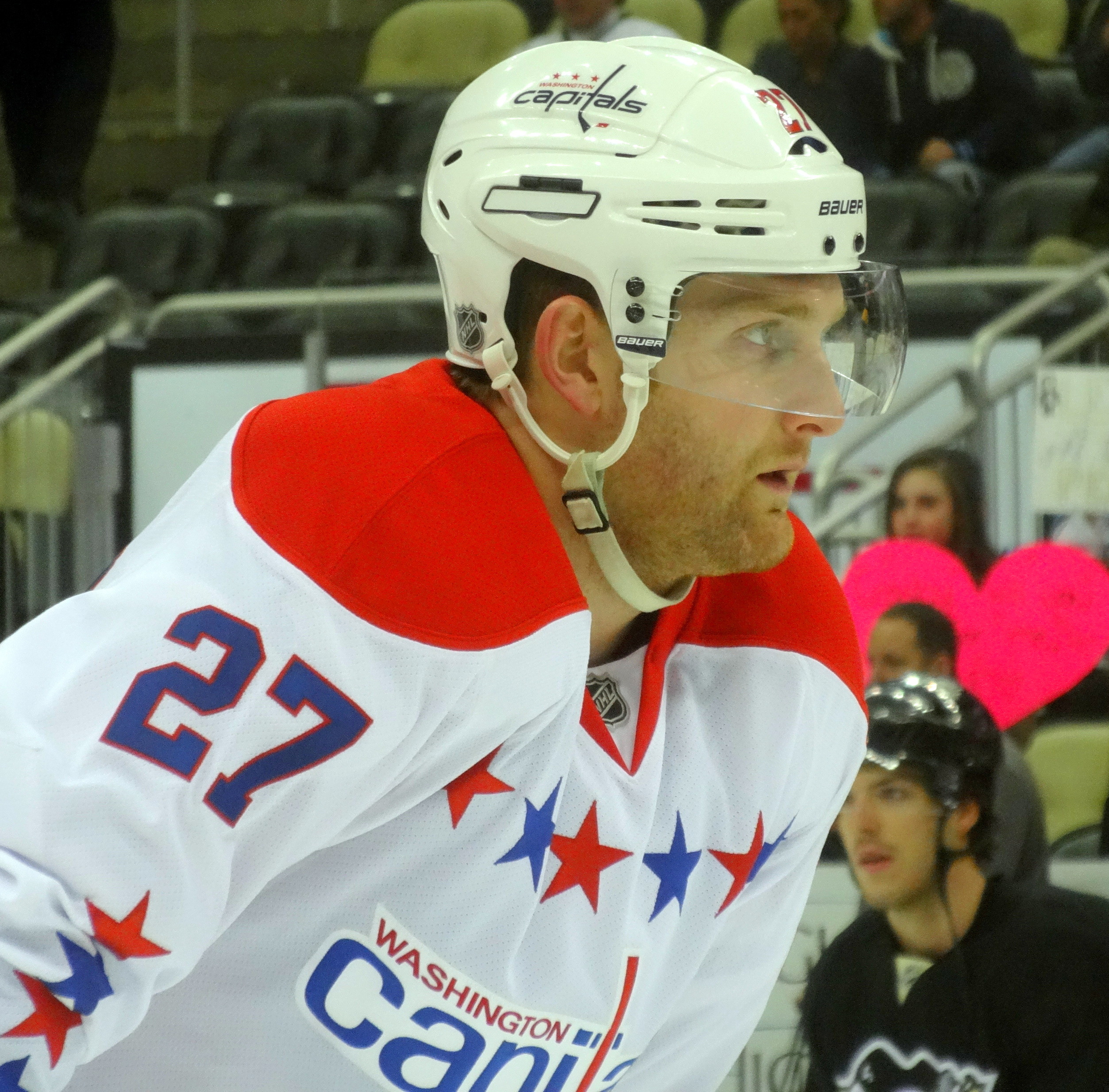
Alzner with the Capitals in March 2013.

In his second season with the Capitals in 2009–10, he was called up to the NHL several times by the Capitals. He played on a defensive pairing with John Carlson in game 7 of the Eastern Conference Quarterfinals vs Montreal. Alzner won his 2nd Calder Cup Championship (2009–10) with the Hershey Bears against the Texas Stars.

On July 15, 2011, Alzner signed a two-year contract with the Washington Capitals.

On July 10, 2013, Alzner signed a four-year contract extensions with the Capitals. Alzner was then invited by Hockey Canada for the 2014 Olympic orientation camp on July 22, 2013.

During the 2015–16 season, on January 27, 2016, Alzner became the Washington Capitals all-time leader in consecutive games played. With 423 consecutive games played he passed Bobby Carpenter for the franchise record. The streak began at the beginning of the 2010–11 season.

==== Montreal Canadiens (2017–2020) ====
On July 1, 2017, having left the Capitals as a free agent after nine seasons, Alzner agreed to a five-year, $23.125 million contract with the Montreal Canadiens. Alzner cited his frustrations with the Capitals playoff shortcomings and that "he wanted to win" by signing with the Canadiens. However, in an ironic twist of fate, the Canadiens as a team finished fourth-to-last in the league in Alzner's first season with the club, 26 points out of a playoff spot while the Capitals would finish the 2017–18 season as the second seed in the Eastern Conference and fifth in the league overall and then go on to win the Stanley Cup for the first time in franchise history having defeated the Vegas Golden Knights in five games in the 2018 Stanley Cup Final.

On October 3, 2018, with the Canadiens' set to open the 2018–19 season against the rival Toronto Maple Leafs, Alzner was announced as a healthy scratch. With the decision, Alzner's iron man streak, the fourth longest among active players at the time, ended. He had played in every NHL game on his team's schedules since 2010–11. On November 27, Alzner was put on waivers by the Montreal Canadiens when their star defenceman and captain Shea Weber was activated from the injury reserve. Alzner was not claimed by any other NHL organization and was assigned to the Laval Rocket of the American Hockey League.

On February 22, 2020, Alzner was recalled by the Canadiens, playing in his first NHL game since January 2019.

On October 6, Alzner was placed on waivers by the Canadiens for the purpose of buying out the remaining two years on his contract. On October 7, Alzner cleared waivers, making him a free agent. Though he never announced his retirement, Alzner went unsigned that summer and never played professional hockey again.

== Personal life ==
Alzner and his wife Mandy have a daughter and son together.

He is a friend of Canadian singer Michael Bublé, whose hometown is also Burnaby, British Columbia. Bublé wore a Capitals jersey Alzner had given him during a concert in Washington D.C. in 2022.

== Career statistics ==
=== Regular season and playoffs ===
| | | | Regular season | | | | | Playoffs |
| Season | Team | League | GP | G | A | Pts | PIM | GP | G | A | Pts | PIM |
|---|---|---|---|---|---|---|---|---|---|---|---|---|
| 2003–04 | Richmond Sockeyes | PIJHL | 41 | 3 | 9 | 12 | 8 | 13 | 0 | 2 | 2 | 0 |
| 2003–04 | Calgary Hitmen | WHL | 1 | 0 | 0 | 0 | 0 | — | — | — | — | — |
| 2004–05 | Calgary Hitmen | WHL | 66 | 0 | 10 | 10 | 19 | 12 | 0 | 3 | 3 | 9 |
| 2005–06 | Calgary Hitmen | WHL | 70 | 4 | 20 | 24 | 28 | 13 | 1 | 3 | 4 | 4 |
| 2006–07 | Calgary Hitmen | WHL | 63 | 8 | 39 | 47 | 32 | 18 | 1 | 12 | 13 | 4 |
| 2007–08 | Calgary Hitmen | WHL | 60 | 7 | 29 | 36 | 15 | 16 | 6 | 2 | 8 | 4 |
| 2008–09 | Hershey Bears | AHL | 48 | 4 | 16 | 20 | 10 | 10 | 0 | 2 | 2 | 2 |
| 2008–09 | Washington Capitals | NHL | 30 | 1 | 4 | 5 | 2 | — | — | — | — | — |
| 2009–10 | Hershey Bears | AHL | 56 | 3 | 18 | 21 | 10 | 20 | 3 | 7 | 10 | 4 |
| 2009–10 | Washington Capitals | NHL | 21 | 0 | 5 | 5 | 8 | 1 | 0 | 0 | 0 | 0 |
| 2010–11 | Washington Capitals | NHL | 82 | 2 | 10 | 12 | 24 | 9 | 0 | 1 | 1 | 0 |
| 2011–12 | Washington Capitals | NHL | 82 | 1 | 16 | 17 | 29 | 14 | 0 | 2 | 2 | 0 |
| 2012–13 | Washington Capitals | NHL | 48 | 1 | 4 | 5 | 14 | 7 | 1 | 1 | 2 | 2 |
| 2013–14 | Washington Capitals | NHL | 82 | 2 | 16 | 18 | 26 | — | — | — | — | — |
| 2014–15 | Washington Capitals | NHL | 82 | 5 | 16 | 21 | 20 | 14 | 2 | 2 | 4 | 6 |
| 2015–16 | Washington Capitals | NHL | 82 | 4 | 17 | 21 | 26 | 12 | 0 | 2 | 2 | 6 |
| 2016–17 | Washington Capitals | NHL | 82 | 3 | 10 | 13 | 28 | 7 | 0 | 0 | 0 | 2 |
| 2017–18 | Montreal Canadiens | NHL | 82 | 1 | 11 | 12 | 40 | — | — | — | — | — |
| 2018–19 | Montreal Canadiens | NHL | 9 | 0 | 1 | 1 | 2 | — | — | — | — | — |
| 2018–19 | Laval Rocket | AHL | 34 | 1 | 5 | 6 | 10 | — | — | — | — | — |
| 2019–20 | Laval Rocket | AHL | 53 | 1 | 12 | 13 | 24 | — | — | — | — | — |
| 2019–20 | Montreal Canadiens | NHL | 4 | 0 | 0 | 0 | 0 | — | — | — | — | — |
| NHL totals | | | 686 | 20 | 110 | 130 | 219 | 64 | 3 | 8 | 11 | 16 |

Medal record

Representing Canada

Ice hockey

World Junior Championships
| Gold medal – first place | 2008 Czech Republic | |
| Gold medal – first place | 2007 Sweden | |

=== International ===
| Year | Team | Event | Result | GP | G | A | Pts | PIM |
|---|---|---|---|---|---|---|---|---|
| 2005 | Canada Pacific | U17 | 2nd place, silver medalist(s) | 6 | 0 | 1 | 1 | 4 |
| 2005 | Canada | U18 | 1st place, gold medalist(s) | 5 | 0 | 0 | 0 | 0 |
| 2007 | Canada | WJC | 1st place, gold medalist(s) | 6 | 0 | 1 | 1 | 2 |
| 2008 | Canada | WJC | 1st place, gold medalist(s) | 7 | 1 | 1 | 2 | 0 |
| Junior totals | | | | 19 | 1 | 3 | 4 | 6 |

== Awards and honours ==
| Award | Year |
|---|---|
WHL
| East First All-Star Team | 2008 |
| East Second All-Star Team | 2007 |
AHL
| Calder Cup Champion | 2009 |
| Calder Cup Champion | 2010 |

Awards and achievements
| Preceded by Semyon Varlamov | Washington Capitals first-round draft pick 2007 | Succeeded by Anton Gustafsson |
| Preceded by Kris Russell | Winner of the CHL Defenceman of the Year; 2008 | Succeeded by Jonathon Blum |
| Preceded by Kris Russell | Winner of the WHL Bill Hunter Memorial Trophy; 2008 | Succeeded by Jonathon Blum |
| Preceded by Kris Russell | Winner of the WHL Four Broncos Memorial Trophy; 2008 | Succeeded by Brett Sonne |
