= Brad Hornung Trophy =

Junior ice hockey award

The Brad Hornung Trophy is awarded annually to the most sportsmanlike player of the Western Hockey League. First presented in 1967, it was later renamed in honour of former Regina Pats player Brad Hornung who was paralyzed during a game on March 1, 1987.

Previously, the Frank Boucher Memorial Trophy. Frank Boucher was Commissioner of the league for its first two seasons. Boucher spent 29 years with the New York Rangers of the National Hockey League as a player, coach, and General Manager winning the Stanley Cup three times. He was awarded the NHL's equivalent trophy the Lady Byng seven times in eight years and was inducted into the Hockey Hall of Fame in 1958.

== List of winners ==
Frank Boucher Memorial Trophy
Season	Player	Team
1966–67	Morris Stefaniw	Estevan Bruins
1967–68	Bernie Blanchette	Saskatoon Blades
1968–69	Bob Liddington	Calgary Centennials
1969–70	Randy Rota	Calgary Centennials
1970–71	Lorne Henning	Estevan Bruins
1971–72	Ron Chipperfield	Brandon Wheat Kings
1972–73	Ron Chipperfield	Brandon Wheat Kings
1973–74	Mike Rogers	Calgary Centennials
1974–75	Danny Arndt	Saskatoon Blades
1975–76	Blair Chapman	Saskatoon Blades
1976–77	Steve Tambellini	Lethbridge Broncos
1977–78	Steve Tambellini	Lethbridge Broncos
1978–79	Errol Rausse	Seattle Breakers
1979–80	Steve Tsujiura	Medicine Hat Tigers
1980–81	Steve Tsujiura	Medicine Hat Tigers
1981–82	Mike Moller	Lethbridge Broncos
1982–83	Darren Boyko	Winnipeg Warriors
1983–84	Mark Lamb	Medicine Hat Tigers
1984–85	Cliff Ronning	New Westminster Bruins
1985–86^{1}	(West) Ken Morrison	Kamloops Blazers
	(East) Randy Smith	Saskatoon Blades
1986–87^{1}	(West) Dave Archibald	Portland Winter Hawks
	(East) Len Nielsen	Regina Pats
Brad Hornung Trophy
Season	Player	Team
1987–88	Craig Endean	Regina Pats
1988–89	Blair Atcheynum	Moose Jaw Warriors
1989–90	Bryan Bosch	Lethbridge Hurricanes
1990–91	Pat Falloon	Spokane Chiefs
1991–92	Steve Junker	Spokane Chiefs
1992–93	Rick Girard	Swift Current Broncos
1993–94	Lonny Bohonos	Portland Winter Hawks
1994–95	Darren Ritchie	Brandon Wheat Kings
1995–96	Hnat Domenichelli	Kamloops Blazers
1996–97	Kelly Smart	Brandon Wheat Kings
1997–98	Cory Cyrenne	Brandon Wheat Kings
1998–99	Matt Kinch	Calgary Hitmen
1999–2000	Trent Hunter	Prince George Cougars
2000–01	Matt Kinch	Calgary Hitmen
2001–02	Ian White	Swift Current Broncos
2002–03	Boyd Gordon	Red Deer Rebels
2003–04	Nigel Dawes	Kootenay Ice
2004–05	Kris Russell	Medicine Hat Tigers
2005–06	Kris Russell	Medicine Hat Tigers
2006–07	Aaron Gagnon	Seattle Thunderbirds
2007–08	Tyler Ennis	Medicine Hat Tigers
2008–09	Tyler Ennis	Medicine Hat Tigers
2009–10	Jason Bast	Moose Jaw Warriors
2010–11	Tyler Johnson	Spokane Chiefs
2011–12	Mark Stone	Brandon Wheat Kings
2012–13	Dylan Wruck	Edmonton Oil Kings
2013–14	Sam Reinhart	Kootenay Ice
2014–15	Rourke Chartier	Kelowna Rockets
2015–16	Tyler Soy	Victoria Royals
2016–17	Tyler Steenbergen	Swift Current Broncos
2017–18	Aleksi Heponiemi	Swift Current Broncos
2018–19	Justin Almeida	Moose Jaw Warriors
2019–20	Seth Jarvis	Portland Winterhawks
2020–21	Eli Zummack	Spokane Chiefs
2021–22	Logan Stankoven	Kamloops Blazers
2022–23	Brayden Yager	Moose Jaw Warriors
2023–24	Brayden Yager	Moose Jaw Warriors
2024–25	Berkly Catton	Spokane Chiefs
2025–26	Braeden Cootes	Prince Albert Raiders

- Blue background denotes also named CHL Sportsman of the Year

^{1}The WHL handed out separate awards for the East and West divisions.

== See also ==
- CHL Sportsman of the Year
- William Hanley Trophy - Ontario Hockey League Sportsman of the Year
- Frank J. Selke Memorial Trophy - Quebec Major Junior Hockey League Sportsman of the Year
