= Michael Stone (ice hockey) =

Canadian ice hockey player

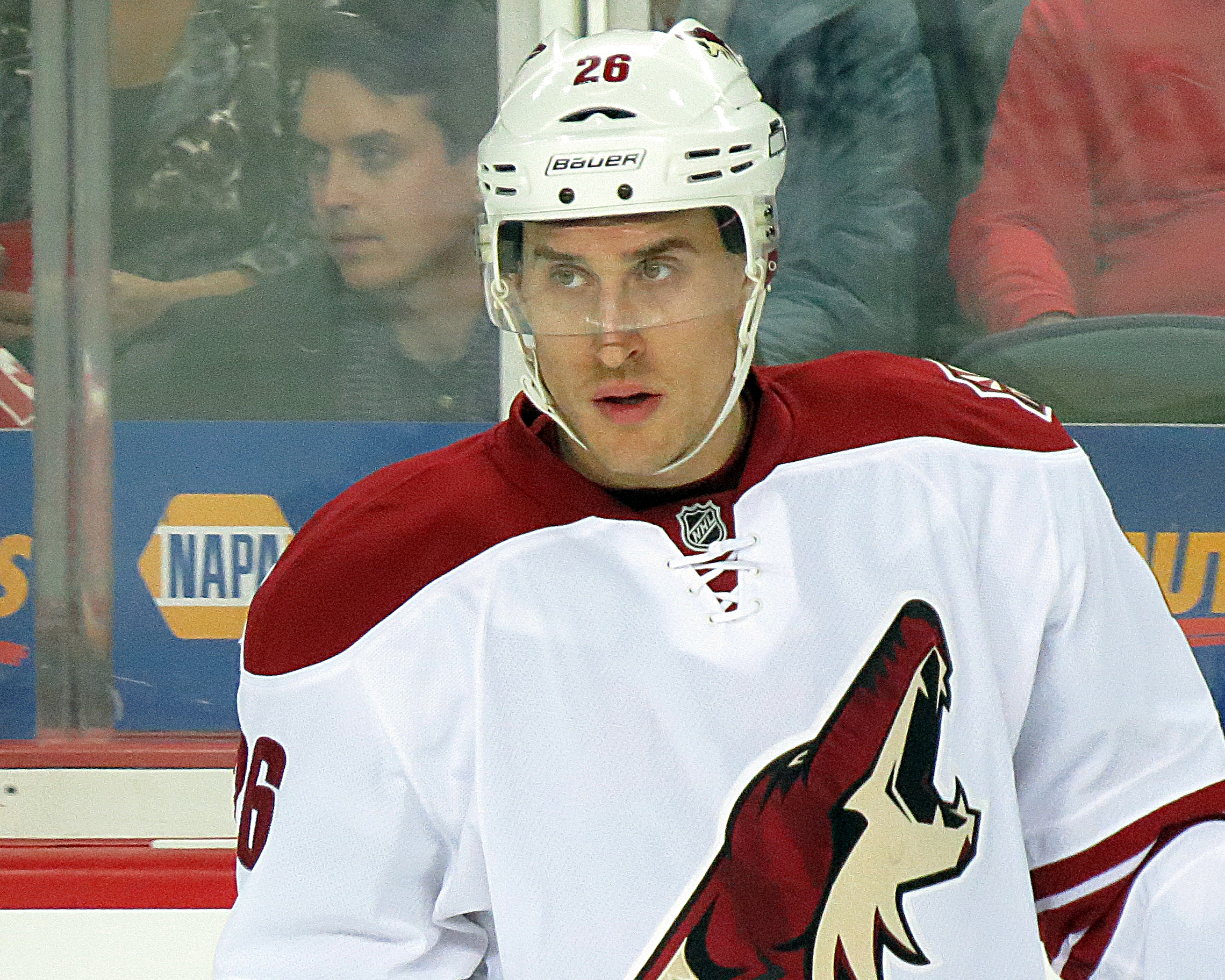
- Stone with the Phoenix Coyotes in 2014
- Born: June 7, 1990 (age 36) Winnipeg, Manitoba, Canada
- Height: 6 ft 3 in (191 cm)
- Weight: 210 lb (95 kg; 15 st 0 lb)
- Position: Defence
- Shot: Right
- Played for: Arizona Coyotes; Calgary Flames
- NHL draft: 69th overall, 2008; Phoenix Coyotes
- Playing career: 2010–2023

Michael Robert Stone (born June 7, 1990) is a Canadian former professional ice hockey defenceman. He played in the National Hockey League (NHL) with the Arizona Coyotes and the Calgary Flames. He was selected by the then Phoenix Coyotes in the third round (69th overall) in the 2008 NHL entry draft.

== Early life ==
Stone was born on June 7, 1990, in Winnipeg, Manitoba, to parents Rob and Jackie Stone. His younger brother Mark Stone also plays professional ice hockey. Growing up, his favourite National Hockey League (NHL) team was the Detroit Red Wings and his favourite players were Steve Yzerman and Nicklas Lidström.

== Playing career ==
=== Amateur ===
Growing up in Winnipeg, Stone played for the Winnipeg Hawks U15 and Winnipeg Thrashers U18 AAA teams. He was then drafted 73rd overall by the Calgary Hitmen of the Western Hockey League (WHL) in the 2005 WHL Prospect Draft. In his rookie season with the Hitmen, Stone scored two goals and 18 assists. He shared the Hitmen's Rookie of the Year award with Martin Jones and was invited to try out for Team Canada's national men's summer under-18 team. In his sophomore season, Stone tied a franchise record for most powerplay points, most powerplay assists, and most assists by a defenceman in a single game. He also tied Brad Stuart's franchise record for longest goal streak by a defenceman. He finished the 2007–08 season with 35 points and was ranked 39th overall amongst all North American skaters by the NHL Central Scouting Bureau. Stone interviewed with 15 NHL teams before being selected 69th overall in the 2008 NHL entry draft by the Phoenix Coyotes. Following the draft, Stone was invited to participate in the Coyote's summer camp and regular-season training camp. While he was unable to attend their summer camp due to high school exams, he joined their regular-season camp in September 2008. Stone finished the regular season with a career-high 19 goals and 42 assists for 61 points. In recognition of his efforts, Stone was named to the 2008–09 East Second All-Star Team.

Stone returned to the Hitmen for the 2009–10 season as team co-captain. He quickly scored six goals and seven assists through his first 13 games to help lead the Hitmen to a 12–3 winning record. By December, Stone was tied for first among all WHL defensemen in scoring with 13 goals 21 assists for 34 points. He signed an entry-level contract with the Phoenix Coyotes on December 10, 2009. Stone finished the regular season with a career-high 21 goals and 44 assists. He was nominated for the WHL's Defenceman of the Year award and selected for the East First All-Star Team.

=== Professional ===
Stone made his NHL debut on February 18, 2012, recording 11:31 of ice-time in a 2–1 overtime win over the Dallas Stars. He then scored his first NHL goal on March 10, 2012, in a 3–0 win over the San Jose Sharks. Ultimately, Stone scored 1 goal and 2 assists in 13 games during the 2011–12 season.

Stone spent the early part of the 2012–13 season with the Portland Pirates, the Coyotes' AHL affiliate, due to the 2012–13 NHL lockout, but joined the Coyotes again after the lockout ended. He scored 5 goals and 4 assists for 9 points in 40 games. After the season, the Coyotes signed Stone to a three-year, $3.45 million contract extension on July 6, 2013.

After a successful 2015–16 season that saw Stone post a career-high 36 points for the Coyotes, he signed a one-year, $4 million contract extension with the Coyotes, avoiding salary arbitration on July 29, 2016.

On February 20, 2017, Stone was traded to the Calgary Flames in exchange for a 2017 third-round pick and a 2018 conditional fifth-round pick. He recorded six points in 19 games to close out the season.

On June 30, 2017, the Flames re-signed Stone to a three-year, $10.5 million contract extension.

After appearing in just eleven games to start the 2018–19 season, the Flames placed Stone on Injured Reserve with a blood clot on November 22. He made his return to the Flames' lineup on March 16, 2019 in a 2–1 loss to the Winnipeg Jets. However, he served mostly as a healthy scratch following this game, appearing in only two more games and sitting out the entirety of the Flames' postseason games.

On August 2, 2019, the Flames bought out the final year of Stone's contract, making him an unrestricted free agent. On September 11, Stone re-joined the Flames, signing a one-year, $700,000 contract. On January 18, 2021, Stone signed a one-year contract with the Flames.

Prior to the 2021–22 season, Stone was again re-signed by the Flames as a free agent, agreeing to a one-year, $750,000 contract on September 10, 2021.

== Post-retirement ==
After retiring from professional hockey on July 5, 2023, Stone became a member of the Flames' player development team.

== Personal life ==
Stone married his wife Michelle de Villenfagne in 2015. They had met while Stone was billeted with Michelle's family while playing in the WHL.

== Career statistics ==
			Regular season					Playoffs
Season	Team	League	GP	G	A	Pts	PIM	GP	G	A	Pts	PIM
2006–07	Calgary Hitmen	WHL	55	2	18	20	32	17	0	3	3	14
2007–08	Calgary Hitmen	WHL	71	10	25	35	28	14	3	4	7	10
2008–09	Calgary Hitmen	WHL	69	19	42	61	87	18	2	11	13	16
2009–10	Calgary Hitmen	WHL	69	21	44	65	91	23	5	15	20	26
2010–11	San Antonio Rampage	AHL	70	2	11	13	27	—	—	—	—	—
2011–12	Portland Pirates	AHL	51	9	13	22	24	—	—	—	—	—
2011–12	Phoenix Coyotes	NHL	13	1	2	3	2	2	0	0	0	0
2012–13	Portland Pirates	AHL	36	6	22	28	20	—	—	—	—	—
2012–13	Phoenix Coyotes	NHL	40	5	4	9	16	—	—	—	—	—
2013–14	Phoenix Coyotes	NHL	70	8	13	21	38	—	—	—	—	—
2014–15	Arizona Coyotes	NHL	81	3	15	18	60	—	—	—	—	—
2015–16	Arizona Coyotes	NHL	75	6	30	36	62	—	—	—	—	—
2016–17	Arizona Coyotes	NHL	45	1	8	9	12	—	—	—	—	—
2016–17	Calgary Flames	NHL	19	2	4	6	20	4	1	0	1	0
2017–18	Calgary Flames	NHL	82	3	7	10	28	—	—	—	—	—
2018–19	Calgary Flames	NHL	14	0	5	5	10	—	—	—	—	—
2018–19	Stockton Heat	AHL	3	0	2	2	2	—	—	—	—	—
2019–20	Calgary Flames	NHL	33	2	5	7	16	—	—	—	—	—
2020–21	Stockton Heat	AHL	4	2	0	2	6	—	—	—	—	—
2020–21	Calgary Flames	NHL	21	2	2	4	6	—	—	—	—	—
2021–22	Calgary Flames	NHL	11	2	4	6	4	9	2	3	5	4
2022–23	Calgary Flames	NHL	48	6	5	11	35	—	—	—	—	—
NHL totals			552	41	104	145	309	15	3	3	6	4

== Awards and honours ==
Award	Year	Ref
WHL
East Second All-Star Team	2008–09	
East First All-Star Team	2009–10	
