= Brett Sonne =

Canadian ice hockey player

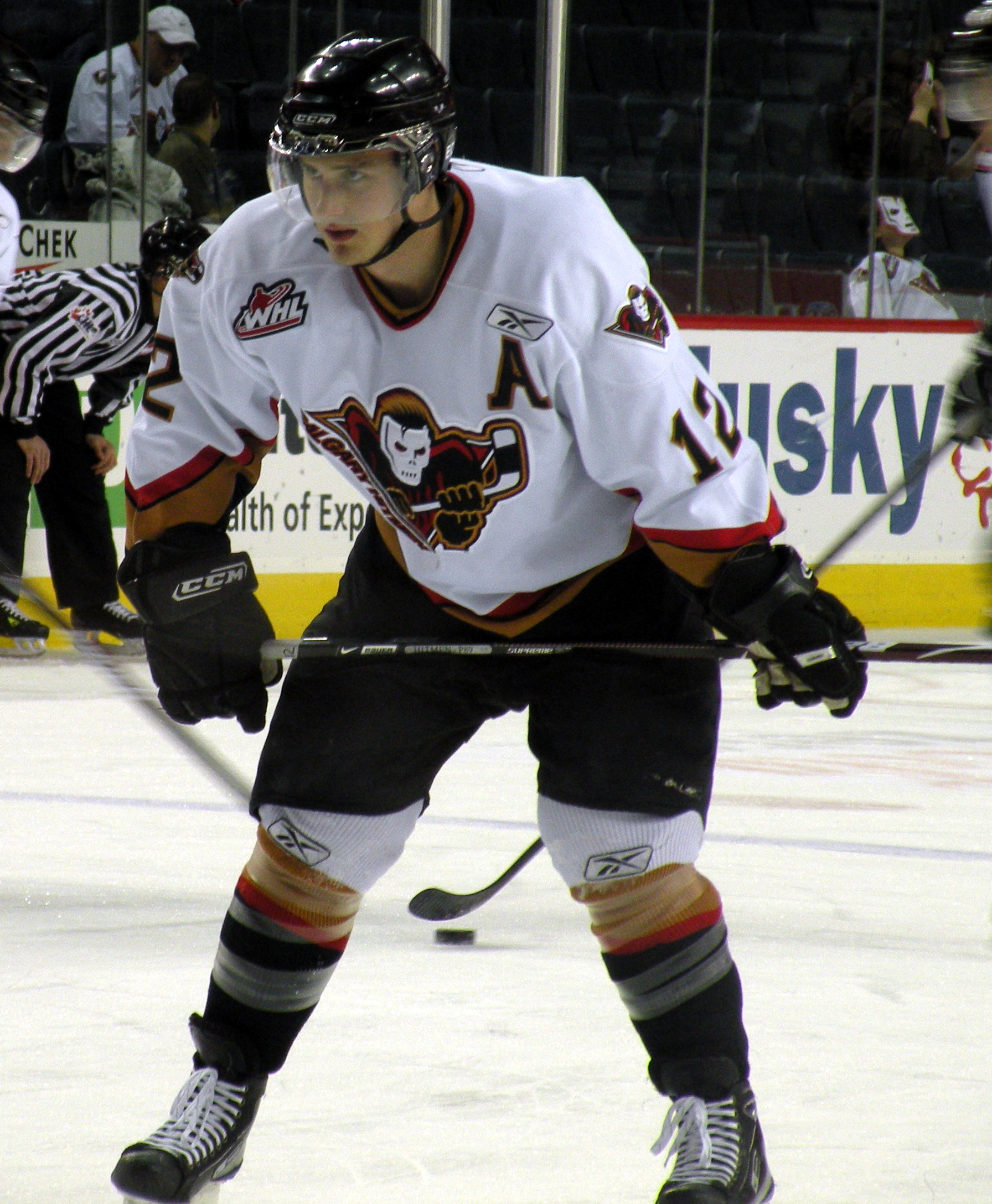
- Sonne with the Calgary Hitmen in 2009
- Born: May 16, 1989 (age 37) Chilliwack, British Columbia, Canada
- Height: 6 ft 0 in (183 cm)
- Weight: 184 lb (83 kg; 13 st 2 lb)
- Position: Centre
- Shot: Left
- Played for: Peoria Rivermen; Texas Stars; Dornbirner EC; Mora IK; Frisk Asker; HC '05 Banská Bystrica; SG Cortina; Herlev Eagles; Ducs d'Angers
- NHL draft: 85th overall, 2007; St. Louis Blues
- Playing career: 2009–2018

Brett Sonne (born May 16, 1989) is a Canadian former professional ice hockey centre. He is a former prospect of the St. Louis Blues organization, having been selected by the Blues in the third round, 85th overall, in the 2007 NHL entry draft. He is the 2009 recipient of the Four Broncos Memorial Trophy as WHL player of the year. Sonne was a member of the gold medal winning Canadian team at the 2009 World Junior Ice Hockey Championships

== Playing career ==
Sonne began his major junior career with the Calgary Hitmen of the WHL in 2004–05, playing in six games as a 15-year-old. After a 21-point rookie campaign in 2005–06, he scored 21 goals the next season and was subsequently drafted 85th overall in the 2007 NHL entry draft by the St. Louis Blues. A strong start in the 2007–08 season was derailed when he suffered a broken ankle in November 2007 that caused him to miss the majority of the regular season. He emerged as a top player in the WHL, finishing third in league scoring in 2008–09 with 100 points 62 games. He was named to the WHL East First All-Star Team, along with teammates Paul Postma and Brandon Kozun, and won the Four Broncos Memorial Trophy as WHL player of the year, beating out Western Conference nominee and Bob Clarke Trophy-winner Casey Pierro-Zabotel of the Vancouver Giants.

Sonne's dedication to improving his overall game as well as his leadership abilities earned him a spot with the Canadian junior team at the 2009 World Junior Ice Hockey Championships. He recorded one goal and two assists in six games, as Canada won its fifth consecutive gold medal at the tournament.

On April 9, 2013, Sonne was traded from the Texas Stars to the Peoria Rivermen for defenseman Carl Sneep. Both players are considered to be loaned and remain property of their respective clubs.

After four seasons within the Blues organization, Sonne was released as a free agent and signed a one-year contract with Austrian club Dornbirner EC of the EBEL on July 30, 2013.

== Career statistics ==
=== Regular season and playoffs ===
			Regular season					Playoffs
Season	Team	League	GP	G	A	Pts	PIM	GP	G	A	Pts	PIM
2004–05	Calgary Hitmen	WHL	6	0	0	0	2	—	—	—	—	—
2005–06	Calgary Hitmen	WHL	64	12	9	21	38	13	1	2	3	8
2006–07	Calgary Hitmen	WHL	71	21	9	30	65	18	5	1	6	22
2007–08	Calgary Hitmen	WHL	29	8	12	20	12	16	3	1	4	14
2008–09	Calgary Hitmen	WHL	62	48	52	100	58	14	7	9	16	18
2009–10	Peoria Rivermen	AHL	77	11	13	24	33	—	—	—	—	—
2010–11	Peoria Rivermen	AHL	62	5	4	9	45	4	0	0	0	2
2011–12	Peoria Rivermen	AHL	70	8	9	17	40	—	—	—	—	—
2012–13	Evansville IceMen	ECHL	7	3	4	7	2	—	—	—	—	—
2012–13	Peoria Rivermen	AHL	56	7	8	15	14	—	—	—	—	—
2012–13	Texas Stars	AHL	6	1	2	3	2	2	0	1	1	0
2013–14	Dornbirner EC	EBEL	43	7	23	30	19	6	2	3	5	24
2014–15	Mora IK	Allsv	35	4	3	7	12	—	—	—	—	—
2014–15	Frisk Asker	GET	12	5	8	13	6	6	1	2	3	4
2015–16	HC '05 Banská Bystrica	Slovak	7	0	3	3	0	—	—	—	—	—
2015–16	SG Cortina	ITL	17	6	11	17	13	—	—	—	—	—
2016–17	Herlev Eagles	DEN	37	10	21	31	22	—	—	—	—	—
2017–18	Ducs d'Angers	FRA	35	15	8	23	14	5	0	1	1	0
AHL totals			271	32	36	68	134	6	0	1	1	2

Medal record

Representing Canada

Men's ice hockey

World Junior Championship
Gold medal – first place	2009 Canada	

=== International ===
Year	Team	Event	Result	GP	G	A	Pts	PIM
2006	Canada Pacific	U17	4th	6	2	1	3	4
2006	Canada	IH18	1st place, gold medalist(s)	4	5	1	6	4
2009	Canada	WJC	1st place, gold medalist(s)	6	1	2	3	0
Junior totals				16	8	4	12	8

== Awards and honours ==
Award	Year
WHL
CHL/NHL Top Prospects Game	2007
East First All-Star Team	2009
Four Broncos Memorial Trophy (Player of the Year)	2009
CHL Second All-Star Team	2009
