= WHL Plus-Minus Award =

The Plus-Minus Award is given annually to the player who finishes with the top plus/minus in the Western Hockey League. It has been awarded since 1987.

== List of winners ==
| Season | Player | Team | +/- |
| 1986–87 | Rob Brown | Kamloops Blazers | +55 |
| 1987–88 | Mark Recchi | Kamloops Blazers | +77 |
| 1988–89 | Darren Stolk | Medicine Hat Tigers | +40 |
| 1989–90 | Len Barrie | Kamloops Blazers | +87 |
| 1990–91 | Frank Evans | Spokane Chiefs | +72 |
| 1991–92 | Dean McAmmond | Prince Albert Raiders | +56 |
| 1992–93 | Mark Wotton | Saskatoon Blades | +47 |
| 1993–94 | Mark Wotton | Saskatoon Blades | +66 |
| 1994–95 | Darren Ritchie | Brandon Wheat Kings | +64 |
| 1995–96 | Hugh Hamilton | Spokane Chiefs | +59 |
| 1996–97 | Peter Schaefer | Brandon Wheat Kings | +57 |
| 1997–98 | Andrew Ference | Portland Winter Hawks | +75 |
| 1998–99 | Pavel Brendl | Calgary Hitmen | +68 |
| 1999–2000 | Kenton Smith | Calgary Hitmen | +65 |
| 2000–01 | Jim Vandermeer | Red Deer Rebels | +49 |
| 2001–02 | Matt Hubbauer | Regina Pats | +37 |
| 2002–03 | Matthew Spiller | Seattle Thunderbirds | +50 |
| 2003–04 | Andrew Ladd | Calgary Hitmen | +39 |
| 2004–05 | James Cherewyk | Kootenay Ice | +39 |
| 2005–06 | Paul Albers | Vancouver Giants | +38 |
| 2006–07 | Jonathon Blum | Vancouver Giants | +37 |
| 2007–08 | Greg Scott | Seattle Thunderbirds | +40 |
| 2008–09 | Paul Postma | Calgary Hitmen | +67 |
| 2009–10 | Colby Robak | Brandon Wheat Kings | +56 |
| 2010–11 | Stefan Elliott | Saskatoon Blades | +62 |
| 2011–12 | Mark Stone; Zach Yuen; Brendan Shinnimin | Brandon Wheat Kings; Tri-City Americans; Tri-City Americans | +45 |
| 2012–13 | Nic Petan | Portland Winterhawks | +68 |
| 2013–14 | Colten Martin | Kelowna Rockets | +61 |
| 2014–15 | Oliver Bjorkstrand | Portland Winterhawks | +60 |
| 2015–16 | Ivan Provorov | Brandon Wheat Kings | +64 |
| 2016–17 | Sergey Zborovskiy | Regina Pats | +72 |
| 2017–18 | Glenn Gawdin | Swift Current Broncos | +61 |
| 2018–19 | Brayden Pachal | Prince Albert Raiders | +76 |
| 2019–20 | Noah King | Spokane Chiefs | +60 |
| 2020–21 | Jake Neighbours | Edmonton Oil Kings | +29 |
| 2021–22 | Nolan Orzeck | Winnipeg Ice | +62 |
| 2022–23 | Jeremy Hanzel | Seattle Thunderbirds | +70 |
| 2023–24 | Zac Funk | Prince George Cougars | +56 |
| 2024–25 | Gavin McKenna | Medicine Hat Tigers | +60 |
| 2025–26 | Tarin Smith | Everett Silvertips | +65 |

== See also ==
- AutoPro Plaque - Quebec Major Junior Hockey League Plus-Minus award (defunct)
