= Kris Russell =

Canadian ice hockey player (born 1987)

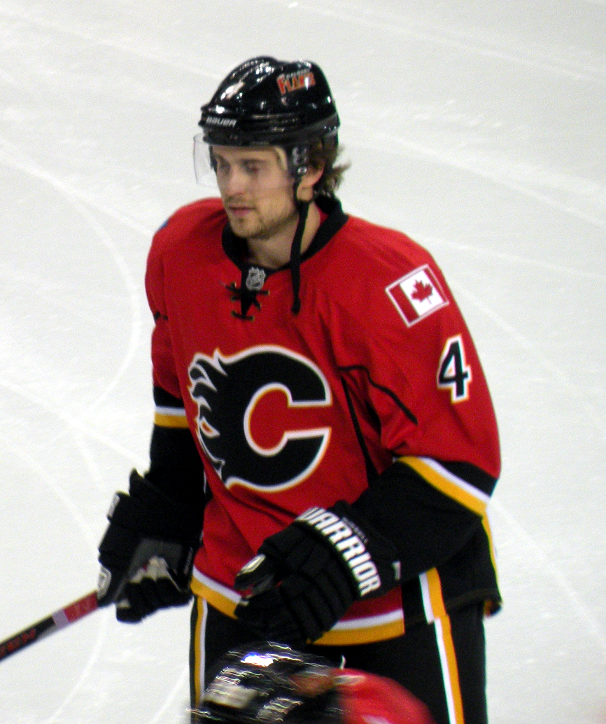
- Russell with the Calgary Flames in 2013
- Born: May 2, 1987 (age 39) Caroline, Alberta, Canada
- Height: 5 ft 10 in (178 cm)
- Weight: 180 lb (82 kg; 12 st 12 lb)
- Position: Defence
- Shot: Left
- Played for: Columbus Blue Jackets; St. Louis Blues; TPS; Calgary Flames; Dallas Stars; Edmonton Oilers
- National team: Canada
- NHL draft: 67th overall, 2005; Columbus Blue Jackets
- Playing career: 2007–2022

Kris Russell (born May 2, 1987) is a Canadian former professional ice hockey defenceman. He most recently played in the 2021–22 season, for the Edmonton Oilers of the National Hockey League (NHL). He was originally drafted in the third round, 67th overall, by the Columbus Blue Jackets in the 2005 NHL entry draft and played four seasons with the team before moving on to the St. Louis Blues, Calgary Flames and Dallas Stars. He has also played for TPS and Oulun Kärpät in the Finnish Liiga.

Russell was a top defenceman in junior hockey with the Western Hockey League (WHL)'s Medicine Hat Tigers. He was a member of two WHL championship teams, was twice named the WHL's top defenceman, and won the Four Broncos Memorial Trophy as the WHL's most outstanding player in 2006–07. Internationally, Russell has represented Canada on several occasions: he was a member of two gold medal-winning teams at the World Junior Championship and has played in two World Championships. Russell is known for his ability and willingness to block shots, formerly having held the NHL record for blocked shots; he has since been surpassed by former teammate Mark Giordano. He and his twin brother Ryan briefly played together in Columbus.

== Early life ==
Kris Russell was born May 2, 1987, in Red Deer, Alberta. He has an identical twin brother, Ryan, born to mother Terri and father Doug. They grew up in the nearby village of Caroline. Doug was a professional bull fighter on Alberta's rodeo circuit – someone who protects bull riders while they escape the ring following their rides by distracting the bulls – and made four appearances at the Canadian Finals Rodeo, but left the sport when his sons were born. Kris was coached by his father for much of his minor hockey career and was moved to defence by Doug when he was ten years old.

== Playing career ==
=== Junior ===
The Medicine Hat Tigers selected Russell with their eighth round selection, 138th overall at the 2002 Western Hockey League (WHL) Bantam Draft. He played four seasons with the Tigers and the first time he played Ryan, who was a member of the Kootenay Ice, in a game, the brothers fought each other. Kris described the event as "fun" while noting that neither was trying to hurt the other. He was a member of league championship teams in his first season, 2003–04, and his last, 2006–07. Russell was highly decorated in his junior career. He was named to a WHL All-Star Team three times and was twice named recipient of the Brad Hornung Trophy as the league's most sportsmanlike player. He twice led the league in goal scoring and won the Bill Hunter Memorial Trophy as the top defenceman in both 2005–06 and 2006–07. In his final WHL season, Russell was also named the winner of the Four Broncos Memorial Trophy as the WHL's most outstanding player and was named the Canadian Hockey League's Defenceman of the Year.

Internationally, Russell twice represented Canada as a member of the national junior team. He first played at the 2006 World Junior Championship where he recorded one goal and three assists for the gold medal-winning Canadians. Returning for the 2007 tournament, Russell tied Jonathan Toews for the team lead with four goals as Canada again won the gold medal.

=== Professional career ===
==== Columbus and St. Louis ====
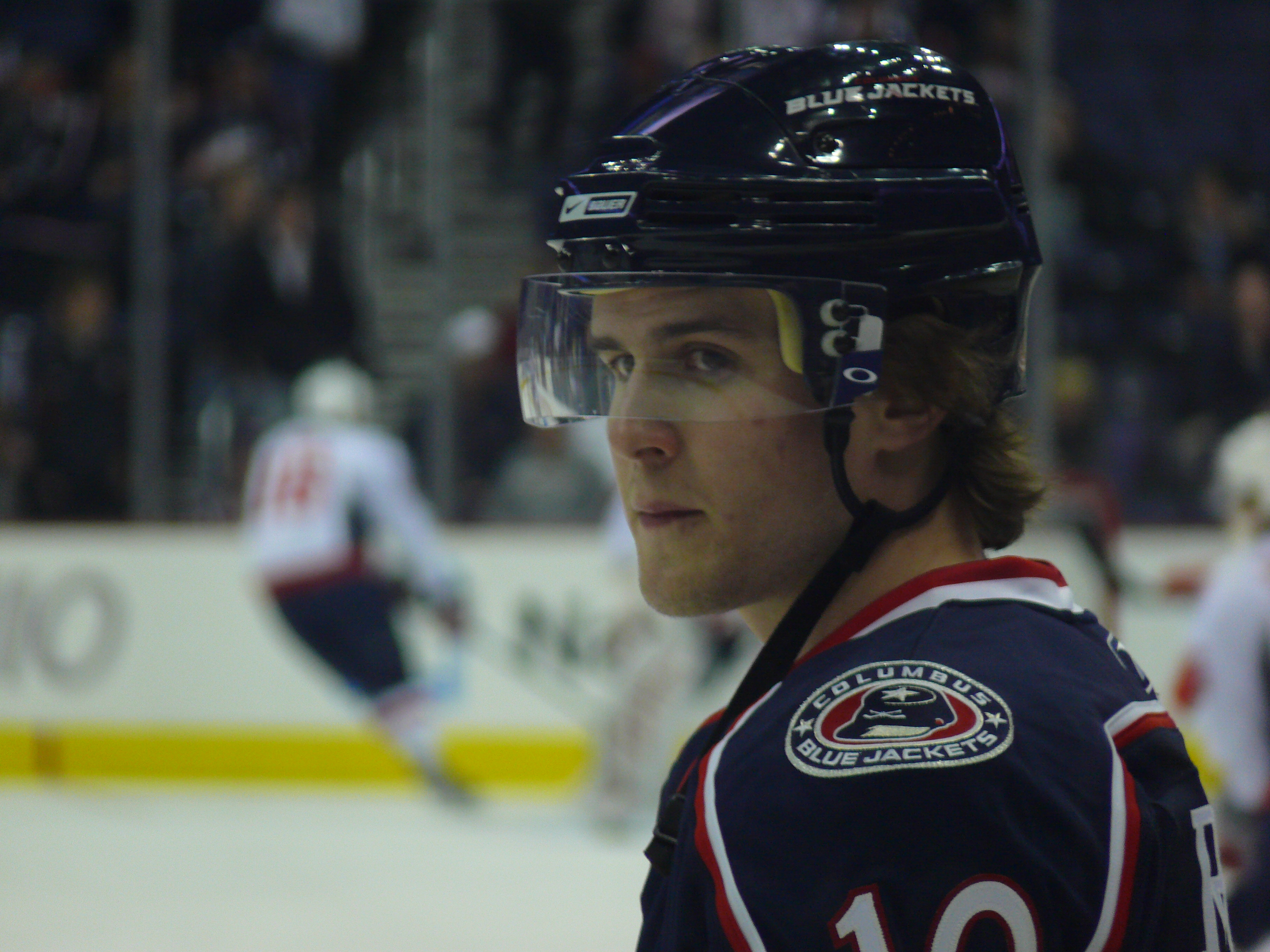
Russell as a member of the Columbus Blue Jackets in 2008

The Columbus Blue Jackets selected Russell with their third-round pick, 67th overall, at the 2005 NHL entry draft. Shorter and lighter than his peers throughout minor hockey, he was often told he was too small to play in the NHL. Listed at five feet, ten inches tall, Russell defied expectations and earned a spot with the Blue Jackets in his first professional season, 2007–08 season. He made his NHL debut and scored his first point with an assist in a 4–0 victory over the Anaheim Ducks on October 5, 2007. Russell's first two NHL goals came on January 22, 2008, against goaltender Mike Smith, and was named the first star in a 4–2 win over the Dallas Stars. He added eight assists to finish with 10 points in 67 games for Columbus.

Russell spent the majority of the 2008–09 season with the Blue Jackets but also played 14 games with their American Hockey League (AHL) affiliate, the Syracuse Crunch. He had 21 points in 66 games with Columbus and added a goal and an assist in his first four NHL playoff games. He led Blue Jackets' defencemen with seven goals in 2009–10 and set a career high with 23 points in 73 games in 2010–11. He was briefly a teammate of his brother as the Blue Jackets acquired Ryan before the 2011–12 season. However, Russell only played 12 games for Columbus that season, as he was traded to the St. Louis Blues in exchange for Nikita Nikitin in a November 11, 2011, trade. The deal reunited Russell with Ken Hitchcock, who had previously coached him in Columbus before becoming the head coach of the Blues.

In 55 games combined between Columbus and St. Louis, Russell scored 12 points and made his second Stanley Cup playoff appearance by playing nine post-season games with St. Louis. When the 2012–13 season was delayed by a labour dispute, he signed with TPS in the Finnish SM-liiga. He suffered a slight tear to his Medial collateral ligament early in the season and missed some time before rejoining TPS. He recorded 14 points in 15 games before returning to St. Louis when the NHL season finally began. With the Blues, Russell recorded seven points in 33 games but dropped down the Blues' depth chart and did not appear in any 2013 playoff games for the team.

A restricted free agent following the season, Blues management doubted he would be one of the club's top seven defencemen. He was placed on waivers and went unclaimed. The Calgary Flames acquired Russell on July 5, 2013, in exchange for a fifth round selection at the 2014 NHL entry draft and signed him to a one-year, $1.5 million contract.

==== Calgary Flames ====
In his first year in Calgary, Russell was leaned on heavily, emerging as a top-four defensively-oriented defenseman. Paired most frequently with Dennis Wideman, the two formed the Flames' second pairing for the majority of the season. Russell set new career-highs in assists and points in 2013–14, tallying 22 and 29 in those respective categories. He also finished second on the team in blocked shots with 201, only behind Chris Butler (211).

As the Flames improved significantly in 2014–15, so did Russell. Once again, he posted new career-highs in assists and points, with 30 and 34, respectively, and he also led the NHL in blocked shots with 283. This mark sits as the NHL record for most shots blocked by a single player in a season. With star and captain Mark Giordano injured late in the season as the Flames pushed towards a playoff spot, Russell emerged as a temporary top-pairing defenseman in lieu, forming a dangerous shutdown tandem with Wideman once again. This continued into the 2015 playoffs, as Russell proved to be a clutch force throughout the Flames' six-game victory over the Vancouver Canucks in the first round. One notable moment came in Game 1 of the series, in which the Flames had trailed until just past the midway mark of the third period; first, David Jones scored to tie the game, and then Russell fired a wrist shot from the point which beat Canucks goaltender Eddie Läck to put the Flames up by one goal with under 30 seconds remaining. Russell finished the post-season with seven points, third on the Flames.

The Flames regressed in 2015–16, as did Russell. His assist and point totals dramatically sank to just 11 and 15, as the Flames dropped in the standings and missed the 2016 playoffs. With this fate becoming evident, Flames general manager Brad Treliving sought to sell some of his assets at the trade deadline. With his contract expiring at the end of the year, Russell was traded to the Dallas Stars in exchange for defenseman Jyrki Jokipakka, prospect Brett Pollock and a conditional second-round pick (ultimately used to select Dillon Dubé).

==== Dallas and Edmonton ====
In Dallas, Russell was relied on to play top-pairing minutes, but the team fizzled out in the second round to the St. Louis Blues. Russell was held goalless throughout the playoffs, and he was not re-signed by the Stars in the off-season.

On October 7, 2016, with the Edmonton Oilers having cleared cap space in the trade of Nail Yakupov, Russell belatedly signed as a free agent to a one-year, $3.1 million contract for the 2016–17 season. Used in a defensively-minded role, Russell enjoyed limited offensive success but slotted in as the team's de facto fourth defenseman alongside fellow veteran Andrej Sekera. Much like the Flames in 2015, the Oilers made the playoffs in 2016–17 season for the first time in years, but lost in the second round to the Anaheim Ducks, and for the second year in a row, Russell was held goalless in the playoffs.

Encouraged by his play, the Oilers announced on June 23, 2017, they had re-signed Russell to a four-year contract worth $4 million per season. During a game against the Vegas Golden Knights in November 2021, Russell became the NHL's all-time leader in shots blocked with 1,999.

== Career statistics ==
=== Regular season and playoffs ===
			Regular season					Playoffs
Season	Team	League	GP	G	A	Pts	PIM	GP	G	A	Pts	PIM
2003–04	Medicine Hat Tigers	WHL	55	4	15	19	30	20	3	2	5	4
2004–05	Medicine Hat Tigers	WHL	72	26	35	61	37	10	2	1	3	4
2005–06	Medicine Hat Tigers	WHL	55	14	33	47	18	13	4	8	12	11
2006–07	Medicine Hat Tigers	WHL	59	32	37	69	56	23	4	15	19	24
2007–08	Columbus Blue Jackets	NHL	67	2	8	10	14	—	—	—	—	—
2008–09	Columbus Blue Jackets	NHL	66	2	19	21	28	4	1	1	2	2
2009–10	Columbus Blue Jackets	NHL	70	7	15	22	32	—	—	—	—	—
2010–11	Columbus Blue Jackets	NHL	73	5	18	23	37	—	—	—	—	—
2011–12	Columbus Blue Jackets	NHL	12	2	1	3	13	—	—	—	—	—
2011–12	St. Louis Blues	NHL	43	4	5	9	12	9	0	3	3	5
2012–13	TPS	SM-l	15	2	12	14	8	—	—	—	—	—
2012–13	St. Louis Blues	NHL	33	1	6	7	9	—	—	—	—	—
2013–14	Calgary Flames	NHL	68	7	22	29	15	—	—	—	—	—
2014–15	Calgary Flames	NHL	79	4	30	34	17	11	2	5	7	7
2015–16	Calgary Flames	NHL	51	4	11	15	8	—	—	—	—	—
2015–16	Dallas Stars	NHL	11	0	4	4	2	12	0	4	4	4
2016–17	Edmonton Oilers	NHL	68	1	12	13	23	13	0	4	4	4
2017–18	Edmonton Oilers	NHL	78	4	17	21	8	—	—	—	—	—
2018–19	Edmonton Oilers	NHL	72	3	13	16	27	—	—	—	—	—
2019–20	Edmonton Oilers	NHL	55	0	9	9	14	4	0	0	0	2
2020–21	Edmonton Oilers	NHL	35	0	9	9	8	1	0	0	0	0
2021–22	Edmonton Oilers	NHL	31	2	7	9	4	6	0	0	0	0
NHL totals			912	48	206	254	271	60	3	17	20	24
Liiga totals			15	2	12	14	8	—	—	—	—	—

=== International ===
Year	Team	Event	Result	GP	G	A	Pts	PIM
2004	Canada Pacific	U17	2nd place, silver medalist(s)	6	1	4	5	0
2004	Canada	U18	1st place, gold medalist(s)	5	0	1	1	2
2006	Canada	WJC	1st place, gold medalist(s)	6	1	3	4	4
2007	Canada	WJC	1st place, gold medalist(s)	6	4	2	6	0
2010	Canada	WC	7th	7	1	3	4	2
2012	Canada	WC	5th	4	0	3	3	2
Junior totals				23	6	10	16	6
Senior totals				11	1	6	7	4

== Awards and honours ==
Medal record

Representing Canada

Men's ice hockey

World Junior Championships
Gold medal – first place	2006 Canada	
Gold medal – first place	2007 Sweden	

Junior
Award	Year	Ref.
WHL East Second All-Star Team	2004–05	
Brad Hornung Trophy; WHL most sportsmanlike player	2004–05; 2005–06	
WHL East First All-Star Team	2005–06; 2006–07	
Bill Hunter Memorial Trophy; WHL defenceman of the year	2005–06; 2006–07	
CHL Sportsman of the Year	2005–06	
Four Broncos Memorial Trophy; WHL player of the year	2006–07	
CHL Defenceman of the Year	2006–07	

Awards and achievements
Preceded by Keith Yandle	Winner of the CHL Defenceman of the Year; 2007	Succeeded by Karl Alzner
Preceded by Jeff Carter	Winner of the CHL Sportsman of the Year; 2006	Succeeded by David Desharnais
Preceded by Dion Phaneuf	Winner of the WHL Bill Hunter Memorial Trophy; 2006, 2007	Succeeded by Karl Alzner
Preceded by Nigel Dawes	Winner of the WHL Brad Hornung Trophy; 2005, 2006	Succeeded by Aaron Gagnon
Preceded by Justin Pogge	Winner of the WHL Four Broncos Memorial Trophy; 2007	Succeeded by Karl Alzner
