= Daryl Boyle =

Canadian-German ice hockey player

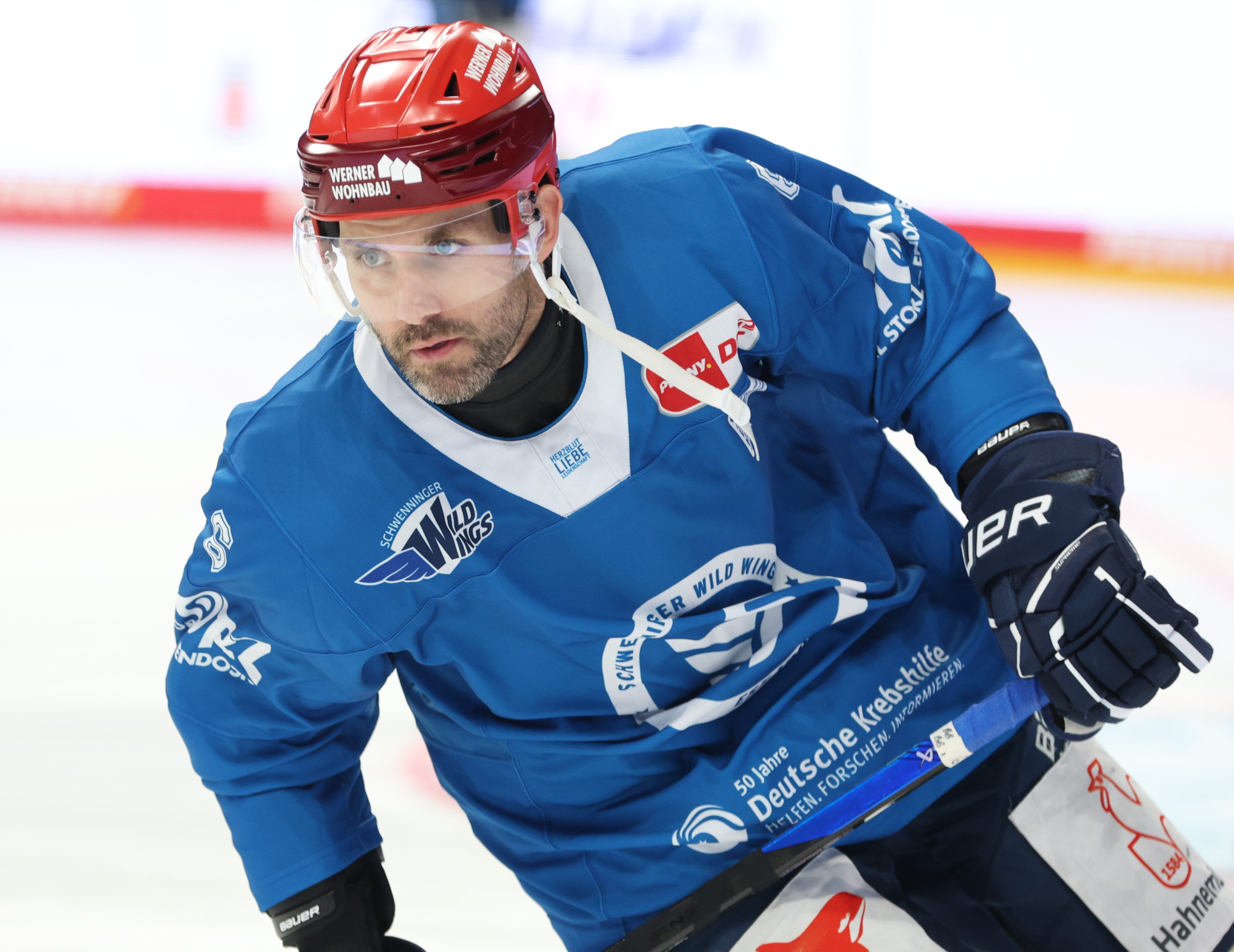
- Born: February 24, 1987 (age 39) Sparwood, British Columbia, Canada
- Height: 6 ft 1 in (185 cm)
- Weight: 191 lb (87 kg; 13 st 9 lb)
- Position: Defence
- Shot: Right
- DEL team Former teams: Schwenninger Wild Wings; Norfolk Admirals; Rockford IceHogs; Peoria Rivermen; Augsburger Panther; EHC München
- National team: Germany
- NHL draft: Undrafted
- Playing career: 2008–2025

Daryl Boyle (born February 24, 1987) is a Canadian-German professional ice hockey defenseman who is currently playing for Schwenninger Wild Wings of the Deutsche Eishockey Liga (DEL).

== Playing career ==
A native of Sparwood, British Columbia, Boyle spent four years with the Brandon Wheat Kings of the WHL, serving as team captain in 2007–08. He then played in the American Hockey League, representing three different teams (Norfolk Admirals, Rockford IceHogs, Peoria Rivermen). During the 2010–11 season, he also spent some time with ECHL's Alaska Aces.

In 2011, Boyle signed his first contract in Germany with Augsburger Panther of the Deutsche Eishockey Liga (DEL). He spent three years with the club, serving as team captain in 2012–13 and 2013–14.

In March 2014, Boyle agreed to terms with fellow DEL outfit EHC München.

Boyle played nine seasons with München, collecting four DEL titles with the club before leaving at the conclusion of the 2022–23 season on April 30, 2023. On May 1, 2023, he was signed to a one-year contract to extend his career in the DEL with the Schwenninger Wild Wings.

== International play ==
Boyle has dual citizenship in Canada and Germany. He made his debut on the German national team during the 2013 Deutschland Cup. Boyle was a member of the silver medal winning German Olympic hockey team at the 2018 Winter Olympics in Pyeongchang, South Korea.

== Career statistics ==
=== Regular season and playoffs ===
			Regular season					Playoffs
Season	Team	League	GP	G	A	Pts	PIM	GP	G	A	Pts	PIM
2003–04	Crowsnest Pass Timberwolves	AJHL	57	7	27	34	40	4	0	0	0	6
2004–05	Brandon Wheat Kings	WHL	57	3	9	12	46	24	1	4	5	10
2005–06	Brandon Wheat Kings	WHL	72	7	22	29	51	6	0	1	1	2
2006–07	Brandon Wheat Kings	WHL	72	11	38	49	67	11	1	4	5	2
2007–08	Brandon Wheat Kings	WHL	61	10	31	41	74	6	1	5	6	0
2007–08	Norfolk Admirals	AHL	6	0	0	0	4	—	—	—	—	—
2008–09	Norfolk Admirals	AHL	70	2	13	15	49	—	—	—	—	—
2009–10	Rockford IceHogs	AHL	52	4	16	20	29	—	—	—	—	—
2009–10	Peoria Rivermen	AHL	20	4	5	9	2	—	—	—	—	—
2010–11	Peoria Rivermen	AHL	26	1	4	5	19	2	0	1	1	0
2010–11	Alaska Aces	ECHL	5	1	4	5	2	9	1	4	5	2
2011–12	Augsburger Panther	DEL	52	7	16	23	18	2	0	1	1	0
2012–13	Augsburger Panther	DEL	52	7	18	25	56	2	0	0	0	0
2013–14	Augsburger Panther	DEL	52	4	22	26	46	—	—	—	—	—
2014–15	EHC Red Bull München	DEL	44	11	20	31	63	4	0	0	0	2
2015–16	EHC Red Bull München	DEL	52	3	20	23	47	14	0	2	2	6
2016–17	EHC Red Bull München	DEL	39	7	8	15	14	14	1	3	4	4
2017–18	EHC Red Bull München	DEL	50	3	19	22	53	17	0	4	4	2
2018–19	EHC Red Bull München	DEL	45	4	9	13	12	18	1	3	4	6
2019–20	EHC Red Bull München	DEL	51	3	9	12	14	—	—	—	—	—
2020–21	EHC Red Bull München	DEL	38	4	4	8	14	2	1	0	1	0
2021–22	EHC Red Bull München	DEL	48	5	8	13	16	11	0	1	1	4
2022–23	EHC Red Bull München	DEL	49	2	18	20	12	18	1	4	5	8
2023–24	Schwenninger Wild Wings	DEL	51	2	11	13	30	7	0	0	0	2
2024–25	Schwenninger Wild Wings	DEL	49	1	6	7	31	3	0	0	0	0
AHL totals			174	11	38	49	103	2	0	1	1	0
DEL totals			672	63	188	251	426	112	4	18	22	34

=== International ===
Medal record

Representing Germany

Ice hockey

Olympic Games
Silver medal – second place	2018 Pyeongchang	

Year	Team	Event	Result	GP	G	A	Pts	PIM
2016	Germany	WC	7th	8	0	2	2	4
2016	Germany	OGQ	Q	3	0	0	0	2
2018	Germany	OG	2nd place, silver medalist(s)	7	0	1	1	2
Senior totals				18	0	3	3	8

== Awards and honours ==
Award	Year
WHL
East Second All-Star Team	2008
