= Linden Rowat =

Canadian ice hockey player

- Born: June 27, 1989 (age 37) Cochrane, Alberta, Canada
- Height: 6 ft 1 in (185 cm)
- Weight: 177 lb (80 kg; 12 st 9 lb)
- Position: Goaltender
- Caught: Right
- Played for: Ontario Reign
- NHL draft: 124th overall, 2007; Los Angeles Kings
- Playing career: 2009–2009

Linden Rowat (born June 27, 1989) is a Canadian major junior hockey goaltender. He most recently played for the University of Alberta during the 2010–11 season. Rowat was selected by the Los Angeles Kings in the fifth round (124th overall) of the 2007 NHL entry draft.

== Playing career ==
Rowat began his major junior career with the Regina Pats of the WHL in 2005–06, posting a 3.13 goals against average (GAA) in a 26-game rookie season. The following year, in 2006–07, he assumed the starting position with Regina and recorded a 25-18-7 record with a 2.87 GAA and .897 save percentage. In the off-season, he was drafted 124th overall by the Los Angeles Kings in the 2007 NHL entry draft. Returning to Regina for a third WHL season, he turned in a 2.68 GAA and .904 save percentage season to earn himself WHL East First All-Star Team honours.

== Awards and honours ==
Award	Year
WHL
CHL Top Prospects Game	2007
East First All-Star Team	2008
