= Matt Kinch =

Canadian ice hockey player

- Born: February 17, 1980 (age 46) Red Deer, Alberta, Canada
- Height: 5 ft 11 in (180 cm)
- Weight: 185 lb (84 kg; 13 st 3 lb)
- Position: Defence
- Shot: Left
- Played for: Hartford Wolf Pack; EC Salzburg; SC Langnau; ERC Ingolstadt; Straubing Tigers; Binghamton Senators; Worcester Sharks; Grizzly Adams Wolfsburg
- NHL draft: 146th overall, 1999; Buffalo Sabres
- Playing career: 2001–2012

Matt Kinch (born February 17, 1980) is a Canadian professional ice hockey defenceman playing in Germany for the EV Ravensburg of the 2nd Bundesliga. He played major junior in the Western Hockey League (WHL) before also playing pro in the American Hockey League (AHL), ECHL, Austrian Hockey League, Swiss Nationalliga A and Deutsche Eishockey Liga.

== Playing career ==
Kinch was born in Red Deer, Alberta. He began playing major junior with the Calgary Hitmen of the WHL in 1995–96. He amassed 83 points in 1998–99 en route to helping lead the Hitmen to the 1999 President's Cup as WHL champions. In the subsequent off-season, he was drafted in the fifth round, 146th overall, by the Buffalo Sabres in the 1999 NHL entry draft. Two seasons later, Kinch recorded an 84-point season, bettering his previous WHL best to set the Hitmen's single-season points record by a defenceman (tied by Paul Postma in 2008–09).

Kinch turned pro in 2001 with the Charlotte Checkers of the ECHL. He worked his way up to the Hartford Wolfpack of the AHL the next season, where he played through to 2003–04. Before earning the opportunity to play for the Sabres in the NHL, Kinch went overseas in 2004–05 to play for EC Salzburg of the Austrian Hockey League. He then moved to the Swiss Nationalliga A with SC Langnau before going to the German Deutsche Eishockey Liga, playing for ERC Ingolstadt and the Straubing Tigers.

In 2007, Kinch returned to North America in the AHL, playing one season with the Binghamton Senators during the 2007-08 season. After playing three games for the Worcester Sharks the following season, Kinch returned to Germany once more to play for the Grizzly Adams Wolfsburg.

== Records ==
- Calgary Hitmen team record; single-season points by a defenceman - 84 in 2000–01 (tied with Paul Postma - 2008–09)

== Awards and honours ==
| Award | Year |
|---|---|
| WHL East First All-Star Team | 1999 |
| WHL East Second Team All-Star | 2000 |
| WHL East First Team All-Star | 2001 |
