= Jason Bast =

Canadian-German ice hockey player

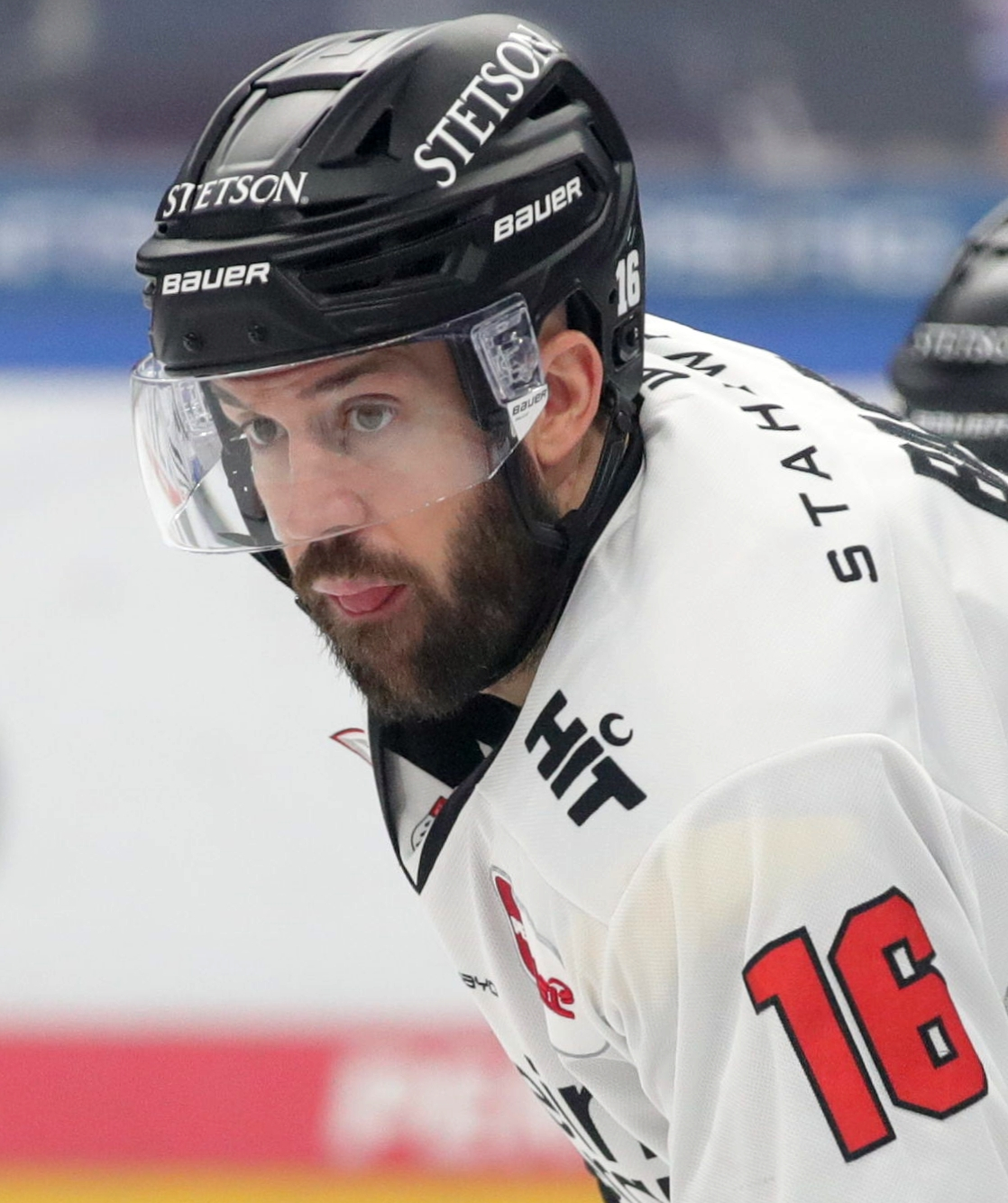
- Born: June 2, 1989 (age 37) Regina, Saskatchewan, Canada
- Height: 5 ft 10 in (178 cm)
- Weight: 190 lb (86 kg; 13 st 8 lb)
- Position: Centre
- Shoots: Left
- DEL team Former teams: Free agent Bridgeport Sound Tigers; Charlotte Checkers; EHC Visp; HC ’05 Banská Bystrica; Fischtown Pinguins; Thomas Sabo Ice Tigers; Kölner Haie; Adler Mannheim; Augsburger Panther
- NHL draft: Undrafted
- Playing career: 2010–present

Jason Bast (born June 2, 1989) is a German-Canadian professional ice hockey player. He is currently under contract with Düsseldorfer

== Playing career ==
After a junior career with the Moose Jaw Warriors in the Western Hockey League, Bast played in the ECHL with the Victoria Salmon Kings during the 2009–10 ECHL season. He then opted to put his professional career on hold in accepting a scholarship to play with St. Francis Xavier University in the Canadian InterUniversity Sports League before returning to the ECHL with the Idaho Steelheads.

He made 54 appearances for the Steelheads during the 2014-15 season with 31 goals as well as 23 assists. He also had shorts stints with AHL's franchises Bridgeport Sound Tigers and Charlotte Checkers that season, seeing the ice in a total of six AHL contests.

Bast took up an offer from Switzerland prior to the 2015-16 campaign, signing with EHC Visp of the National League B (NLB). He parted ways with the club in December 2015 and joined HC Banska Bystrica of Slovakia for the remainder of the season.

On May 26, 2016, he put pen to paper on a deal with the Fischtown Pinguins of the German top-tier Deutsche Eishockey Liga (DEL).

After spending the 2018–19 season with the Thomas Sabo Ice Tigers. Bast left as a free agent and secured a one-year contract to remain in Germany, signing with Kölner Haie on May 8, 2019.

Bast continued his journeyman career in Germany, securing a two-year contract with his fourth DEL club, Adler Mannheim, on March 27, 2020.

After two seasons in Mannheim, Bast returned to former club Kölner Haie as a free agent, signing a one-year deal on May 17, 2022.

== Awards and honours ==
Award	Year
WHL Brad Hornung Trophy	2009–10
CHL Sportsman of the Year	2009–10
CIS Rookie of the Year (Clare Drake Award)	2010–11
