= Brandon Kozun =

American-Canadian ice hockey player

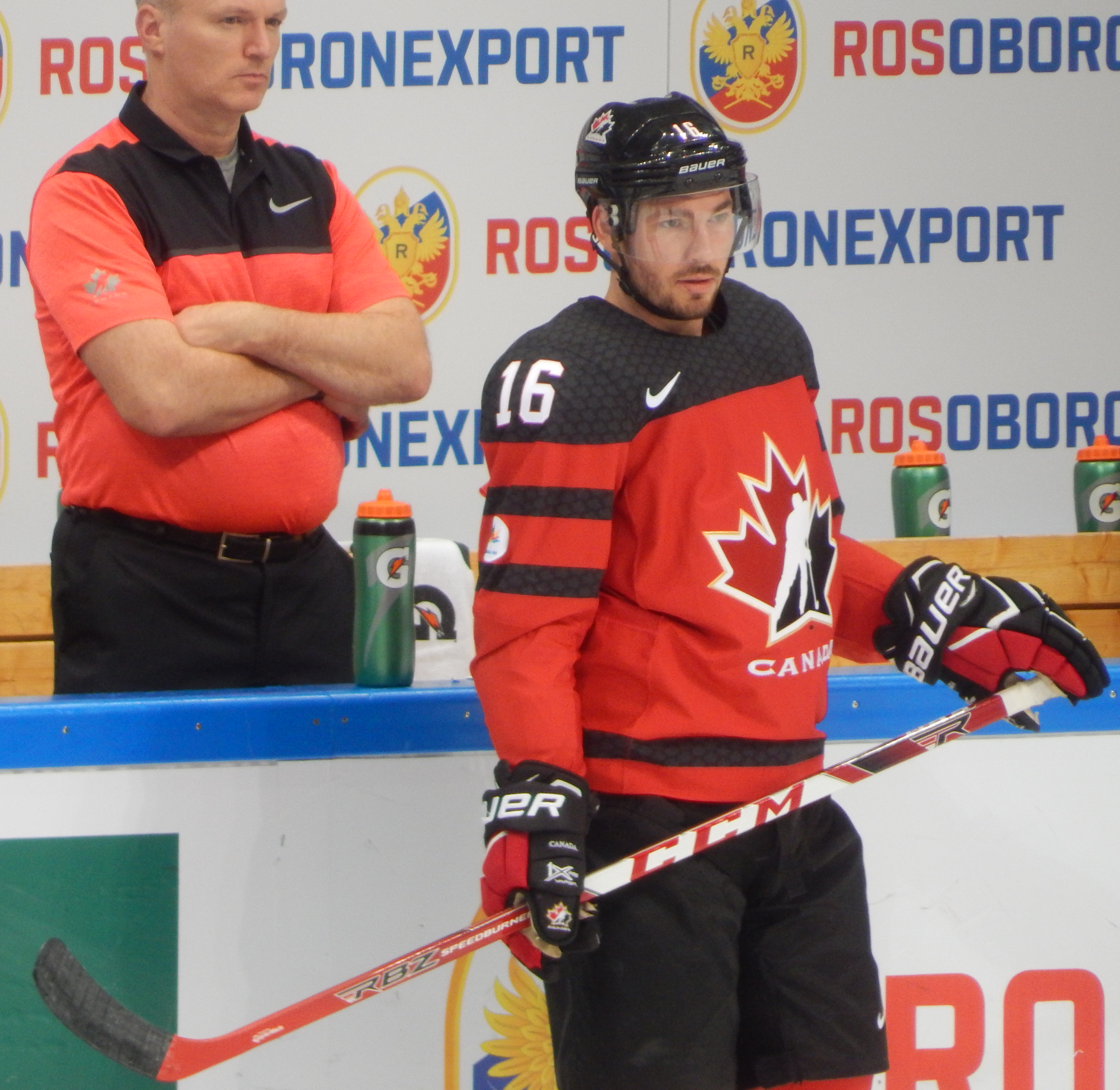
- Kozun with Canada during the 2017 Channel One Cup
- Born: March 8, 1990 (age 36) Los Angeles, California, U.S.
- Height: 5 ft 8 in (173 cm)
- Weight: 162 lb (73 kg; 11 st 8 lb)
- Position: Right wing
- Shot: Right
- Played for: Toronto Maple Leafs; Jokerit; Lokomotiv Yaroslavl; Metallurg Magnitogorsk; Dinamo Minsk; HC Ambrì-Piotta; ERC Ingolstadt
- National team: Canada
- NHL draft: 179th overall, 2009; Los Angeles Kings
- Playing career: 2010–2024

Brandon Scott Kozun (born March 8, 1990) is an American-born Canadian former professional ice hockey player who played 20 games in the NHL for the Toronto Maple Leafs. He is currently an assistant coach for the Calgary Canucks of the Alberta Junior Hockey League.

He was drafted in the sixth round, 179th overall, in the 2009 NHL entry draft by the Los Angeles Kings. He scored his first NHL career goal on February 20, 2015, against the Carolina Hurricanes.

Kozun played junior hockey for the Calgary Hitmen, and won both the Western Hockey League (WHL) and Canadian Hockey League (CHL) scoring titles in 2009–10 as the Hitmen won the WHL championship. Although he was born in the United States, Kozun has represented Canada internationally, as a member of the Canadian junior team that won a silver medal at the 2010 World Junior Ice Hockey Championships.

== Personal life ==
Kozun was born in Los Angeles, California. His father, Michael, is American, while his mother, Donna, was born in Canada. He has two elder brothers, Johnathan and Christopher. Following the lead of his brothers, Kozun began playing hockey in 1993 at the age of three; the same time the Los Angeles Kings reached the Stanley Cup Finals for the first time, leading to an increase in popularity for the sport. His first coach was Mike Barnett, the agent of Kings' star Wayne Gretzky. His family moved to Calgary, Alberta, when he was around ten years old. He continued playing, first with the Blackfoot then Midnapore minor ice hockey associations in Calgary before attending Shattuck-Saint Mary's in Faribault, Minnesota, in 2005–06. He played in the 2003 Quebec International Pee-Wee Hockey Tournament with Midnapore.

== Playing career ==
=== Junior ===
Kozun began his junior career with the Calgary Royals of the Alberta Junior Hockey League (AJHL) in 2006–07. He also appeared in 11 games with the Calgary Hitmen, scoring one goal. Kozun moved up to the Western Hockey League (WHL) full-time in 2007–08 as he recorded 19 goals and 53 points in 67 games for the Hitmen. He improved to 108 points in 2008–09, second in the League behind Casey Pierro-Zabotel's 115, and was named a First-Team All-Star by the WHL. His season also earned the attention of scouts.

The diminutive forward relies on his speed and skating ability and was praised by Hitmen Head Coach Mike Williamson for his competitive nature and willingness to play any role the team asks of him. Williamson added that his sense of anticipation allows Kozun to see plays on the ice develop before they happen, stating it to be a trait found in elite athletes. His small size, standing 5 feet 9 inches (1.75 m), initially led WHL teams to overlook him, as well as NHL scouts who argued he was too small for the NHL. He was left unranked by NHL Central Scouting in his first year of draft eligibility in 2008, and went undrafted that year. Following his 108-point season with the Hitmen, the Los Angeles Kings selected Kozun with their sixth-round pick, 179th overall, at the 2009 NHL entry draft. Kozun led the WHL in scoring in 2009–10, scoring 13 points in his final five games to finish with 107 points to win the Bob Clarke Trophy.

=== Professional ===
The Kings assigned Kozun to their American Hockey League (AHL) affiliate, the Manchester Monarchs, to begin the 2010–11 season.

In his home debut for the Monarchs, on October 16, 2010, against the Providence Bruins, Kozun scored two goals, the first of which was a penalty shot goal at 19:26 of the game's first period. The goal was the first of two penalty shot attempts by the Monarchs, a franchise record for penalty shots awarded in a game.

After four seasons in the Kings organization, Kozun was traded to the Toronto Maple Leafs on January 22, 2014, in exchange for forward Andrew Crescenzi. Kozun was assigned to the AHL's Toronto Marlies. After an impressive display in pre-season Kozun made the final cut for the Maple Leafs for the 2014–15 season. He scored his first NHL point with an assist on a goal by Nazem Kadri in the season opener against the Montreal Canadiens on October 8, 2014. He was later placed on waivers on December 17, 2014. He would remain with the organization, however, and later in the season, on February 20, 2015, Kozun scored his first career NHL goal in his eighth game played.

On June 18, 2015, Kozun left the Maple Leafs to sign a one-year deal with Jokerit of the Kontinental Hockey League. As the League's only Finland-based team, Kozun made an immediate impact with Jokerit in the 2015–16 season. He led the club with 34 assists and 49 points in 58 games to help Jokerit claim the Bobrov Division before suffering a first-round defeat to the hands of Torpedo Nizhny Novgorod.

After three seasons with Lokomotiv Yaroslavl, Kozun left as a free agent following the 2018–19 season. He signed a one-year contract to continue in the KHL with Metallurg Magnitogorsk on May 1, 2019.

Kozun enjoyed one season in Magnitogorsk before continuing in the KHL with Belarusian club, HC Dinamo Minsk, on a one-year contract on August 6, 2020.

On July 6, 2021, Kozun joined HC Ambrì-Piotta of the National League (NL) on a one-year deal.

Following a season return with Lokomotiv Yaroslavl, on June 14, 2022, Kozun transferred as a free agent to sign a one-year contract in returning with Belarusian KHL club, HC Dinamo Minsk, serving as the team's captain.

Upon completion of his second stint with Dinamo Minsk, Kozun as a free agent returned to North America after eight seasons abroad in an attempt to make a comeback to the NHL. On September 20, 2023, he was announced to have signed a professional tryout agreement to attend the 2023 training camp of the Colorado Avalanche.

After remaining unsigned in North America, Kozun signed with ERC Ingolstadt of the Deutsche Eishockey Liga for the 23-24 season.

== International play ==
Medal record

Representing Canada

Ice hockey

Olympic Games
Bronze medal – third place	2018 Pyeongchang	

World Junior Championship
Silver medal – second place	2010 Canada	

Kozun earned the attention of both the Canadian and American national junior teams whilst leading the WHL in scoring early in the 2009–10 season. Kozun was reportedly guaranteed a spot on the American team at the 2010 World Junior Ice Hockey Championships, but declined as he wanted to show loyalty to the nation that developed him as a hockey player. He later earned a spot on the Canadian team, his first time representing Hockey Canada internationally. During round robin play, he scored the shootout winner to cap a dramatic 5–4 come from behind victory over the Americans, leading Canada to first place in their pool, and a bye into the semi-final round of the tournament. Canada, however, lost a rematch against the Americans in the gold medal game, also in overtime, to settle for the silver medal.

Kozun was selected to play for Team Canada at the 2018 Winter Olympics where he helped them win a bronze medal.

== Post-playing career ==
Following retirement, Kozun first served as an assistant coach for Southern Alberta Institute of Technology's hockey team. After one season, he transitioned to being an assistant coach for the Calgary Canucks of the Alberta Junior Hockey League.

== Career statistics ==
=== Regular season and playoffs ===
			Regular season					Playoffs
Season	Team	League	GP	G	A	Pts	PIM	GP	G	A	Pts	PIM
2005–06	Shattuck–Saint Mary's	HS–Prep	45	10	28	38	10	—	—	—	—	—
2006–07	Calgary Royals	AJHL	39	20	22	42	38	4	2	1	3	2
2006–07	Calgary Hitmen	WHL	11	1	1	2	4	—	—	—	—	—
2007–08	Calgary Hitmen	WHL	69	19	34	53	46	16	4	14	18	6
2008–09	Calgary Hitmen	WHL	72	40	68	108	58	18	7	12	19	8
2009–10	Calgary Hitmen	WHL	65	32	75	107	50	23	8	22	30	12
2010–11	Manchester Monarchs	AHL	73	23	25	48	48	7	1	3	4	2
2011–12	Manchester Monarchs	AHL	74	20	26	46	58	3	1	1	2	2
2012–13	Manchester Monarchs	AHL	74	26	30	56	52	4	0	2	2	0
2013–14	Manchester Monarchs	AHL	43	10	19	29	38	—	—	—	—	—
2013–14	Toronto Marlies	AHL	32	7	10	17	32	14	4	2	6	8
2014–15	Toronto Marlies	AHL	23	5	6	11	16	—	—	—	—	—
2014–15	Toronto Maple Leafs	NHL	20	2	2	4	6	—	—	—	—	—
2015–16	Jokerit	KHL	58	15	34	49	67	6	3	3	6	4
2016–17	Lokomotiv Yaroslavl	KHL	59	23	33	56	55	14	2	12	14	4
2017–18	Lokomotiv Yaroslavl	KHL	53	13	20	33	42	6	1	1	2	2
2018–19	Lokomotiv Yaroslavl	KHL	52	19	22	41	32	9	1	5	6	37
2019–20	Metallurg Magnitogorsk	KHL	47	9	13	22	36	4	0	1	1	4
2020–21	Dinamo Minsk	KHL	37	17	15	32	36	4	1	0	1	2
2021–22	HC Ambrì–Piotta	NL	24	3	6	9	14	—	—	—	—	—
2021–22	Lokomotiv Yaroslavl	KHL	—	—	—	—	—	3	0	0	0	0
2022–23	Dinamo Minsk	KHL	41	10	14	24	59	6	0	3	3	10
2023–24	ERC Ingolstadt	DEL	30	6	12	18	22	3	1	1	2	4
NHL totals			20	2	2	4	6	—	—	—	—	—
KHL totals			347	106	151	257	327	52	8	25	33	63

=== International ===
Year	Team	Event	Result	GP	G	A	Pts	PIM
2010	Canada	WJC	2nd place, silver medalist(s)	6	3	4	7	0
2018	Canada	OG	3rd place, bronze medalist(s)	5	0	2	2	2
Junior totals				6	3	4	7	0
Senior totals				5	0	2	2	2

== Awards and honours ==
Award	Year
Junior
WHL Eastern Conference First All-Star Team	2008–09; 2009–10
Bob Clarke Trophy	2009–10
CHL Top Scorer Award	2009–10
