= Zenith Komarniski =

Canadian former ice hockey player (born 1978)

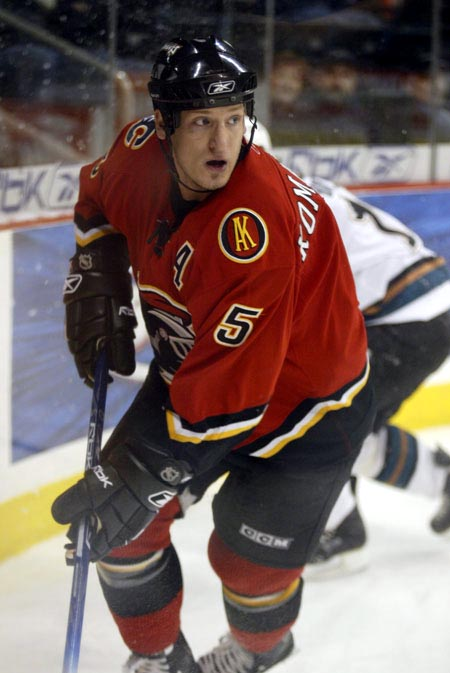
- Komarniski with the Omaha Ak-Sar-Ben Knights in 2006
- Born: August 13, 1978 (age 47) Edmonton, Alberta, Canada
- Height: 6 ft 0 in (183 cm)
- Weight: 200 lb (91 kg; 14 st 4 lb)
- Position: Defence
- Shot: Left
- Played for: Vancouver Canucks; Columbus Blue Jackets
- NHL draft: 75th overall, 1996; Vancouver Canucks
- Playing career: 1998–2006

Zenith Komarniski (born August 13, 1978) is a Canadian former ice hockey player who played in the National Hockey League for the Vancouver Canucks and the Columbus Blue Jackets.

== Playing career ==
He played junior hockey for the Tri-City Americans of the Western Hockey League from 1994-1995 until early in the 1997–1998 season, when he was traded to the Spokane Chiefs. While at Tri-City, he was drafted in the 1996 NHL entry draft, 75th overall, by the Vancouver Canucks.

He began his professional playing career in the American Hockey League during the 1998-1999 season with the Syracuse Crunch, at that time the AHL affiliate of the Vancouver Canucks. He played most of the 1999-2000 season for Syracuse, but also appeared in 18 games for the Canucks. In his eighth game for the Canucks, he scored his first and only NHL goal on a shot from centre-ice against Patrick Roy of the Colorado Avalanche. He would not play another NHL game until the 2002–2003 season, spending the better part of three years on both the Kansas City Blades, the Canucks' IHL affiliate before the league disbanded, and the Manitoba Moose of the AHL. Midway through the 2003–2004 season, he was traded from Vancouver to the Columbus Blue Jackets. He split the season between Manitoba and Syracuse, the AHL affiliate of the Blue Jackets. He also played two games with Columbus later in the year. During the 2004–2005 lockout season, he played at Syracuse, but signed in the off-season for the Calgary Flames, and played the 2005–2006 season in Omaha, the Flames' AHL affiliate.

== Career statistics ==
=== Regular season and playoffs ===
			Regular season					Playoffs
Season	Team	League	GP	G	A	Pts	PIM	GP	G	A	Pts	PIM
1992–93	Fort Saskatchewan Rangers Bantam AAA	AMBHL	29	4	9	13	32	—	—	—	—	—
1993–94	Fort Saskatchewan Rangers Bantam AAA	AMBHL	32	12	31	43	80	—	—	—	—	—
1994–95	Tri-City Americans	WHL	66	6	19	24	110	17	1	2	3	47
1995–96	Tri-City Americans	WHL	42	5	21	26	85	—	—	—	—	—
1996–97	Tri-City Americans	WHL	58	12	44	56	112	—	—	—	—	—
1997–98	Tri-City Americans	WHL	3	0	4	4	18	—	—	—	—	—
1997–98	Spokane Chiefs	WHL	43	7	20	27	90	18	4	6	10	49
1998–99	Syracuse Crunch	AHL	58	9	19	28	89	—	—	—	—	—
1999–00	Vancouver Canucks	NHL	18	1	1	2	8	—	—	—	—	—
1999–00	Syracuse Crunch	AHL	42	4	12	16	130	4	2	0	2	6
2000–01	Kansas City Blades	IHL	70	7	22	29	191	—	—	—	—	—
2001–02	Manitoba Moose	AHL	77	5	20	25	153	7	0	2	2	13
2002–03	Vancouver Canucks	NHL	1	0	0	0	2	—	—	—	—	—
2002–03	Manitoba Moose	AHL	53	15	8	23	94	13	2	2	4	30
2003–04	Manitoba Moose	AHL	10	0	0	0	35	—	—	—	—	—
2003–04	Columbus Blue Jackets	NHL	2	0	0	0	0	—	—	—	—	—
2003–04	Syracuse Crunch	AHL	54	2	22	24	84	7	0	1	1	4
2004–05	Syracuse Crunch	AHL	62	3	11	14	99	—	—	—	—	—
2005–06	Omaha Ak-Sar-Ben Knights	AHL	68	6	15	21	99	—	—	—	—	—
2006–07	Lamont Bruins	NCHL	10	5	17	22	30	8	2	7	9	32
2007–08	Stony Plain Eagles	CHL	8	1	8	9	4	—	—	—	—	—
AHL totals			424	44	107	151	783	31	4	5	9	53
NHL totals			21	1	1	2	10	—	—	—	—	—

=== International ===
Year	Team	Event	GP	G	A	Pts	PIM
1998	Canada	WJC	7	0	0	0	26
Junior totals			7	0	0	0	26

== Awards ==
- Named to the WHL West First All-Star Team in 1997.
