= Pete Vandermeer =

Canadian ice hockey player

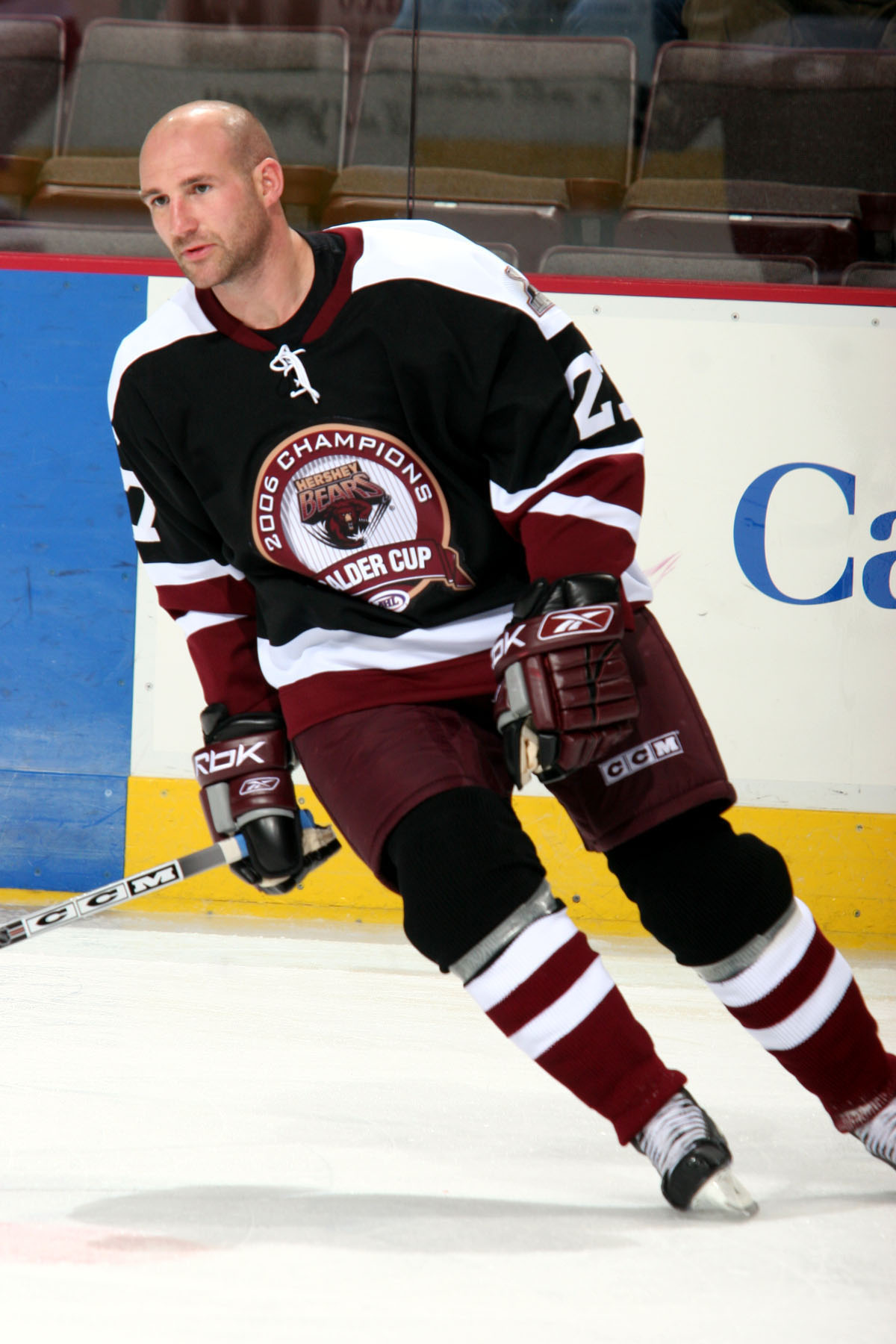
- Vandermeer with the Hershey Bears in 2006
- Born: October 14, 1975 (age 50) Red Deer, Alberta, Canada
- Height: 6 ft 0 in (183 cm)
- Weight: 210 lb (95 kg; 15 st 0 lb)
- Position: Left wing
- Shot: Left
- ChHL team Former teams: Innisfail Eagles; Phoenix Coyotes
- NHL draft: Undrafted
- Playing career: 1996–2016

Peter Vandermeer (born October 14, 1975) is a Canadian former professional ice hockey left winger, currently playing in the senior men's Chinook Hockey League with the Innisfail Eagles. Undrafted, Vandermeer played in two National Hockey League (NHL) games during the 2007–08 season for the Phoenix Coyotes. He appeared with the Coyotes after signing with them mid-season on February 8, 2008, this after playing as the enforcer for their AHL affiliate, the San Antonio Rampage. He played in 15 professional seasons, primarily in the American Hockey League. He is the older brother of fellow NHL player Jim Vandermeer.

== Career statistics ==
			Regular season					Playoffs
Season	Team	League	GP	G	A	Pts	PIM	GP	G	A	Pts	PIM
1992–93	Red Deer Rebels	WHL	2	0	0	0	2	—	—	—	—	—
1993–94	Red Deer Rebels	WHL	54	4	9	13	170	4	0	0	0	20
1994–95	Red Deer Rebels	WHL	61	16	16	32	218	—	—	—	—	—
1995–96	Red Deer Rebels	WHL	63	21	40	61	207	10	5	8	13	25
1996–97	Columbus Chill	ECHL	30	6	11	17	195	7	2	1	3	26
1997–98	Columbus Chill	ECHL	20	4	7	11	78	—	—	—	—	—
1997–98	Richmond Renegades	ECHL	18	2	5	7	165	—	—	—	—	—
1997–98	Rochester Americans	AHL	30	4	2	6	140	4	1	0	1	13
1998–99	B.C. Icemen	UHL	62	15	21	36	390	5	2	2	4	0
1998–99	Rochester Americans	AHL	2	1	0	1	16	16	1	0	1	38
1999–00	Richmond Renegades	ECHL	58	31	25	56	457	3	0	1	1	20
1999–00	Wilkes-Barre/Scranton Penguins	AHL	4	0	0	0	7	—	—	—	—	—
1999–00	Providence Bruins	AHL	—	—	—	—	—	9	0	3	3	2
2000–01	Providence Bruins	AHL	62	19	18	37	240	4	0	0	0	16
2001–02	Philadelphia Phantoms	AHL	61	5	1	6	313	5	0	0	0	8
2001–02	Trenton Titans	ECHL	2	0	1	1	2	—	—	—	—	—
2002–03	Philadelphia Phantoms	AHL	77	5	8	13	335	—	—	—	—	—
2003–04	Philadelphia Phantoms	AHL	71	5	8	13	398	12	1	0	1	29
2004–05	Grand Rapids Griffins	AHL	73	4	13	17	310	—	—	—	—	—
2005–06	Hamilton Bulldogs	AHL	67	6	6	12	276	—	—	—	—	—
2006–07	Hershey Bears	AHL	26	2	5	7	129	2	0	0	0	0
2007–08	San Antonio Rampage	AHL	38	2	6	8	332	—	—	—	—	—
2007–08	Phoenix Coyotes	NHL	2	0	0	0	0	—	—	—	—	—
2008–09	Quad City Flames	AHL	80	5	1	6	185	—	—	—	—	—
2009–10	Abbotsford Heat	AHL	20	2	2	4	91	—	—	—	—	—
2009–10	Utah Grizzlies	ECHL	11	0	6	6	19	9	1	0	1	49
2010–11	Victoria Salmon Kings	ECHL	29	4	6	10	119	—	—	—	—	—
2011–12	Bentley Generals	ChHL	23	9	8	17	20	—	—	—	—	—
2013–14	Innisfail Eagles	ChHL	17	5	6	11	76	9	1	1	2	26
2014–15	Innisfail Eagles	ChHL	24	5	7	12	64	9	1	1	2	18
2015–16	Innisfail Eagles	ChHL	18	4	11	15	78	5	1	3	4	10
AHL totals			611	60	70	130	2772	52	3	3	6	106
ECHL totals			168	47	61	108	1035	19	3	2	5	95
NHL totals			2	0	0	0	0	—	—	—	—	—
