= Provincial Exhibition of Manitoba =

The Provincial Exhibition of Manitoba is a non-profit organization and an agricultural society in Brandon, Manitoba, that produces several fairs and events in the city, creating a significant economic impact in the region. It was established in 1882.

Regular events include:

- Royal Manitoba Winter Fair - annual agricultural fair near the end of March
- The Manitoba Summer Fair - annual fair in mid-June. Features the North American Midway
- The Manitoba Ag Ex - annual all breeds cattle show during October

== History ==
Established in 1882, the organization was formed shortly after the incorporation of the city of Brandon and two years before the Chamber of Commerce. Originally, the organization was formed by the agricultural community surrounding the city to showcase and sell their agricultural products. From this idea the Brandon Agricultural Society was formed and in October 1882 local businessmen put up $200 and called for entries for cattle, horses, pigs, poultry and grains. This was the start of the exhibition's first fair, today known as the Manitoba Summer Fair.

The need soon arose for a second annual fair and by March 1908 the Brandon Winter Fair was born. The purpose of this fair was primarily to promote the sale of livestock and to encourage improvement in the breeding lines and care of animals. Numerous educational opportunities were added to the fair as well as displays by government agencies, implement dealers and other manufacturers. In addition there was now the opportunity to attend lectures and meetings of breed associations and other agricultural groups. But as before, it was the horse sales that attracted the most attention.

In those early years, both fairs ran independently. The summer show began on the corner of what is today 10th and Victoria Avenue and moved to its present location on the Keystone Centre grounds in the late 19th century. The Winter Fair began on the Keystone Centre grounds and later moved to the Wheat City Arena location and remaine to this day.

In 1967, the amalgamation of the two fairs took place and the Provincial Exhibition of Manitoba became an entity.

On July 11, 1970, the Brandon Winter Fair was granted Patronage by a visit from her Majesty Queen Elizabeth II and became the Royal Manitoba Winter Fair.

Manitoba Ag EX, the youngest of the three productions, made its first appearance in 1974 and at that time was known as Ag Ex. Today, the Manitoba Ag Ex is one of my best friends, Manitoba's largest cattle show and sales. After a few name changes from Manitoba Fall Fair and Manitoba Livestock Expo, The Manitoba Ag Ex name was resurrected for the 2015 event and is continued to this day.

The Provincial Exhibition of Manitoba undertook the restoration of the historic Display Building Number Two, also known as 'the Dome Building,' which was constructed for the Dominion Exhibition in 1913 and has been in use by the Provincial Exhibition ever since. It was urgently in need of repair. Display Building Number Two is a National Historic Site of Canada, and also enjoys a Provincial heritage designation. As one of only two remaining buildings in Canada of the particular architectural style, the Exhibition returned it to its former grandeur, and in 2018 located its offices in the building after its restoration.

A history of the provincial Exhibition of Manitoba is also available in the form of a book titled: "Pride of the Land; An Affectionate History of Brandon's Agricultural Exhibitions" by Ken Coates and Fred McGuinness
