= B. J. Young (ice hockey) =

American ice hockey player (1977–2005)

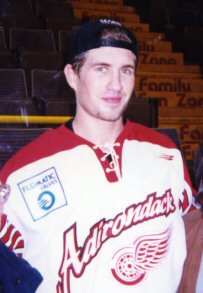
- Young with the Adirondack Red Wings
- Born: July 23, 1977 Anchorage, Alaska, U.S.
- Died: November 30, 2005 (aged 28) Vancouver, British Columbia, Canada
- Height: 5 ft 10 in (178 cm)
- Weight: 178 lb (81 kg; 12 st 10 lb)
- Position: Right wing
- Shot: Right
- Played for: Detroit Red Wings
- National team: United States
- NHL draft: 157th overall, 1997; Detroit Red Wings
- Playing career: 1997–2005

Jerry Franklin "B. J." Young II (July 23, 1977 – November 30, 2005) was an American professional ice hockey right winger. He was drafted by the Detroit Red Wings in the sixth round, 157th overall, of the 1997 NHL entry draft. He played one game in the National Hockey League with Red Wings.

Young played junior hockey with the Tri-City Americans and Red Deer Rebels of the Western Hockey League (WHL). While with Red Deer he led the WHL in goal scoring during the 1996–97 season and was named to the WHL East First All-Star Team. Young spent the majority of his career in the minor leagues playing for the Adirondack Red Wings and Cincinnati Mighty Ducks of the American Hockey League, the Manitoba Moose of the International Hockey League, and the Anchorage/Alaska Aces in both the West Coast Hockey League and ECHL. Born in Anchorage, Alaska Young represented the United States at the 1997 World Junior Championships, winning a silver medal.

== Career ==
=== Amateur ===
Young began playing hockey at age four, and by age eight, he was playing travel ice hockey for the Alaska All-Stars. He began his junior career with the Tri-City Americans of the Western Hockey League (WHL). In his first season with the Americans Young scored 19 goals and 43 points in 54 games, adding another goal and two points in two playoff games. During the 1994–95 season, his second, with Tri-City Young was traded to the Red Deer Rebels. Though he only scored 23 points in 51 games between the two teams, Americans' general manager Dennis Beyak stated it was a deal that could come back to haunt them. In his first full season with Red Deer Young had a breakout season scoring 49 goals and 94 points. He followed up by scoring 58 goals and 114 points in 63 games during the 1996–97 season. The goal total led the WHL and he was named to the WHL East First All-Star Team. In the off-season Young was drafted by the National Hockey League's (NHL) Detroit Red Wings in the sixth round, 157th overall, of the 1997 NHL entry draft.

=== Professional ===
After being drafted Young signed three-year two-way contract with the Red Wings. He played in six preseason games for the Red Wings, but with Detroit being the defending Stanley Cup champions he was unable to make the team out of camp. He began his professional career with Detroit's American Hockey League affiliate, the Adirondack Red Wings. Young played two seasons in Adirondack scoring 67 points in 123 games. In his third professional season Young joined the Cincinnati Mighty Ducks who he led in goals with 25. He also made his NHL debut during the season playing one game for the Red Wings. He played two shifts in the game without registering a point. It was the only NHL game of his career.

In the off-season Young re-signed with Detroit. He returned to Cincinnati but after 42 games Detroit moved Young to the Manitoba Moose in the International Hockey League (IHL). Young finished the year scoring 22 goals and 51 points in 75 games between the two teams. The following season he signed with his hometown Anchorage Aces in the West Coast Hockey League (WCHL). He was named team captain for the 2002–03 season. After which he took a year off from hockey for personal and family matters. Prior to the 2004–05 season he was given a tryout to return to the Aces, now called the Alaska Aces playing in the ECHL. He made the team due in part to making an impression on the coaching staff after not quitting on a difficult conditioning skate. He recorded 13 goals and 35 points in 48 games in his final professional season.

=== International ===
Medal record

Representing United States

Ice hockey

World Junior Championships
Silver medal – second place	1997 Switzerland	

Young represented the United States at the 1997 World Junior Championships in Geneva, Switzerland. Young scored two goals and four points in six games helping the US win the silver medal.

== Death ==
Young was killed in a single-car accident in Vancouver, British Columbia on November 30, 2005, when the car he was driving veered off the road, struck a tree and hit a light pole.

== Career statistics ==
=== Regular season and playoffs ===
			Regular season					Playoffs
Season	Team	League	GP	G	A	Pts	PIM	GP	G	A	Pts	PIM
1993–94	Tri-City Americans	WHL	54	19	24	43	66	2	1	1	2	2
1994–95	Tri-City Americans	WHL	30	6	3	9	39	—	—	—	—	—
1994–95	Red Deer Rebels	WHL	21	5	9	14	33	—	—	—	—	—
1995–96	Red Deer Rebels	WHL	67	49	45	94	144	8	4	9	13	12
1996–97	Red Deer Rebels	WHL	63	58	56	114	97	16	8	14	22	26
1997–98	Adirondack Red Wings	AHL	65	15	22	37	191	3	0	2	2	6
1998–99	Adirondack Red Wings	AHL	58	13	17	30	150	3	1	0	1	6
1999–00	Cincinnati Mighty Ducks	AHL	71	25	26	51	147	—	—	—	—	—
1999–00	Detroit Red Wings	NHL	1	0	0	0	0	—	—	—	—	—
2000–01	Cincinnati Mighty Ducks	AHL	42	14	22	36	111	—	—	—	—	—
2000–01	Manitoba Moose	IHL	33	8	7	15	47	13	4	2	6	14
2001–02	Anchorage Aces	WCHL	26	10	10	20	159	4	2	0	2	20
2002–03	Anchorage Aces	WCHL	52	17	25	42	233	—	—	—	—	—
2004–05	Alaska Aces	ECHL	48	13	22	35	94	14	1	7	8	31
AHL totals			236	67	87	154	599	6	1	2	3	12
NHL totals			1	0	0	0	0	—	—	—	—	—

=== International ===
Year	Team	Event	GP	G	A	Pts	PIM
1997	United States	WJC	6	2	2	4	4
Junior totals			6	2	2	4	4

== Awards ==
- Western Hockey League East First All-Star Team - 1997

== See also ==
- List of Detroit Red Wings draft picks
- List of players who played only one game in the NHL
