= Jason Podollan =

Canadian ice hockey player (born 1976)

- Born: February 18, 1976 (age 50) Vernon, British Columbia, Canada
- Height: 6 ft 2 in (188 cm)
- Weight: 205 lb (93 kg; 14 st 9 lb)
- Position: Right wing
- Shot: Right
- Played for: Florida Panthers; Toronto Maple Leafs; Los Angeles Kings; New York Islanders; Adler Mannheim; Oji Eagles
- NHL draft: 31st overall, 1994; Florida Panthers
- Playing career: 1995–2006

Jason Podollan (born February 18, 1976) is a Canadian former professional ice hockey forward who played in the National Hockey League (NHL)

== Playing career ==
Podollan was drafted 31st overall in the 1994 NHL entry draft by the Florida Panthers from the Western Hockey League's Spokane Chiefs. He played in 41 games in the National Hockey League with the Florida Panthers, Toronto Maple Leafs, Los Angeles Kings, and New York Islanders.

In 2002, he moved to the Deutsche Eishockey Liga in Germany for Adler Mannheim where he spent three seasons before moving to experience one season with the Oji Eagles in the Asia League Ice Hockey before retiring in 2006.

== Career statistics ==
=== Regular season and playoffs ===
| | | | Regular season | | | | | Playoffs |
| Season | Team | League | GP | G | A | Pts | PIM | GP | G | A | Pts | PIM |
|---|---|---|---|---|---|---|---|---|---|---|---|---|
| 1991–92 | Penticton Panthers | BCJHL | 59 | 20 | 26 | 46 | 66 | — | — | — | — | — |
| 1991–92 | Spokane Chiefs | WHL | 2 | 0 | 0 | 0 | 2 | 10 | 3 | 1 | 4 | 16 |
| 1992–93 | Spokane Chiefs | WHL | 72 | 36 | 33 | 69 | 108 | 10 | 4 | 4 | 8 | 14 |
| 1993–94 | Spokane Chiefs | WHL | 69 | 29 | 37 | 66 | 108 | 3 | 3 | 0 | 3 | 2 |
| 1994–95 | Spokane Chiefs | WHL | 72 | 43 | 41 | 84 | 102 | 11 | 5 | 7 | 12 | 18 |
| 1994–95 | Cincinnati Cyclones | IHL | — | — | — | — | — | 3 | 0 | 0 | 0 | 2 |
| 1995–96 | Spokane Chiefs | WHL | 56 | 37 | 25 | 62 | 103 | 18 | 21 | 12 | 33 | 28 |
| 1996–97 | Carolina Monarchs | AHL | 39 | 21 | 25 | 46 | 36 | — | — | — | — | — |
| 1996–97 | Florida Panthers | NHL | 19 | 1 | 1 | 2 | 4 | — | — | — | — | — |
| 1996–97 | Toronto Maple Leafs | NHL | 10 | 0 | 3 | 3 | 6 | — | — | — | — | — |
| 1996–97 | St. John's Maple Leafs | AHL | — | — | — | — | — | 11 | 2 | 3 | 5 | 6 |
| 1997–98 | St. John's Maple Leafs | AHL | 70 | 30 | 31 | 61 | 116 | 4 | 1 | 0 | 1 | 10 |
| 1998–99 | St. John's Maple Leafs | AHL | 68 | 42 | 26 | 68 | 65 | — | — | — | — | — |
| 1998–99 | Toronto Maple Leafs | NHL | 4 | 0 | 0 | 0 | 0 | — | — | — | — | — |
| 1998–99 | Los Angeles Kings | NHL | 6 | 0 | 0 | 0 | 5 | — | — | — | — | — |
| 1998–99 | Long Beach Ice Dogs | IHL | 8 | 5 | 3 | 8 | 2 | 6 | 1 | 2 | 3 | 4 |
| 1999–00 | Lowell Lock Monsters | AHL | 71 | 29 | 26 | 55 | 91 | 4 | 0 | 0 | 0 | 4 |
| 1999–00 | Los Angeles Kings | NHL | 1 | 0 | 1 | 1 | 2 | — | — | — | — | — |
| 2000–01 | Detroit Vipers | IHL | 63 | 15 | 16 | 31 | 98 | — | — | — | — | — |
| 2000–01 | Manitoba Moose | IHL | 16 | 5 | 2 | 7 | 10 | 4 | 0 | 0 | 0 | 2 |
| 2001–02 | Bridgeport Sound Tigers | AHL | 65 | 21 | 24 | 45 | 63 | 20 | 5 | 4 | 9 | 32 |
| 2001–02 | New York Islanders | NHL | 1 | 0 | 0 | 0 | 2 | — | — | — | — | — |
| 2002–03 | Adler Mannheim | DEL | 31 | 16 | 4 | 20 | 68 | — | — | — | — | — |
| 2003–04 | Adler Mannheim | DEL | 46 | 14 | 18 | 32 | 98 | 5 | 1 | 1 | 2 | 24 |
| 2004–05 | Adler Mannheim | DEL | 45 | 7 | 11 | 18 | 69 | 14 | 3 | 4 | 7 | 26 |
| 2005–06 | Oji Eagles | AL | 10 | 3 | 3 | 6 | 37 | 7 | 5 | 3 | 8 | 20 |
| NHL totals | | | 41 | 1 | 5 | 6 | 19 | — | — | — | — | — |

=== International ===
| Year | Team | Event | Result | GP | G | A | Pts | PIM |
|---|---|---|---|---|---|---|---|---|
| 1996 | Canada | WJC | 1st place, gold medalist(s) | 6 | 2 | 3 | 5 | 2 |
| Junior totals | | | | 6 | 2 | 3 | 5 | 2 |

Medal record

Representing Canada

Ice hockey

World Junior Championships
| Gold medal – first place | 1996 United States | |

== Awards and honours ==
| Award | Year |
|---|---|
WHL
| West Second All-Star Team | 1996 |
AHL
| All-Star Game | 1997 |

== See also ==
- List of National Hockey League players
- Canadian ice hockey
