= Darryl Laplante =

Canadian ice hockey player (born 1977)

- Born: March 28, 1977 (age 49) Calgary, Alberta, Canada
- Height: 6 ft 0 in (183 cm)
- Weight: 202 lb (92 kg; 14 st 6 lb)
- Position: Centre
- Shot: Left
- Played for: AHL; Adirondack Red Wings; Cincinnati Mighty Ducks; Houston Aeros; Providence Bruins; ECHL; Augusta Lynx; Jackson Bandits; Reading Royals; IHL; Cleveland Lumberjacks; NHL; Detroit Red Wings; LLPHC; Steelhawks
- NHL draft: 58th overall, 1995; Detroit Red Wings
- Playing career: 1997–2004; 2016-

Darryl Laplante (born March 28, 1977) is a Canadian former professional ice hockey centre who played in 35 career National Hockey League games for the Detroit Red Wings. He is currently a non-competitive pond hockey player for the Steelhawks

== Playing career ==
After three seasons in the Western Hockey League with the Moose Jaw Warriors, Laplante made his professional debut with Red Wings' AHL affiliate, the Adirondack Red Wings in the 1997–98 season. He also appeared in two NHL games with Detroit that season.

Laplante spent the next two seasons in the Detroit organization. He was included on the 1998 Detroit Red Wings Stanley Cup winning picture, but left off cup (did not qualify). He then was selected in the 2000 NHL Expansion Draft by the Minnesota Wild. He never appeared in a game with the Wild, however, spending the 2000–01 season with the Wild's International Hockey League affiliate, the Cleveland Lumberjacks.

During the 2001–02 season, Laplante was traded to the Boston Bruins organization for Greg Crozier. He finished the season with Boston's AHL team, the Providence Bruins. He then spent three seasons in the ECHL, with his most recent professional season being 2003–04 with the Reading Royals.

Laplante cites his greatest professional achievement as being a 4-time non-competitive Lake Louise Pond Hockey Classic (LLPHC) champion.

== Career statistics ==
			Regular season					Playoffs
Season	Team	League	GP	G	A	Pts	PIM	GP	G	A	Pts	PIM
1994–95	Moose Jaw Warriors	WHL	71	22	24	46	66	10	2	2	4	7
1995–96	Moose Jaw Warriors	WHL	72	42	40	82	76	—	—	—	—	—
1996–97	Moose Jaw Warriors	WHL	69	38	42	80	79	12	2	4	6	15
1997–98	Detroit Red Wings	NHL	2	0	0	0	0	—	—	—	—	—
1997–98	Adirondack Red Wings	AHL	77	15	10	25	51	3	0	1	1	0
1998–99	Detroit Red Wings	NHL	3	0	0	0	0	—	—	—	—	—
1998–99	Adirondack Red Wings	AHL	71	17	15	32	96	3	0	1	1	0
1999–00	Detroit Red Wings	NHL	30	0	6	6	10	—	—	—	—	—
1999–00	Cincinnati Mighty Ducks	AHL	35	13	9	22	47	—	—	—	—	—
2000–01	Cleveland Lumberjacks	IHL	67	6	19	25	43	4	0	1	1	6
2001–02	Houston Aeros	AHL	31	11	6	17	57	—	—	—	—	—
2001–02	Providence Bruins	AHL	10	0	0	0	4	2	0	1	1	4
2002–03	Augusta Lynx	ECHL	19	2	4	6	16	—	—	—	—	—
2002–03	Jackson Bandits	ECHL	49	6	14	20	42	1	0	0	0	0
2003–04	Reading Royals	ECHL	9	0	4	4	25	—	—	—	—	—
2007–08	Bentley Generals	Chinook HL	4	0	0	0	4	—	—	—	—	—
2009–10	Bentley Generals	Chinook HL	13	9	7	16	16	5	2	3	5	6
2010–11	Bentley Generals	Chinook HL	4	1	1	2	0	4	3	2	5	4
2011–12	Bentley Generals	Chinook HL	17	10	12	22	30	3	0	1	1	4
2012–13	Innisfail Eagles	Chinook HL	1	0	0	0	14	—	—	—	—	—
2013–14	Innisfail Eagles	Chinook HL	15	4	4	8	24	8	2	1	3	2
NHL totals			35	0	6	6	10	—	—	—	—	—

Preceded by Grady Manson	Winner of the WHL Humanitarian of the Year Award; 1996	Succeeded by Jesse Wallin
