= Manex Arena =

Indoor arena in Brandon, Manitoba

Coordinates: 49.8327°N 99.9607°W

The Manex Arena was an indoor arena located in Brandon, Manitoba. It briefly hosted the Brandon Wheat Kings of the Western Hockey League between the demolition of the Wheat City Arena in 1969 and the construction of the Keystone Centre in 1972. Manex Arena was located in the same sports complex as the Keystone Centre, and was mostly demolished in 2004 to make way for a hotel. The frame of the arena still stands, housing a bar and part of the hotel's restaurant.
