= Peter Schaefer (ice hockey) =

Canadian ice hockey player (born 1977)

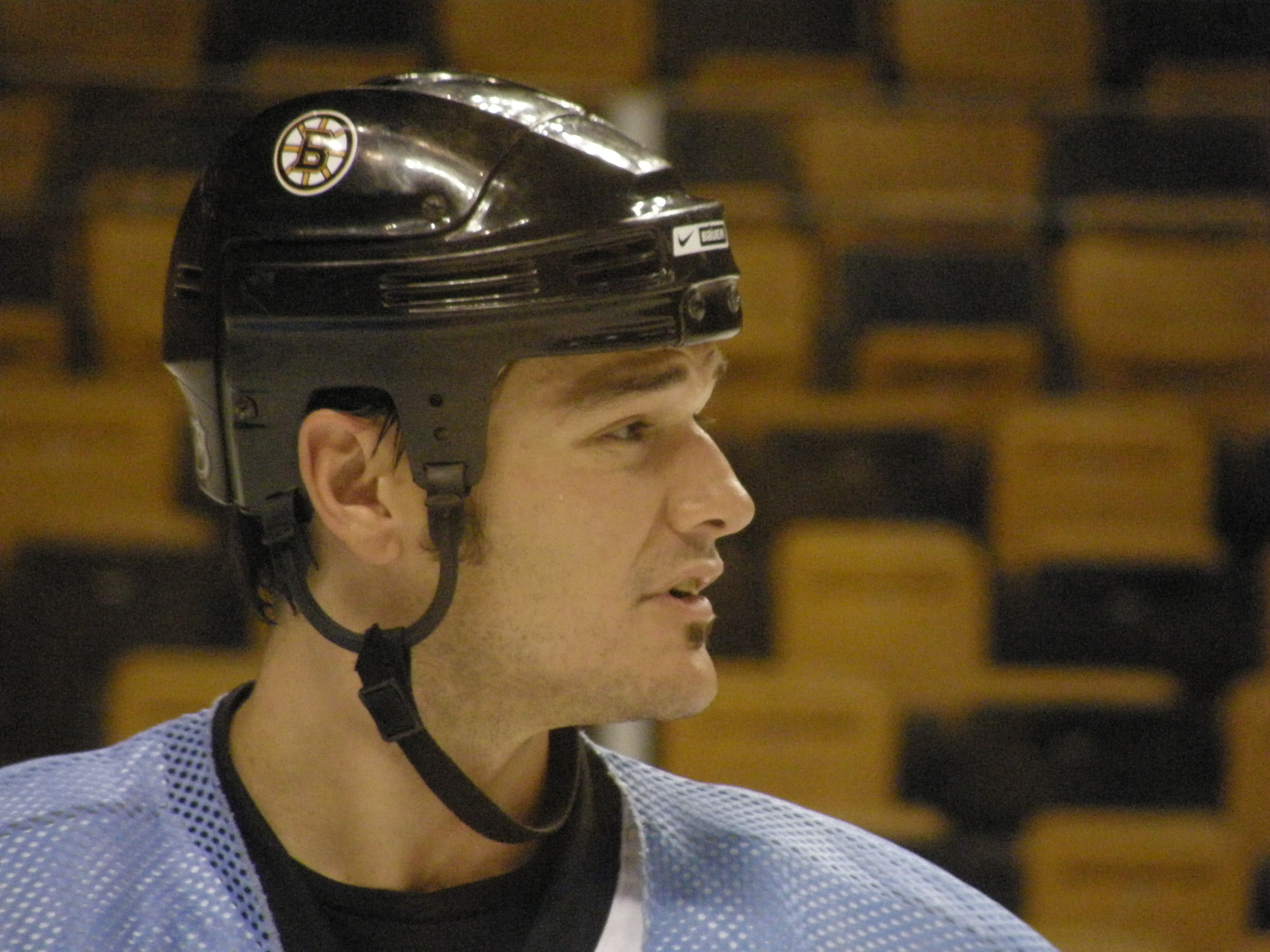
- Born: July 12, 1977 (age 48) Yellow Grass, Saskatchewan, Canada
- Height: 6 ft 1 in (185 cm)
- Weight: 200 lb (91 kg; 14 st 4 lb)
- Position: Left wing
- Shot: Left
- Played for: Vancouver Canucks; Ottawa Senators; Boston Bruins
- National team: Canada
- NHL draft: 66th overall, 1995; Vancouver Canucks
- Playing career: 1997–2011

Peter Schaefer (born July 12, 1977) is a Canadian former professional ice hockey player who played in the National Hockey League (NHL) for the Ottawa Senators, Boston Bruins and Vancouver Canucks. During his playing career, he was best known as a two-way forward. After his playing career, Schaefer most recently served as head coach, general manager and president of the Surrey Eagles of the British Columbia Hockey League (BCHL).

== Playing career ==
Schaefer played major junior in the Western Hockey League (WHL) with the Brandon Wheat Kings. He recorded 59 points in his rookie season with Brandon and was subsequently drafted by the Vancouver Canucks 66th overall in the 1995 NHL entry draft. The following season, in 1995–96, he improved to 108 points, ninth overall in the league, then added 23 points in the playoffs, leading Brandon to a President's Cup championship and 1996 Memorial Cup appearance.

Schaefer continued to improve in the WHL the following season, putting up a junior career-high 123 points, fourth overall in league scoring. On March 14, 1997, he tied a WHL record for most shorthanded goals in a game with 3 in an 8–1 win against the Medicine Hat Tigers. Schaefer earned the Four Broncos Memorial Trophy as league MVP as well as the WHL Plus-Minus Award with a league-high +57 rating in his final WHL season.

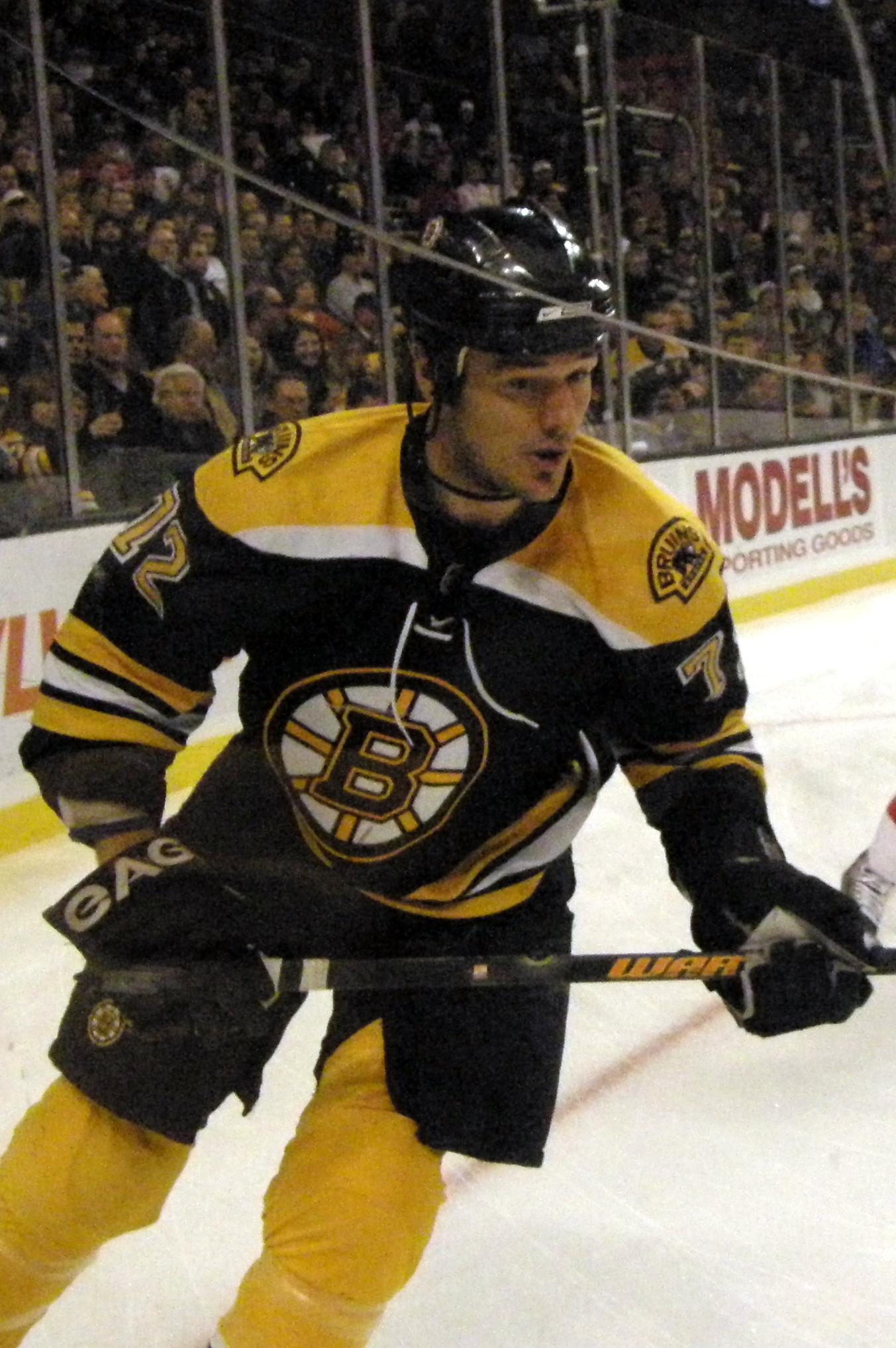
Schaefer with the Bruins

Schaefer assisted Team Canada in winning the gold medal at the IIHF U20 World Junior Championships in Geneva, Switzerland in 1997.

Graduating from major junior, Schaefer spent several seasons in the American Hockey League (AHL) with the Canucks' minor league affiliate, the Syracuse Crunch. He cracked the Canucks' lineup in 1998–99, scoring 8 points in 25 games. He improved to 31, then 36 points in the following two seasons before playing overseas for TPS of the SM-liiga in 2001–02.

Before the start of the 2002–03 season, Schaefer was traded to the Ottawa Senators in exchange for defenceman Sami Salo. In 2005–06, he recorded a career-high 20 goals, 30 assists and 50 points with the Senators. The following season, he helped the Senators to the 2007 Stanley Cup Finals, but lost to the Anaheim Ducks in five games.

In the off-season, on July 17, 2007, he was traded to the Boston Bruins in exchange for Shean Donovan. Ottawa general manager Bryan Murray later revealed that Schaefer had requested a trade on a couple of occasions during the season and that Schaefer was under-performing.

In Schaefer's first season with the Bruins, in 2007–08, his points total dipped to 26 points, his lowest output since 2002–03. He began the season on the top line with Marc Savard, but was quickly demoted to the fourth line and was a healthy scratch on several occasions after returning from leg and foot injuries. The following season, he failed to make the team's roster out of training camp. He was placed on waivers and once he cleared, was assigned to the Providence Bruins, Boston's AHL affiliate. After the 2008–09 season, the final year remaining on Schaefer's contract was bought out by the Bruins on June 30, 2009.

Schaefer did not play in the 2009–10 season, training extensively to make an NHL comeback while living in West Vancouver. After being invited to the Vancouver Canucks' 2010 training camp on a tryout basis, he was signed to a one-year, two-way, contract worth $600,000 on October 7, 2010. However, after 16 games, he was put on waivers by Vancouver in November 2010. Unwilling to play in the minors, the club put him on waivers a second time in order to release him. Schaefer's agent said both sides were amicable in the departure, agreeing to simply terminate the contract. Becoming an unrestricted free agent, he signed overseas with German team ERC Ingolstadt of the Deutsche Eishockey Liga (DEL) in January 2011.

After his playing career ended, Schaefer became an assistant coach of the Surrey Eagles of the British Columbia Hockey League (BCHL) for the 2012–13 season. The following season, he was named head coach, general manager and president of the team.

== Family ==
Schaefer's younger brother, Nolan Schaefer, was a goaltender who played for the San Jose Sharks for part of the 2005-2006 season. He also played many seasons in the AHL and Europe. His younger sister Falin played volleyball for the Canadian national team.

== Awards and achievements ==
- Named to the CHL First All-Star Team in 1996.
- Named to the WHL East First All-Star Team in 1996.
- Won the President's Cup (WHL champions) with the Brandon Wheat Kings in 1996.
- Named to the CHL First All-Star Team in 1997.
- Named to the WHL East First All-Star Team in 1997.
- Awarded the Four Broncos Memorial Trophy (WHL MVP) in 1997.
- Awarded the WHL Plus-Minus Award in 1997.

== Records ==
- WHL record for most shorthanded goals in one game – 3 (on March 14, 1997, against the Medicine Hat Tigers; tied with Kalvin Knibbs, Glen Goodall, Brett McLean, and Matt Calvert)

== Career statistics ==
=== Regular season and playoffs ===
			Regular season					Playoffs
Season	Team	League	GP	G	A	Pts	PIM	GP	G	A	Pts	PIM
1993–94	Yorkton Mallers	SMHL	32	27	14	41	133	—	—	—	—	—
1993–94	Brandon Wheat Kings	WHL	2	1	0	1	0	—	—	—	—	—
1994–95	Brandon Wheat Kings	WHL	68	27	32	59	34	18	5	3	8	18
1994–95	Brandon Wheat Kings	MC	—	—	—	—	—	4	3	0	3	0
1995–96	Brandon Wheat Kings	WHL	69	47	61	108	53	19	10	13	23	5
1995–96	Brandon Wheat Kings	MC	—	—	—	—	—	4	2	0	2	0
1996–97	Brandon Wheat Kings	WHL	61	49	74	123	85	6	1	4	5	4
1996–97	Syracuse Crunch	AHL	5	0	3	3	0	3	1	3	4	14
1997–98	Syracuse Crunch	AHL	73	19	44	63	41	5	2	1	3	2
1998–99	Vancouver Canucks	NHL	25	4	4	8	8	—	—	—	—	—
1998–99	Syracuse Crunch	AHL	41	10	19	29	66	—	—	—	—	—
1999–2000	Vancouver Canucks	NHL	71	16	15	31	20	—	—	—	—	—
1999–2000	Syracuse Crunch	AHL	2	0	0	0	2	—	—	—	—	—
2000–01	Vancouver Canucks	NHL	82	16	20	36	22	3	0	0	0	0
2001–02	TPS	SM-l	33	16	15	31	93	8	1	2	3	2
2002–03	Ottawa Senators	NHL	75	6	17	23	32	16	2	3	5	6
2003–04	Ottawa Senators	NHL	81	15	24	39	26	7	0	2	2	4
2004–05	HC Bolzano	ITA	15	11	14	25	10	10	1	7	8	12
2005–06	Ottawa Senators	NHL	82	20	30	50	40	10	2	5	7	14
2006–07	Ottawa Senators	NHL	77	12	34	46	32	20	1	5	6	10
2007–08	Boston Bruins	NHL	63	9	17	26	18	7	1	3	4	0
2008–09	Providence Bruins	AHL	47	7	19	26	10	16	3	4	7	2
2010–11	Vancouver Canucks	NHL	16	1	1	2	2	—	—	—	—	—
2010–11	ERC Ingolstadt	DEL	15	4	11	15	22	4	1	1	2	4
AHL totals			168	36	85	121	119	24	6	8	14	18
NHL totals			572	99	162	261	200	63	6	18	24	34

=== International ===
Year	Team	Event	GP	G	A	Pts	PIM
1997	Canada	WJC	7	3	1	4	4
2000	Canada	WC	8	1	0	1	4
2002	Canada	WC	7	0	1	1	2
Senior totals			15	1	1	2	6

Preceded by Jarome Iginla	Winner of the WHL Four Broncos Memorial Trophy; 1997	Succeeded by Sergei Varlamov
Preceded by Hugh Hamilton	Winner of the WHL Plus-Minus Award; 1997	Succeeded by Andrew Ference
