= Brett McLean =

Canadian ice hockey player (born 1978)

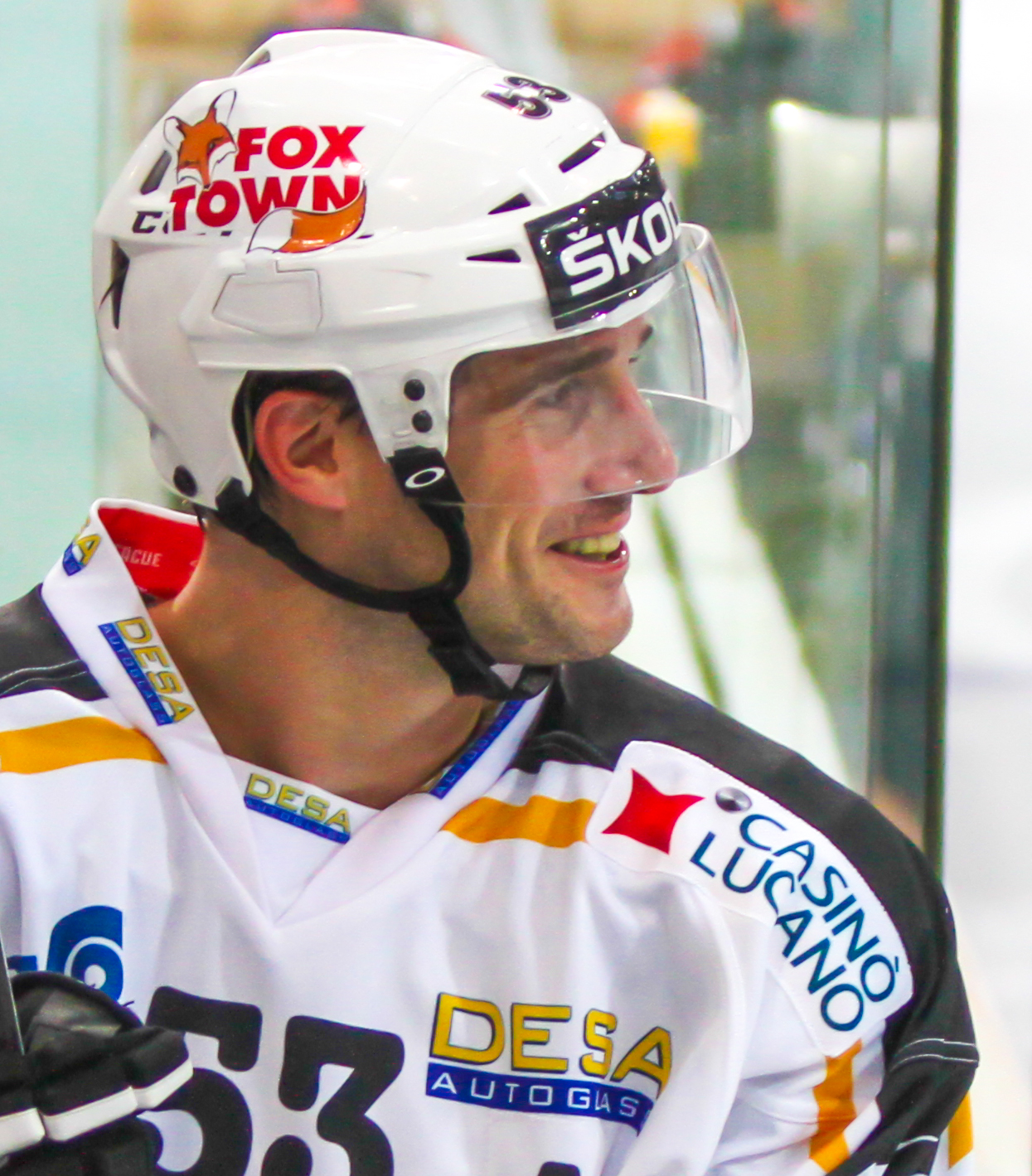
- McLean with HC Lugano in 2013
- Born: August 14, 1978 (age 47) Comox, British Columbia, Canada
- Height: 5 ft 11 in (180 cm)
- Weight: 185 lb (84 kg; 13 st 3 lb)
- Position: Centre
- Shot: Left
- Played for: Chicago Blackhawks; Malmö Redhawks; Colorado Avalanche; Florida Panthers; SC Bern; HC Lugano; EHC Black Wings Linz
- NHL draft: 242nd overall, 1997; Dallas Stars
- Playing career: 1999–2017
- Coaching career: 2020–present

Brett McLean (born August 14, 1978) is a Canadian former professional ice hockey centre who played in the National Hockey League for the Chicago Blackhawks, Colorado Avalanche and the Florida Panthers. McLean most recently served as an assistant coach with the Vancouver Canucks of the National Hockey League.

== Playing career ==
Brett McLean was selected with the sixth last pick, 242nd overall, in the 1997 NHL entry draft by the Dallas Stars. Despite a productive junior career with the Kelowna Rockets of the Western Hockey League, McLean was unable to earn a contract with the Stars. Unsigned, McLean toiled in the minor leagues with affiliates of the Calgary Flames and the Minnesota Wild before signing with the Chicago Blackhawks and making his NHL debut in the 2002–03 season.

In the 2003–04 season, McLean played his first full year in the NHL as he scored 11 goals with the rebuilding Blackhawks. He scored his first career NHL goal in his third career game on October 16, 2003, against Marc Denis and the Columbus Blue Jackets in a 2-1 Blackhawks loss. He signed as a free agent with the Colorado Avalanche on July 21, 2004. In 2004–05, he joined the Malmö Redhawks of the Swedish Elitserien during the NHL lockout. He scored a career-high 40 points in 2005–06 with the Avalanche and backed this up with 15 even-strength goals in the 2006–07 season.

On July 1, 2007, McLean signed a three-year contract with the Florida Panthers. In his first season with the Panthers in 2007–08, McLean finished 5th on the team in points with 37 in 67 games. He failed to reproduce the same form in the 2008–09 season as his points total dipped to 19. Following the Panthers' failure to reach the playoffs, McLean was bought out of the remaining year of his contract on June 29, 2009.

On September 9, 2009, McLean was invited to the Tampa Bay Lightning training camp for the 2009–10 season. McLean was among the final cuts before the season began and was released. On October 10, 2009, McLean signed a one-year contract with SC Bern, in the Swiss National League A.

On July 1, 2011, after two years spent in Europe, McLean signed a two-way contract with the Chicago Blackhawks. Unable to stick with the Blackhawks out of training camp, McLean was assigned to their affiliate, the Rockford IceHogs of the AHL. Upon reaching the midpoint of the 2011–12 season without a recall, McLean sought a release and returned to the Swiss NLA, signing and later extending for a further season with HC Lugano on March 15, 2012.

On June 3, 2015, McLean left the NLA after six seasons and signed a one-year contract with Austrian club EHC Black Wings Linz of the EBEL. After two productive seasons with Linz, at after completing his 18th full professional season in 2016–17, McLean opted to end his professional career and return home to Canada on March 22, 2017.

== Coaching career ==
On June 5, 2025, McLean was hired by the Vancouver Canucks as an assistant coach to Adam Foote. On May 19, 2026, the Canucks fired Foote and his coaching staff, including McLean, after the team finished the season in last place with a 25–49–8 record.

Prior to his tenure with the Canucks, McLean spent eight years in the Minnesota Wild organization. His first six years were split working as an assistant coach for Minnesota's AHL affiliate Iowa Wild and as an assistant coach in the NHL, before serving his final two years as the head coach of Iowa.

== Career statistics ==
=== Regular season and playoffs ===
| | | | Regular season | | | | | Playoffs |
| Season | Team | League | GP | G | A | Pts | PIM | GP | G | A | Pts | PIM |
|---|---|---|---|---|---|---|---|---|---|---|---|---|
| 1994–95 | Tacoma Rockets | WHL | 67 | 11 | 23 | 34 | 33 | 4 | 0 | 1 | 1 | 0 |
| 1995–96 | Kelowna Rockets | WHL | 71 | 37 | 42 | 79 | 60 | 6 | 2 | 2 | 4 | 6 |
| 1996–97 | Kelowna Rockets | WHL | 72 | 44 | 60 | 104 | 96 | 6 | 4 | 2 | 6 | 12 |
| 1997–98 | Kelowna Rockets | WHL | 54 | 42 | 46 | 88 | 91 | 7 | 4 | 5 | 9 | 17 |
| 1998–99 | Kelowna Rockets | WHL | 44 | 32 | 38 | 70 | 46 | — | — | — | — | — |
| 1998–99 | Brandon Wheat Kings | WHL | 21 | 15 | 16 | 31 | 20 | 5 | 1 | 6 | 7 | 8 |
| 1998–99 | Cincinnati Mighty Ducks | AHL | 7 | 0 | 3 | 3 | 6 | — | — | — | — | — |
| 1999–00 | Johnstown Chiefs | ECHL | 8 | 4 | 7 | 11 | 6 | — | — | — | — | — |
| 1999–00 | Saint John Flames | AHL | 72 | 15 | 23 | 38 | 115 | 3 | 0 | 1 | 1 | 2 |
| 2000–01 | Cleveland Lumberjacks | IHL | 74 | 20 | 24 | 44 | 54 | 4 | 0 | 0 | 0 | 18 |
| 2001–02 | Houston Aeros | AHL | 78 | 24 | 21 | 45 | 71 | 14 | 1 | 6 | 7 | 12 |
| 2002–03 | Norfolk Admirals | AHL | 77 | 23 | 38 | 61 | 60 | 9 | 2 | 6 | 8 | 9 |
| 2002–03 | Chicago Blackhawks | NHL | 2 | 0 | 0 | 0 | 0 | — | — | — | — | — |
| 2003–04 | Norfolk Admirals | AHL | 4 | 3 | 3 | 6 | 6 | — | — | — | — | — |
| 2003–04 | Chicago Blackhawks | NHL | 76 | 11 | 20 | 31 | 54 | — | — | — | — | — |
| 2004–05 | Malmö IF | SEL | 38 | 7 | 6 | 13 | 102 | — | — | — | — | — |
| 2005–06 | Colorado Avalanche | NHL | 82 | 9 | 31 | 40 | 51 | 8 | 0 | 1 | 1 | 4 |
| 2006–07 | Colorado Avalanche | NHL | 78 | 15 | 20 | 35 | 36 | — | — | — | — | — |
| 2007–08 | Florida Panthers | NHL | 67 | 14 | 23 | 37 | 34 | — | — | — | — | — |
| 2008–09 | Florida Panthers | NHL | 80 | 7 | 12 | 19 | 29 | — | — | — | — | — |
| 2009–10 | SC Bern | NLA | 34 | 13 | 20 | 33 | 24 | 15 | 5 | 7 | 12 | 8 |
| 2010–11 | SC Bern | NLA | 50 | 10 | 17 | 27 | 22 | 6 | 3 | 0 | 3 | 6 |
| 2011–12 | Rockford IceHogs | AHL | 36 | 7 | 14 | 21 | 20 | — | — | — | — | — |
| 2011–12 | HC Lugano | NLA | 10 | 5 | 1 | 6 | 4 | 6 | 0 | 3 | 3 | 4 |
| 2012–13 | HC Lugano | NLA | 50 | 13 | 24 | 37 | 44 | 6 | 1 | 6 | 7 | 6 |
| 2013–14 | HC Lugano | NLA | 50 | 18 | 26 | 44 | 52 | 5 | 0 | 0 | 0 | 10 |
| 2014–15 | HC Lugano | NLA | 47 | 9 | 21 | 30 | 14 | 6 | 3 | 0 | 3 | 2 |
| 2015–16 | EHC Black Wings Linz | EBEL | 52 | 13 | 47 | 60 | 40 | 12 | 3 | 8 | 11 | 4 |
| 2016–17 | EHC Black Wings Linz | EBEL | 39 | 9 | 27 | 36 | 14 | 5 | 0 | 1 | 1 | 0 |
| NHL totals | | | 385 | 56 | 106 | 162 | 204 | 8 | 0 | 1 | 1 | 4 |

Medal record

Ice hockey

Representing Canada

Spengler Cup
| Gold medal – first place | 2012 Davos | |

=== International ===
| Year | Team | Event | Result | GP | G | A | Pts | PIM |
|---|---|---|---|---|---|---|---|---|
| 1998 | Canada | WJC | 8th | 7 | 1 | 1 | 2 | 4 |
| Junior totals | | | | 7 | 1 | 1 | 2 | 4 |

== Awards and honours ==
| Award | Year |
|---|---|
WHL
| West Second All-Star Team | 1997 |
| West Second All-Star Team | 1998 |
