= Justin Kurtz =

Canadian retired ice hockey defenceman (born 1977)

- Born: January 14, 1977 (age 49) Winnipeg, Manitoba, Canada
- Height: 6 ft 0 in (183 cm)
- Weight: 188 lb (85 kg; 13 st 6 lb)
- Position: Defence
- Shot: Left
- Played for: Vancouver Canucks; Manitoba Moose; Worcester Sharks; Las Vegas Thunder; Krefeld Pinguine; HC Milano; Nordsjælland Cobras; Örebro HK; EHC Black Wings Linz; Dresdner Eislöwen
- NHL draft: 84th overall, 1995; Winnipeg Jets
- Playing career: 1997–2013

Justin Kurtz (born January 14, 1977) is a Canadian former professional ice hockey defenceman who played 27 games for the National Hockey League's Vancouver Canucks.

== Playing career ==
Kurtz was drafted 84th overall by the Winnipeg Jets in the 1995 NHL entry draft, but never played an NHL game for the franchise. His NHL debut did not come until the 2001-02 season with the Vancouver Canucks, after spending three seasons with the Manitoba Moose. He played 27 regular season games, scoring 3 goals and 8 points in what turned out to be his only season in the NHL.

He spent another season with Manitoba before moving to Europe in 2003, playing in the Deutsche Eishockey Liga for the Krefeld Pinguine in two years. In 2005, he moved to the 2nd Bundesliga with EHC Wolfsburg Grizzly Adams, who were aiming to regain a place in the DEL having been relegated the previous season. However, they were unsuccessful and Kurtz returned to North America with the Worcester Sharks.

In 2007, Kurtz moved to Italy, signing with HCJ Milano Vipers. After one year he left the club and moved to Nordsjælland Cobras of Denmark's Oddset Ligaen in 2008. Kurtz later enjoyed spells with Örebro HK in Sweden and Fischtown Pinguins of the German 2nd Bundesliga before joining the EHC Black Wings Linz of the Austrian Hockey League. He last played for the Dresdner Eislöwen of the 2nd Bundesliga before retiring from professional hockey in 2013.

== Career statistics ==
			Regular season					Playoffs
Season	Team	League	GP	G	A	Pts	PIM	GP	G	A	Pts	PIM
1993–94	Brandon Wheat Kings	WHL	63	3	13	16	37	14	1	3	4	24
1994–95	Brandon Wheat Kings	WHL	65	8	34	42	75	18	2	2	4	26
1995–96	Brandon Wheat Kings	WHL	53	19	55	74	107	18	4	6	10	37
1996–97	Brandon Wheat Kings	WHL	59	24	44	68	85	6	3	2	5	4
1997–98	Las Vegas Thunder	IHL	63	11	11	22	62	—	—	—	—	—
1997–98	Saint John Flames	AHL	4	0	0	0	6	6	0	0	0	0
1998–99	Louisiana IceGators	ECHL	6	1	4	5	6	—	—	—	—	—
1998–99	Manitoba Moose	IHL	38	4	6	10	40	5	0	0	0	4
1999–00	Manitoba Moose	IHL	66	3	15	18	94	2	0	0	0	0
2000–01	Manitoba Moose	IHL	69	8	22	30	62	13	2	3	5	12
2001–02	Manitoba Moose	AHL	52	10	29	39	64	7	0	4	4	4
2001–02	Vancouver Canucks	NHL	27	3	5	8	14	—	—	—	—	—
2002–03	Manitoba Moose	AHL	71	11	28	39	65	14	3	4	7	17
2003–04	Krefeld Pinguine	DEL	48	7	15	22	70	—	—	—	—	—
2004–05	Krefeld Pinguine	DEL	52	7	16	23	72	—	—	—	—	—
2005–06	EHC Wolfsburg	2.GBun	50	13	34	47	159	4	0	1	1	2
2006–07	Worcester Sharks	AHL	55	3	7	10	46	3	1	2	3	4
2007–08	HC Milano	ITL	36	9	16	25	56	9	1	7	8	10
2008–09	Nordsjælland Cobras	DEN	39	7	26	33	112	4	1	1	2	12
2009–10	Örebro HK	Swe.1	50	9	10	19	81	—	—	—	—	—
2010–11	Fischtown Pinguins	2.GBun	48	7	33	40	101	4	1	0	1	2
2011–12	EHC Black Wings Linz	EBEL	33	0	6	6	89	—	—	—	—	—
2012–13	Dresdner Eislöwen	2.GBun	23	2	8	10	50	—	—	—	—	—
NHL totals			27	3	5	8	14	—	—	—	—	—

== Awards and honours ==
Award	Year
WHL
East Second All-Star Team	1996
East Second All-Star Team	1997
