= Mark Deyell =

Canadian ice hockey player

- Born: March 26, 1976 (age 50) Regina, Saskatchewan, Canada
- Height: 6 ft 0 in (183 cm)
- Weight: 170 lb (77 kg; 12 st 2 lb)
- Position: Centre
- Shot: Right
- Played for: Davos HC; Jokerit; Hamilton Bulldogs; St. John's Maple Leafs; Saskatoon Blades
- NHL draft: 126th overall, 1994; Toronto Maple Leafs
- Playing career: 1996–2001

Mark Kenneth Deyell (born March 26, 1976) is a Canadian former professional ice hockey centre who was drafted by the Toronto Maple Leafs in the National Hockey League (NHL). As of 2020, Deyell ranks 4th in the Saskatoon Blades all-time leaders in points and 80th in the Western Hockey League all-time leaders in assists. He led the Western Hockey League with 159 points in its 1995–96 season, earning the Bob Clarke Trophy; since then, no other player has surpassed this single-season performance.

== Playing career ==
Deyell played major junior hockey with the Saskatoon Blades of the Western Hockey League. While playing with the Saskatoon Blades, Deyell was selected with the 126th overall pick in the 1994 NHL entry draft by the Toronto Maple Leafs. In his final season with the Saskatoon Blades, Deyell scored 159 points in only 69 games played, outscoring star NHL player Jarome Iginla. He earned the Bob Clarke Trophy that season for being the top scorer. After his last season with the Saskatoon Blades, Deyell played with the St. John's Maple Leafs for three seasons.

In April 1999, Deyell took a stick to his right eye during an AHL playoff game, when a player on the opposing team was following through on a shot, ending his career. In September 2000, Deyell was signed by the Edmonton Oilers and went on to play 17 games for their AHL affiliate Hamilton Bulldogs that season. That same season, Deyell played 4 games with HC Davos in the Swiss National League A and in the 2000 Spengler Cup with Jokerit.

== Career statistics ==
			Regular season					Playoffs
Season	Team	League	GP	G	A	Pts	PIM	GP	G	A	Pts	PIM
1992–93	Winnipeg Mavericks	MMHL	35	45	56	101	125	—	—	—	—	—
1993–94	Saskatoon Blades	WHL	66	17	36	53	52	16	5	2	7	20
1994–95	Saskatoon Blades	WHL	70	34	68	102	56	10	2	5	7	14
1995–96	Saskatoon Blades	WHL	69	61	98	159	122	4	0	5	5	8
1996–97	St. John's Maple Leafs	AHL	58	15	27	42	30	10	1	5	6	6
1997–98	St. John's Maple Leafs	AHL	72	20	45	65	75	4	1	1	2	4
1998–99	St. John's Maple Leafs	AHL	44	20	27	47	39	3	0	3	3	0
2000–01	Hamilton Bulldogs	AHL	17	4	5	9	10	—	—	—	—	—
2000–01	HC Davos	NLA	4	0	1	1	0	—	—	—	—	—
AHL totals			191	59	104	163	154	17	2	9	11	10

== Awards ==
- WHL Bob Clarke Trophy – 1996
- WHL East First All-Star Team – 1996
