= Robb Gordon =

Canadian ice hockey player

- Born: January 13, 1976 (age 50) Murrayville, British Columbia, Canada
- Height: 5 ft 11 in (180 cm)
- Weight: 180 lb (82 kg; 12 st 12 lb)
- Position: Centre
- Shot: Right
- Played for: Vancouver Canucks; Syracuse Crunch; Long Beach Ice Dogs; Raleigh IceCaps
- NHL draft: 39th overall, 1994; Vancouver Canucks
- Playing career: 1996–2000

Robb Gordon (born January 13, 1976) is a Canadian retired professional ice hockey centre who played briefly in the National Hockey League for the Vancouver Canucks. Selected by the Canucks in the 1994 NHL entry draft, he played four games for the team in the 1998–99 season, spending the rest of his career in the minor leagues before retiring in 2000. Internationally Gordon played for the Canadian national junior team at the 1996 World Junior Championships, winning a gold medal.

== Playing career ==
Medal record

Representing Canada

World Junior Championships
Gold medal – first place	1996 United States	

Gordon was born in Murrayville, British Columbia and raised in Surrey, British Columbia. He was selected in the second round (39th overall) of the 1994 NHL entry draft by the Vancouver Canucks following a season in the BCHL with the Powell River Paper Kings. He played college hockey for the Michigan Wolverines alongside future NHL players such as John Madden, Brendan Morrison, and Mike Knuble. After his freshman season, he left the Wolverines and played in the Western Hockey League for the Kelowna Rockets, where he scored 114 points in 58 games. He would play for Canada at the 1996 World Junior Championships, winning a gold medal.

Gordon experienced a difficult transition to professional hockey, in large part due to his sub-par skating. He would score 25 points in 63 games for the Syracuse Crunch, Vancouver's AHL affiliate in 1996–97, and was at one point sent down to the ECHL. The following season, he would record 10 points in 40 games. He was called up to the Canucks in the 1998–99 season, playing four games for the team, while scoring 16 goals and 38 points for Syracuse. However, he was released by Vancouver the following season. Following his release from the Canucks, Gordon spent a season in the International Hockey League with the Long Beach Ice Dogs, recording 18 points in 50 games, and retired in 2000.

== Career statistics ==
=== Regular season and playoffs ===
			Regular season					Playoffs
Season	Team	League	GP	G	A	Pts	PIM	GP	G	A	Pts	PIM
1992–93	Powell River Paper Kings	BCJHL	60	55	38	93	76	18	8	10	18	—
1993–94	Powell River Paper Kings	BCJHL	60	69	89	158	141	10	11	14	25	29
1994–95	University of Michigan	NCAA	39	15	26	41	72	—	—	—	—	—
1995–96	Kelowna Rockets	WHL	58	51	63	114	84	6	3	6	9	19
1996–97	Syracuse Crunch	AHL	63	11	14	25	72	3	0	0	0	7
1997–98	Syracuse Crunch	AHL	40	4	6	10	35	—	—	—	—	—
1997–98	Raleigh IceCaps	ECHL	7	3	10	13	28	—	—	—	—	—
1998–99	Vancouver Canucks	NHL	4	0	0	0	2	—	—	—	—	—
1998–99	Syracuse Crunch	AHL	68	16	22	38	98	—	—	—	—	—
1999–00	Long Beach Ice Dogs	IHL	50	7	11	18	54	1	0	0	0	0
AHL totals			171	31	42	73	205	3	0	0	0	7
NHL totals			4	0	0	0	2	—	—	—	—	—

=== International ===
Year	Team	Event	GP	G	A	Pts	PIM
1996	Canada	WJC	6	0	4	4	0
Junior totals			6	0	4	4	0

== Awards and honours ==
Award	Year
WHL West First All-Star team	1995-96
All-CCHA Rookie Team	1994-95
