= Innisfail Eagles =

Canadian senior ice hockey team

- City: Innisfail, Alberta
- League: NCHL
- Founded: 1947
- Home arena: Innisfail Twin Arena
- Colours
- General manager: Ryan Dodd
- Head coach: Ryan Dodd
- Website: innisfaileagles.com

The Innisfail Eagles are a senior ice hockey club and franchise of the North Central Hockey League (NCHL). The team plays its home games at the Innisfail Twin Arena in Innisfail, Alberta.

== History ==
The Eagles were founded in 1947.

Alberta Senior AA champions in 2012–13, the Eagles moved up to compete at the Senior AAA level for 2013–14. They played in the Allan Cup Hockey West until 2020 and moved to the Senior AA Ranchland League in 2021–22.

== Season-by-season record ==
Note: GP = Games played, W = Wins, L = Losses, T = Ties, OTL = Overtime losses, Pts = Points, GF = Goals for, GA = Goals against

Season	GP	W	L	T	OTL	GF	GA	P	Results
2007–08	20	8	12	-	0	85	100	16	4th ChHL
2008–09	24	5	19	-	0	77	142	14	6th ChHL
2009–10	20	4	16	-	0	70	150	9	5th ChHL
2010–11	20	5	15	-	0	72	137	10	5th ChHL
2011–12	24	1	23	-	0	60	178	4	7th ChHL
2012–13	16	8	7	-	1	52	58	17	3rd ChHL
2013–14	5	3	2	-	0	14	15	6	ChHL

== Notable alumni ==
- Brian Sutter (coach)
- Peter Vandermeer
- Kevin Smyth
- Darryl Laplante
- Mike Brodeur

== Sources ==
- Bachusky, Johnnie (23 May 2024). "Innisfail Eagles officially give up chance to host Allan Cup". The Albertan. Great West Media.
- Bachusky, Johnnie (30 April 2025). "Innisfail Eagles awarded during historic season-ending banquet". The Albertan. Great West Media.
- Bachusky, Johnnie (23 March 2026). "Innisfail Eagles swept in NCHL senior men's AA finals". Rocky Mountain Outlook. Great West Media.
- Hall, Josh (5 October 2026). "80th season underway for historic Innisfail Eagles franchise". rdnewsnow.com. Pattison Media.
- Singh, Manjot; Barrow, Tyler (14 October 2026). "Innisfail Eagles celebrate 80 years of senior hockey". CTVNews. Bell Media.
- Elsaadi, Lina (29 October 2026). "Innisfail hockey team hits 8 decades of uniting central Alberta town". CBC News. CBC/Radio-Canada.
