= Keystone Centre =

Multi-use indoor arena in Brandon, Manitoba

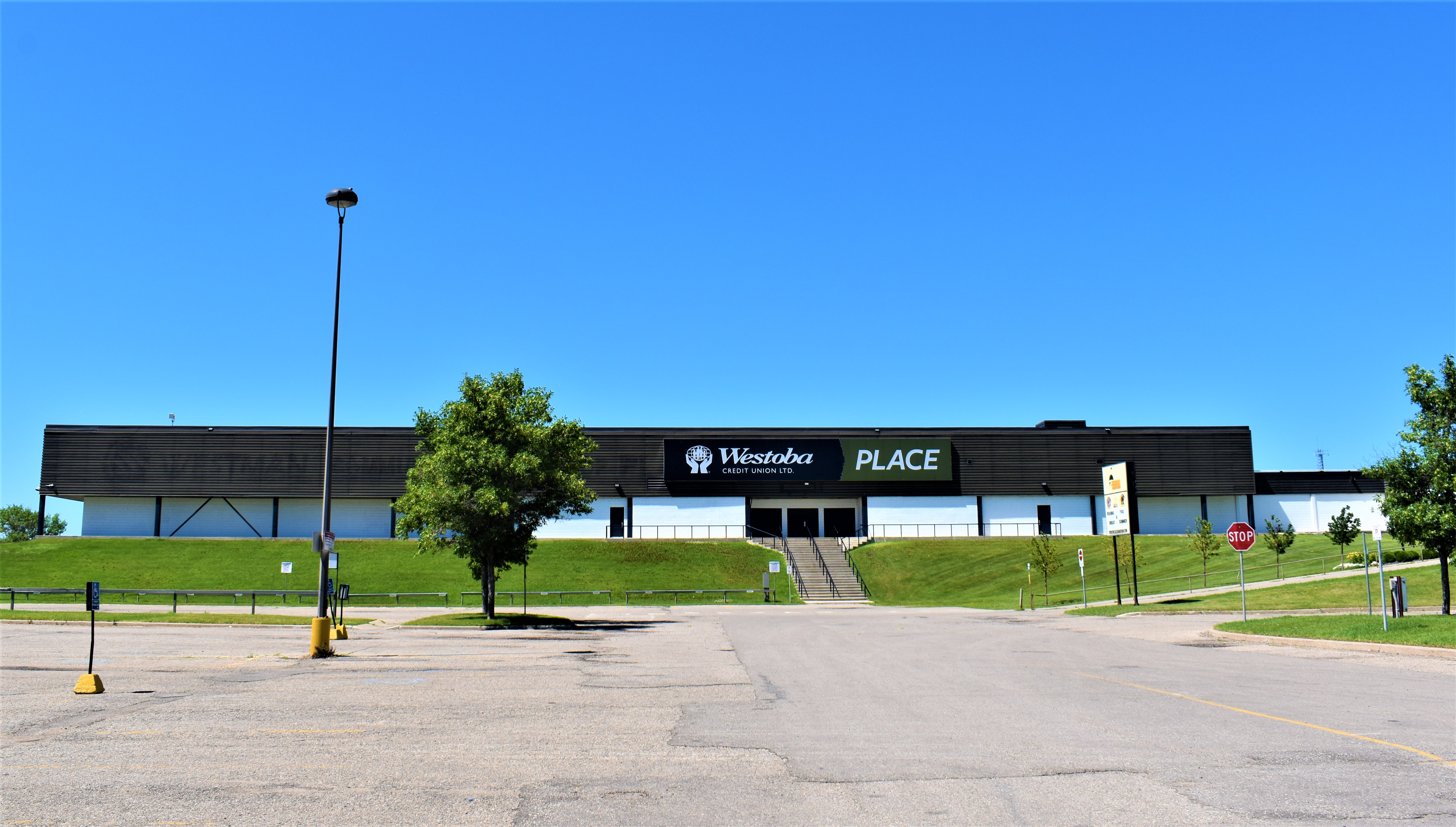

- Location within Manitoba Location within Canada
- Location: 1175 18th Street; Brandon, Manitoba, R7A 7C5
- Coordinates: 49°49′51″N 99°57′36″W
- Owner: Keystone Agricultural & Recreation Centre Inc.
- Operator: Keystone Agricultural & Recreation Centre Inc.
- Capacity: 5,102 (Hockey); 5,000 (Royal Manitoba Winter Fair)
- Surface: Multi-surface

Construction
- Groundbreaking: November 13, 1970
- Opened: April 2, 1973
- Expanded: 1982, 1992
- Cost: $3.4 million ($25.5 million in 2025 dollars)
- Architects: Ward & Macdonald Associates

Tenants
- Brandon Wheat Kings (WHL) (1972–present); Provincial Exhibition of Manitoba (1972–present)

Website
- www.keystonecentre.com

The Keystone Centre is a multi-purpose facility located in Brandon, Manitoba. Its main 5,102-seat arena, which is known as Assiniboine Credit Union Place, is the home of the Brandon Wheat Kings of the Western Hockey League and the annual Royal Manitoba Winter Fair.

== History ==
The original structure was built in 1973 and was known as the Keystone Centre. It was a joint venture between the City of Brandon, the Government of Manitoba, and the Provincial Exhibition of Manitoba, which organizes the Royal Fair each March. The Keystone Agricultural and Recreation Centre Inc., a non-profit corporation formed by the three parties, owns and operates the complex and grounds. The Provincial Exhibition of Manitoba contributed the original land and assets. The City of Brandon and the Province of Manitoba have agreed to cover any operating deficits of the Keystone Centre.

The Keystone Centre was established through an agreement between the City of Brandon and the Province of Manitoba that saw the two parties share equally in any deficit of the Keystone. The Provincial Exhibition of Manitoba contributed the land and assets of the day, and the three parties formed the leadership of the corporation.

A ten-member board of directors consisting of two representatives from the City of Brandon, two from the Province of Manitoba and two from the Provincial Exhibition, in addition to four members at large from the community appointed by the Leadership Group. The corporation employs a general manager and staff who carry out the management and operation of the facility.

There have been several expansions to the Keystone Centre. In 1982 approximately 30,000 square feet of space was added with the development of the Manitoba Room, Pioneer Lounge, and Amphitheatre. In 1992, in response to ever-growing needs in the community, a major expansion was completed which added 165,000 square feet of new tradeshow and recreation space.

Today the Keystone Centre sits on approximately 90 acres in Brandon's busiest commercial district and offers 540,000 square feet of multi-use all under one roof. As a significant contributor to the quality of life in Westman, the Keystone Centre plays an important role in the area of social and economic impact. Boasting over 1,500 event days annually, the Keystone Centre hosts a diverse array of activities providing a large component of the social, recreational, cultural and agricultural fabric of the area, and is one of Brandon's largest economic catalysts.

The Canad Inns hotel replaced the Manex Arena, the former home of the Wheat Kings. The complex underwent through an interior redesign in the summer of 2007. The Keystone Centre also features an exhibition hall for trade shows and agricultural events, two smaller hockey arenas, and the Brandon Curling Club.

On May 1, 2007, Westman Communications Group purchased the naming rights to the main arena and viewing lounge. Westman Communications Group ended their naming rights to the main arena in October 2017, and signage was removed in January, 2018. On February 2, 2018, Westoba Credit Union purchased the naming rights to the main arena and viewing lounge.

== Events ==
The Westoba Place hosted the 2010 Memorial Cup. Other major events held at the Keystone Centre include the 1999 World Junior Ice Hockey Championships (co-hosted with Winnipeg), the 1995 Ford Men's and Women's World Curling Championships, the 1982 Labatt Brier, the 1993 and 2002 Scott Tournament of Hearts, the 1997 Canadian Olympic Curling Trials, and the 1994 Air Canada Cup. On October 13, 2017, Curling Canada announced that the 2019 Tim Hortons Brier will take place at the Keystone Centre from March 2 to 10.

The Western Canadian Junior "B" Hockey Championship, the Keystone Cup, is named after the Keystone Centre as it was the alternate site used by the original tournament in 1983 that took place in Portage la Prairie, Manitoba.

WWE held their flagship Monday Night Raw event on October 23, 1995.
