= Brandon Wheat Kings =

Western Hockey League team in Brandon, Manitoba

- City: Brandon, Manitoba, Canada
- League: Western Hockey League
- Conference: Eastern
- Division: East
- Founded: 1936
- Home arena: Assiniboine Credit Union Place
- Colours: Gold, black, white
- General manager: Marty Murray
- Head coach: Marty Murray
- Website: chl.ca/whl-wheatkings

Franchise history
- 1936–1938: Brandon Wheat Kings (MJHL)
- 1938–1940: Brandon Elks (MJHL)
- 1940–1967: Brandon Wheat Kings (MJHL)
- 1967–present: Brandon Wheat Kings (WHL)

Championships
- Regular season titles: 5 (1976–77, 1977–78, 1978–79, 1995–96, 2014–15)
- Playoff championships: Ed Chynoweth Cup; 3 (1979, 1996, 2016) Conference Championships; 5 (1995–96, 1997–98, 2004–05, 2014–15, 2015–16)

Current uniform

The Brandon Wheat Kings are a Canadian major junior ice hockey team based in Brandon, Manitoba. Founded in 1936, the team was for three decades a successful junior team playing principally in the Manitoba Junior Hockey League. The Wheat Kings joined the Western Hockey League ahead of the 1967–68 season, and today play in the East Division of the Eastern Conference, hosting games at Keystone Centre. The team owns the best regular season record in WHL history from the 1978–79 season, when the Wheat Kings posted 58 wins and 125 points. That season, they won their first of three league championships.

== History ==
=== Early years ===
The Wheat Kings were named in honor of the Brandon Wheat City senior team that participated in the 1904 Stanley Cup Challenge, losing to the Ottawa Senators. The Wheat Kings team was founded in 1936 as a member of the Manitoba Junior Hockey League (MJHL), although the team was known as the Elks for a short time in the late 1930s. Playing out of Wheat City Arena, the team won eight Turnbull Cup Championships as Manitoba Junior Champions and appeared in the Memorial Cup finals in 1949 after winning the Abbott Cup as the Western Canadian junior champion. The 1949 Brandon Wheat Kings were inducted into the Manitoba Hockey Hall of Fame. During the 1950s, the Wheat Kings left the MJHL for a time to play in the Big Six Intermediate Hockey League. Later, in 1964, Brandon left the MJHL again and spent two seasons playing in the Saskatchewan Junior Hockey League instead. The team then returned to the MJHL for one season before joining the major junior Western Canada Junior Hockey League in 1967.

=== Western Hockey League ===
The Wheat Kings had a challenging start in the new league—over their first nine seasons, the team posted only two winning records and won only a single playoff series. In 1970, the team moved briefly to Manex Arena, before moving to the new Keystone Centre in 1973. The same year, the team began operating a farm team in the MJHL, called the Brandon Travellers, an arrangement that would last until 1980. The Wheat Kings began a short period of success in 1976. Led by the likes of Brian Propp, Brad McCrimmon, and Ray Allison, the team won three straight regular season titles from 1976–77 to 1978–79, advancing to two league finals and capturing their first championship in 1979, defeating the Portland Winter Hawks in 6 games in the final. The Wheat Kings advanced to the Memorial Cup for the first time since 1949, again to lose in the final, this time in a 2–1 overtime defeat against the Peterborough Petes in what has been cited as one of the best finals in the tournament's history. Infamously, with the team down three defencemen, McCrimmon played all but two minutes of the Memorial Cup final—he left the ice only to serve a minor penalty. The Wheat Kings 1978–79 campaign set a WHL record for points with 125. At the 1979 National Hockey League draft, ten members of the 1978–79 Wheat Kings were selected, including four in the first round. This proved to be a peak for the club, as over the following fourteen seasons the Wheat Kings would miss the playoffs altogether eight times, and win only two playoff series. One highlight came in the 1983–84 season, when Ray Ferraro set a league record with a 108-goal season.

In the late 1980s, Brad McCrimmon's brother, Kelly McCrimmon, took over as team manager. Under his guidance, the Wheat Kings again rose to prominence, making three finals appearances in a four-season span between 1994–95 and 1997–98. Despite losing the 1995 final, the team advanced to the Memorial Cup because they lost to the host Kamloops Blazers; at the tournament, Brandon lost the semi-final 2–1 to the Detroit Junior Red Wings. Their best result came in 1995–96, when the team, coached by Bob Lowes and led on the ice by the likes of Wade Redden and Peter Schaefer, posted its first 50-win season since 1979, winning the regular season title. The team then lost only three games in the playoffs en route to its second playoff championship. The Wheat Kings thus advanced to a second consecutive Memorial Cup tournament; they again bowed out in the semi-final, losing 4–3 to Peterborough. Throughout this period the Wheat Kings became a perennial playoff contender, missing the postseason only twice between 1993 and 2018.

The Wheat Kings were selected to host the 2010 Memorial Cup tournament, ensuring their fifth appearance. Led by Matt Calvert, Brayden Schenn, and Toni Rajala, Brandon put together a 50-win season, reached the Eastern Conference final and the Memorial Cup final. There, the Wheat Kings lost to the Windsor Spitfires, who claimed their second straight national title. Brandon would return to the Memorial Cup for a sixth time in 2016 after winning its third Ed Chynoweth Cup as league champions. However, the 2016 tournament would mark the first time the team failed to advance to at least the semi-final as they dropped three straight games. After the season, Kelly McCrimmon was hired by the National Hockey League's Vegas Golden Knights—his departure from Brandon marked the end of an era.

In a shortened 2020–21 WHL campaign played exclusively in-division and without playoffs—the season was modified due to the COVID-19 pandemic—Brandon finished atop the East Division with an 18–4–2 record. In 2022, the team hired former player Marty Murray to be its new coach and manager.

== Season-by-season record ==
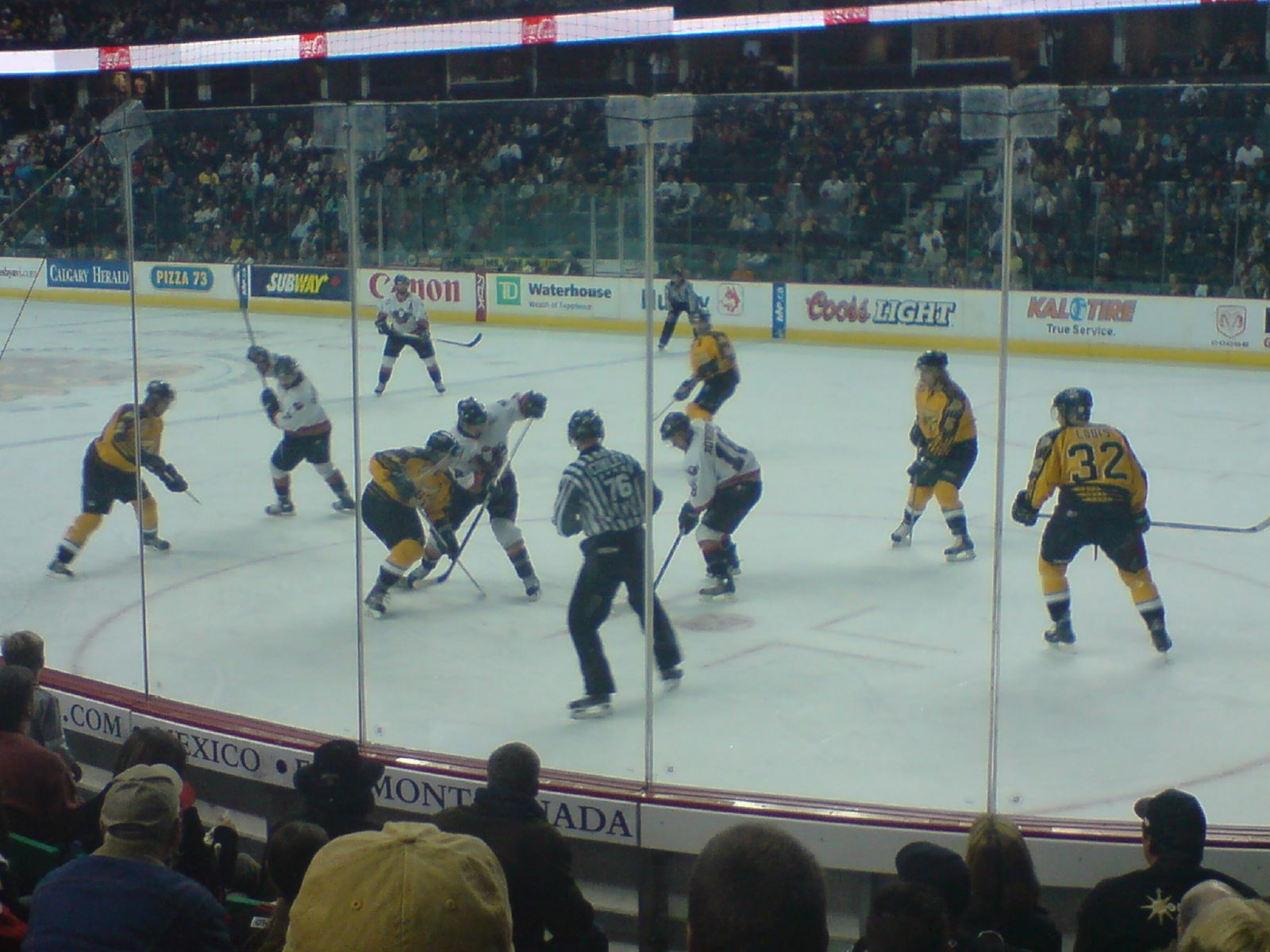
The Wheat Kings facing the Calgary Hitmen in the 2007 WHL playoffs.

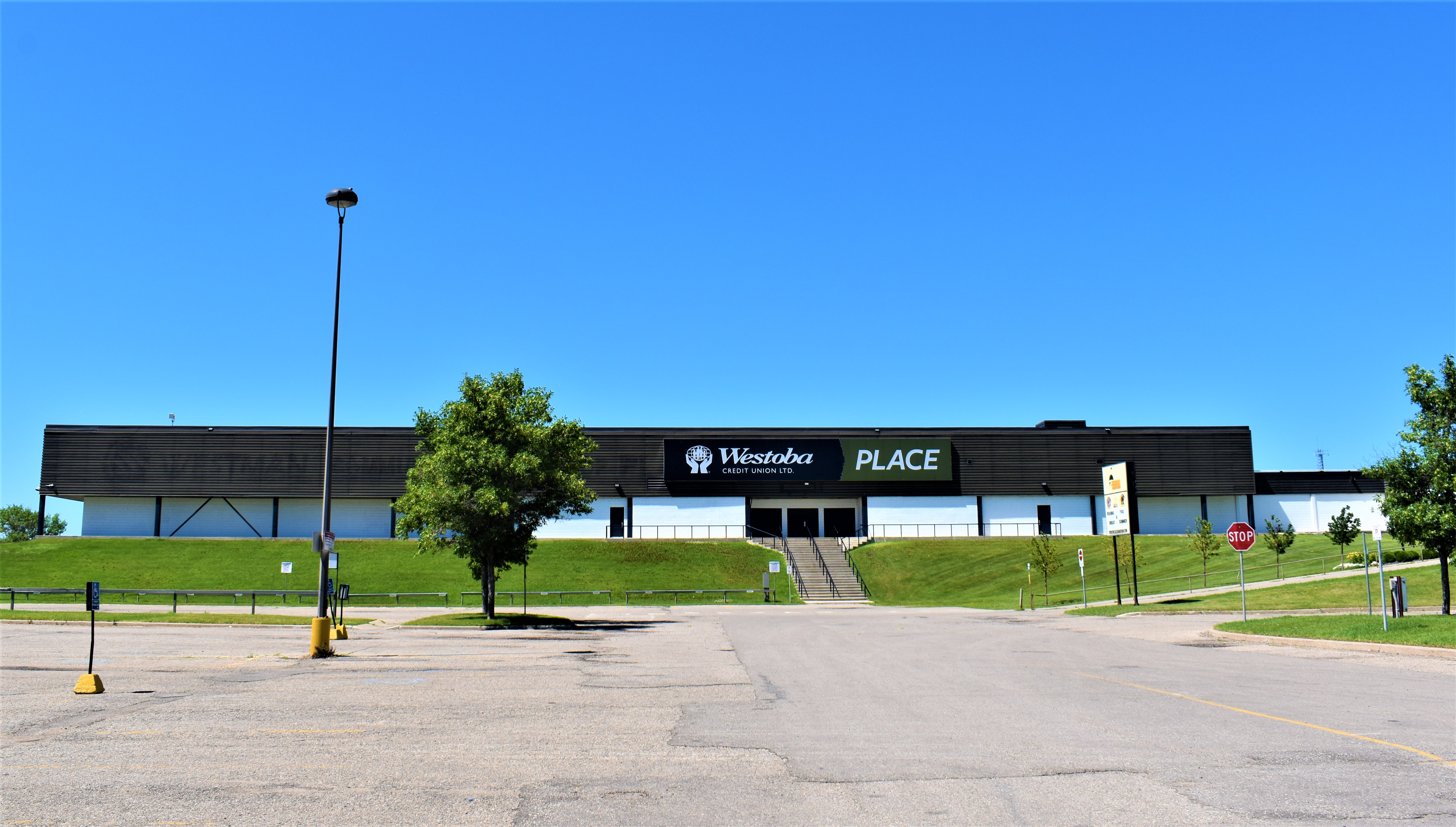
The Wheat Kings have played out of Keystone Centre—now Assiniboine Credit Union Place—since 1973.

Note: GP = Games played, W = Wins, L = Losses, T = Ties, OTL = Overtime losses, Pts = Points, GF = Goals for, GA = Goals against

Season	GP	W	L	T	OTL	GF	GA	Points	Finish	Playoffs
Manitoba Junior Hockey League
1936–37	15	10	3	2	—	74	32	22	4th MJHL	
1937–38	16	13	3	0	—	116	52	26	1st MJHL	
1938–39	18	14	4	0	—	102	60	28	1st MJHL	Won League
1939–40	24	10	10	4	—	99	95	24	4th MJHL	
1940–45	Leave due to World War II									
1945–46	10	7	2	1	—	102	35	15	2nd MJHL	
1946–47	16	13	2	1	—	122	50	27	1st MJHL	Won League
1947–48	24	15	9	0	—	115	99	30	2nd MJHL	
1948–49	30	27	3	0	—	172	72	54	1st MJHL	Won League, Won Abbott Cup; Lost Memorial Cup final
1949–50	36	27	9	0	—	181	113	54	1st MJHL	Won League
1950–51	36	26	8	2	—	231	123	54	1st MJHL	
1951–52	36	21	14	1	—	160	144	43	2nd MJHL	
1952–53	36	24	11	1	—	164	123	49	1st MJHL	
1953–54	36	13	22	1	—	132	151	27	2nd MJHL	
1954–58	Granted Leave									
1958–59	30	15	14	1	—	152	122	31	3rd MJHL	
1959–60	32	23	6	3	—	185	79	49	1st MJHL	Won League
1960–61	32	24	8	0	—	219	136	48	1st MJHL	
1961–62	40	26	12	2	—	238	137	54	1st MJHL	Won League
1962–63	39	32	7	0	—	206	124	64	1st MJHL	Won League
1963–64	30	27	1	2	—	209	67	56	1st MJHL	Won League
Saskatchewan Junior Hockey League
1964–65	56	30	21	5	—	230	216	65	3rd SJHL	
1965–66	60	32	21	7	—	283	262	71	3rd SJHL	
Manitoba Junior Hockey League
1966–67	57	47	9	1	—	416	178	95	2nd MJHL	Lost Final
Western Hockey League
1967–68	60	21	33	6	—	238	279	48	8th Overall	Lost quarterfinal
1968–69	60	18	40	2	—	224	350	38	4th East	Lost quarterfinal
1969–70	60	23	34	3	—	234	272	49	4th East	Lost quarterfinal
1970–71	66	20	46	0	—	247	387	40	5th East	Did not qualify
1971–72	68	35	33	0	—	338	331	70	3rd East	Lost semifinal
1972–73	68	29	30	9	—	307	304	67	4th East	Lost quarterfinal
1973–74	68	27	37	4	—	305	348	58	5th East	Did not qualify
1974–75	70	24	35	11	—	276	320	59	4th East	Lost quarterfinal
1975–76	72	34	30	8	—	341	303	76	2nd East	Lost quarterfinal
1976–77	72	54	10	8	—	447	242	116	1st East	Lost final
1977–78	72	46	12	14	—	424	299	106	1st East	Eliminated in divisional semifinal
1978–79	72	58	5	9	—	491	230	125	1st East	Won championship Lost Memorial Cup final
1979–80	72	33	37	2	—	319	343	68	5th East	Eliminated in East Division round robin
1980–81	72	29	40	3	—	342	352	61	6th East	Lost East Division quarterfinal
1981–82	72	34	38	0	—	372	413	68	5th East	Lost East Division quarterfinal
1982–83	72	21	51	0	—	327	460	42	7th East	Did not qualify
1983–84	72	44	26	2	—	463	246	90	3rd East	Lost East Division semifinal
1984–85	72	17	54	1	—	264	481	35	8th East	Did not qualify
1985–86	72	24	46	2	—	324	438	50	7th East	Did not qualify
1986–87	72	19	49	4	—	282	443	42	8th East	Did not qualify
1987–88	72	26	43	3	—	348	371	55	6th East	Lost East Division quarterfinal
1988–89	72	25	43	4	—	286	331	54	7th East	Did not qualify
1989–90	72	28	38	6	—	276	325	62	7th East	Did not qualify
1990–91	72	19	51	2	—	265	380	40	8th East	Did not qualify
1991–92	72	11	55	6	—	246	356	28	8th East	Did not qualify
1992–93	72	43	25	4	—	347	258	90	2nd East	Lost East Division quarterfinal
1993–94	72	42	25	5	—	291	251	89	2nd East	Lost East Division final
1994–95	72	45	22	5	—	315	235	95	1st East	Lost final
1995–96	72	52	19	1	—	369	231	105	1st East	Won championship
1996–97	72	47	24	1	—	339	208	95	1st East	Lost Eastern Conference quarterfinal
1997–98	72	45	21	6	—	322	235	96	3rd East	Lost final
1998–99	72	39	29	4	—	293	267	82	2nd East	Lost Eastern Conference quarterfinal
1999–2000	72	25	38	4	5	212	260	59	6th East	Did not qualify
2000–01	72	32	32	5	3	244	242	72	4th East	Lost Eastern Conference quarterfinal
2001–02	72	43	23	4	2	261	210	92	1st East	Lost Eastern Conference final
2002–03	72	43	17	9	3	258	187	98	1st East	Lost Eastern Conference final
2003–04	72	28	32	9	3	230	224	68	3rd East	Lost Eastern Conference semifinal
2004–05	72	45	21	5	1	255	199	96	1st East	Lost final
Season	GP	W	L	OTL	SOL	GF	GA	Points	Finish	Playoffs
2005–06	72	30	32	6	4	218	259	70	4th East	Lost Eastern Conference quarterfinal
2006–07	72	41	20	3	8	258	214	94	1st East	Lost Eastern Conference semifinal
2007–08	72	42	24	3	3	253	209	90	2nd East	Lost Eastern Conference quarterfinal
2008–09	72	48	19	3	2	295	220	101	2nd East	Lost Eastern Conference final
2009–10	72	50	18	1	3	321	204	104	1st East	Lost Eastern Conference final Lost Memorial Cup final
2010–11	72	32	31	1	8	281	275	73	3rd East	Lost Eastern Conference quarterfinal
2011–12	72	39	28	1	4	273	257	83	3rd East	Lost Eastern Conference semifinal
2012–13	72	24	40	4	4	189	284	56	6th East	Did not qualify
2013–14	72	34	29	6	3	271	269	77	3rd East	Lost Eastern Conference semifinal
2014–15	72	53	11	4	4	340	219	114	1st East	Lost final
2015–16	72	48	18	4	2	319	197	102	1st East	Won championship
2016–17	72	31	31	7	3	225	247	72	4th East	Lost Eastern Conference quarterfinal
2017–18	72	40	27	3	2	272	255	85	4th East	Lost Eastern Conference semifinal
2018–19	68	31	29	4	4	230	243	70	4th East	Did not qualify
2019–20	63	35	22	4	2	227	173	76	3rd East	Cancelled due to the COVID-19 pandemic
2020–21	24	18	4	2	0	104	61	38	1st East	No playoffs held due to COVID-19 pandemic
2021–22	68	35	28	3	2	218	242	75	4th East	Lost Eastern Conference quarterfinal
2022–23	68	26	33	8	1	212	242	61	5th East	Did not qualify
2023–24	68	33	28	6	1	225	244	73	3rd East	Lost Eastern Conference quarterfinal
2024–25	68	38	23	4	3	255	213	83	2nd East	Lost Eastern Conference quarterfinal
2025–26	68	40	23	2	0	269	241	82	2nd East	Lost Eastern Conference quarterfinal

== Championship history ==
- Abbott Cup: 1949
- Turnbull Cup (8): 1939, 1947, 1949, 1950, 1960, 1962, 1963, 1964
- Ed Chynoweth Cup (3): 1978–79, 1995–96, 2015–16
- Scotty Munro Memorial Trophy (5): 1976–77, 1977–78, 1978–79, 1995–96, 2014–15
- Conference Championship (5): 1995–96, 1997–98, 2004–05, 2014–15, 2015–16
- Regular season Division Championship (14): 1976–77, 1977–78, 1978–79, 1994–95, 1995–96, 1996–97, 2001–02, 2002–03, 2004–05, 2006–07, 2009–10, 2014–15, 2015–16, 2020–21

=== WHL Championship ===
- 1976–77: Loss, 1–4 vs New Westminster Bruins
- 1978–79: Win, 4–2 vs Portland Winter Hawks
- 1994–95: Loss, 2–4 vs Kamloops Blazers
- 1995–96: Win, 4–1 vs Spokane Chiefs
- 1997–98: Loss, 0–4 vs Portland Winter Hawks
- 2004–05: Loss, 1–4 vs Kelowna Rockets
- 2014–15: Loss, 0–4 vs Kelowna Rockets
- 2015–16: Win, 4–1 vs Seattle Thunderbirds

=== Memorial Cup Championship ===
- 1949: Loss, 3–4–1 vs Montreal Royals
- 1979: Loss, 1–2 (OT) vs Peterborough Petes
- 2010: Loss, 1–9 vs Windsor Spitfires

== Players ==
=== NHL alumni ===
- Jim Agnew
- Johnathan Aitken
- Ray Allison
- Keith Aulie
- Milan Bartovic
- Rick Blight
- Dan Bonar
- Jack Borotsik
- Laurie Boschman
- Aris Brimanis
- Cam Brown
- Sven Butenschon
- Dustin Byfuglien
- Matt Calvert
- Tony Camazzola
- Dave Chartier
- Jason Chimera
- Ron Chipperfield
- Erik Christensen
- Ryan Craig
- Butch Deadmarsh
- Bill Derlago
- Don Dietrich
- Chris Dingman
- Bill Fairbairn
- Eric Fehr
- Micheal Ferland
- Ray Ferraro
- Bob Fitchner
- Don Gillen
- Ridly Greig
- Travis Hamonic
- Glen Hanlon
- Josh Harding
- Burke Henry
- Wally Hergesheimer
- Ron Hextall
- Bruce Holloway
- Dean Kennedy
- Trevor Kidd
- Darin Kimble
- Rick Knickle
- Ladislav Kohn
- Mark Kolesar
- Justin Kurtz
- Gord Lane
- Kirby Law
- Derek Laxdal
- Peter Leboutillier
- Mike Leclerc
- Chuck Lefley
- Ron Loustel
- George Maneluk
- Mike Maneluk
- Bryan McCabe
- Brad McCrimmon
- Brett McLean
- Tom McMurchy
- Bill Mikkelson
- Carl Mokosak
- Jay More
- Marty Murray
- Jeff Odgers
- Chris Osgood
- John Paddock
- Jiri Patera
- Nolan Patrick
- Steve Patrick
- Cam Plante
- Walt Poddubny
- Brian Propp
- Ivan Provorov
- Ryan Pulock
- Wayne Ramsey
- Ryan Reaves
- Wade Redden
- Pokey Reddick
- Curt Ridley
- Terran Sandwith
- Peter Schaefer
- Braden Schneider
- Mark Stone
- Brayden Schenn
- Dave Semenko
- Brent Severyn
- Glen Sonmor
- Ryan Stewart
- Dave Thomlinson
- Logan Thompson
- Ole-Kristian Tollefsen
- Jordin Tootoo
- Oleg Tverdovsky
- Alexander Urbom
- Juha Widing
- Terry Yake
- Nolan Yonkman

=== Retired numbers ===
The Wheat Kings raised Brad McCrimmon's number to the rafters after he was killed in the Lokomotiv Yaroslavl plane crash in 2011.

#	Player
4	Brad McCrimmon

== Team records ==
Team records for a single season
Statistic	Total	Season
Most points	125	1978–79
Most wins	58	1978–79
Most goals for	491	1978–79
Fewest goals for	212	1999–00
Fewest goals against	187	2002–03
Most goals against	481	1984–85

Individual player records for a single season
Statistic	Player	Total	Season
Most goals	Ray Ferraro	108	1983–84
Most assists	Cam Plante	118	1983–84
Most points	Brian Propp	194	1978–79
Most points, defenceman	Cam Plante	140	1983–84
Most points, rookie	Brian Propp	135	1976–77
Best GAA (goalie)	Tyler Plante	2.58	2004–05
Goalies = minimum 1500 minutes played

Career records
Statistic	Player	Total	Career
Most goals	Ron Chipperfield	261	1970–1974
Most assists	Brian Propp	292	1976–1979
Most points	Brian Propp	511	1976–1979
Most penalty minutes	Randy Ponte	1,234	1998–2002
Most games played	Dwayne Gylywoychuk	323	1989–1994
Most games played (goalie)	Jordan Papirny	188	2013–2017
Most saves (goalie)	Glen Hanlon	5,232	1974–1977

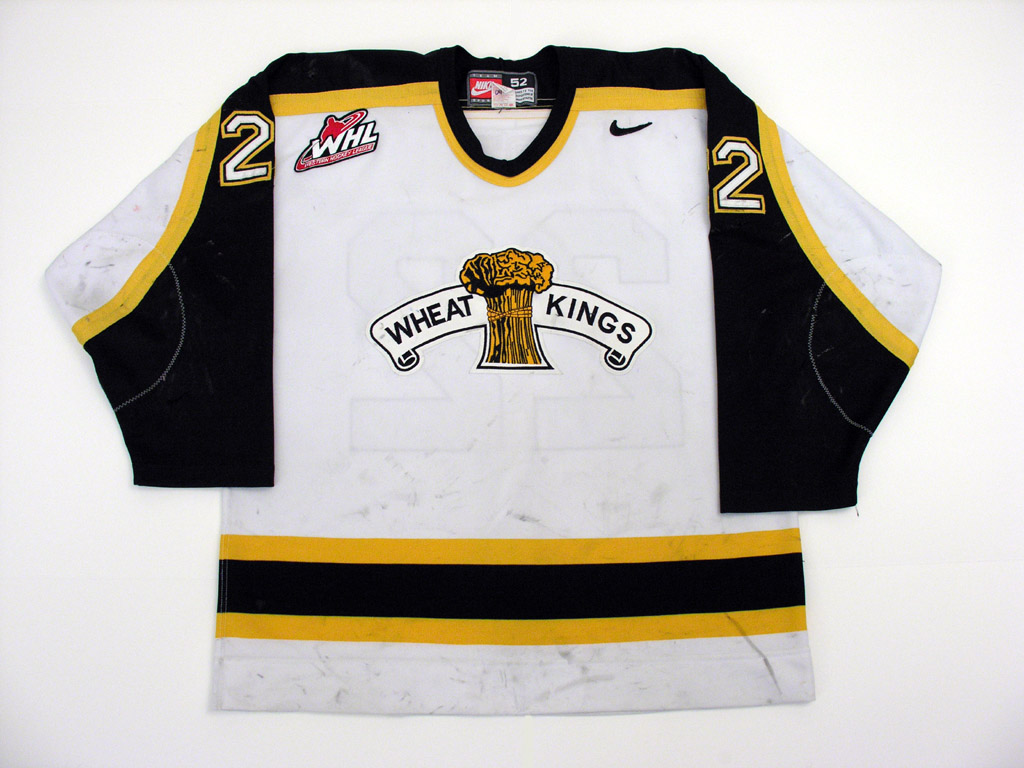
A Wheat Kings jersey c. 2005.

== Awards ==
Bob Clarke Trophy (WHL top scorer)

- Ron Chipperfield: 1973–74
- Bill Derlago: 1976–77
- Brian Propp: 1977–78
- Brian Propp: 1978–79
- Ray Ferraro: 1983–84
- Eric Fehr: 2004–05

Four Broncos Memorial Trophy (WHL player of the year)

- Ron Chipperfield: 1973–74
- Ray Ferraro: 1983–84
- Marty Murray: 1994–95
- Peter Schaefer: 1996–97
- Eric Fehr: 2004–05

Jim Piggott Memorial Trophy (WHL rookie of the year)

- Rick Blight: 1972–73
- Brian Propp: 1976–77
- Wade Redden: 1993–94
- Tyler Plante: 2004–05
- Brayden Schenn: 2007–08
- Nolan Patrick: 2014–15

Bill Hunter Memorial Trophy (WHL top defenceman)

- Brad McCrimmon: 1977–78
- Ivan Provorov: 2015–16
- Braeden Schneider: 2020–21

Del Wilson Trophy (WHL top goaltender)

- Glen Hanlon: 1976–77
- Rick Knickle: 1978–79
- Trevor Kidd: 1989–90
- Trevor Robins: 1992–93

Dunc McCallum Memorial Trophy (WHL coach of the year)

- Dunc McCallum (2): 1976–77, 1978–79
- Bob Lowes: 1995–96

Doc Seaman Trophy (WHL scholastic player of the year)

- Kevin Cheveldayoff: 1987–88
- Byron Penstock: 1993–94
- Stefan Cherneski: 1996–97
- Brett Dickie: 2002–03
- Keith Aulie: 2006–07
- Tanner Kaspick: 2015–16
- Quinn Mantei: 2022–23

WHL Playoff MVP (Awarded since 1992)

- Bobby Brown: 1995–96
- Nolan Patrick: 2015–16

Stafford Smythe Memorial Trophy (Memorial Cup MVP)

- Bart Hunter: 1979 Memorial Cup

Hap Emms Memorial Trophy (Memorial Cup top goaltender)

- Bart Hunter: 1979 Memorial Cup

George Parsons Trophy (Memorial Cup sportsmanship)

- Toni Rajala: 2010 Memorial Cup

== See also ==
- List of ice hockey teams in Manitoba
