= Canada national hockey team =

The Canada national hockey team may refer to:

- Canada men's national ball hockey team
- Canada women's national ball hockey team
- Canada men's national field hockey team
- Canada women's national field hockey team
- Canada national ringette team
- Canada men's national ice hockey team
  - Canada men's national junior ice hockey team
  - Canada men's national under-18 ice hockey team
- Canada women's national ice hockey team
  - Canada women's national under-18 ice hockey team
- Canada men's national ice sledge hockey team
- Canada women's national ice sledge hockey team
- Canada men's national inline hockey team
- Canada women's national inline hockey team
