= North Central Hockey League =

Senior ice hockey league

- Current season or competition: 2026–27
- Region: Alberta
- President: Trish Rizko
- Founded: 1995
- No. of teams: 9
- Recent champions: Wetaskiwin Longhorns (2026)
- Most successful club: Slave Lake Winterhawks
- Headquarters: Devon, Alberta
- Website: Official website

The North Central Senior Hockey League, also known as the North Central Hockey League (NCHL), is a senior 'AA' ice hockey league based in Alberta.

The NCHL was founded in 1995 with eight members, namely, the Athabasca Aces, Edson Ice, Fox Creek Bandits, Hinton Heat, Mayerthorpe Hitmen, Slave Lake Winterhawks, Swan Hills Knights and the Whitecourt Cats. The league was originally classified at the senior single 'A' level by Hockey Alberta, and was promoted to the 'AA' level in 2015.

The first NCHL president was George Vanberg, who served in the role from 1995–2006, and from 2009–2015. The NCHL championship trophy was renamed the Vanberg Cup in his honour in 2003.

== Membership ==
The league comprises 9 clubs as of the 2026–27 season.

Teams
Name	Hometown	Arena
Camrose Bruins	Camrose	Max McLean Arena
Drayton Valley Wildcats	Drayton Valley	Team Auctions Centre
Innisfail Eagles	Innisfail	Innisfail Twin Arena
Lacombe Generals	Lacombe	Gary Moe Auto Group Sportsplex
Millet Barons	Millet	Millet Agriplex
Stony Plain Eagles	Stony Plain	Glenn Hall Centennial Arena
Tofield Satellites	Tofield	Tofield Arena
Westlock Warriors	Westlock	Rotary Spirit Center
Wetaskiwin Longhorns	Wetaskiwin	Wetaskiwin Civic Centre

=== Former members ===
The following are former NCHL teams and their years of participation.

- Athabasca Aces (1994–1998)
- Athabasca Aces (2008–2014)
- Big Valley Oil Kings (2015–2016)
- Blackfalds Wranglers (2019–2020)
- Bonnyville Sr. Pontiacs (2015–2025)
- Camrose Crush (2021–2023)
- Daysland Northstars (2015–2020)
- Drayton Valley Wildcats (1997–1999)
- Drayton Valley Wildcats (2004–2014)
- Drayton Valley Wildcats (2015–2016)
- Eckville Eagles (2016–2019)
- Edson Ice (1994–2004)
- Edson Ice (2005–2017)
- Ft. Saskatchewan Chiefs (2019–2023)
- Fox Creek Bandits (1994–1999)
- Fox Creek Bandits (2000–2009)
- Grande Cache Rockies (1997–2000)
- Hinton Heat (1994–2013)
- Jasper Wolves (2003–2010)
- Lamont Bruins (2005–2009)
- Legal Vipers (2006–2012)
- Mayerthorpe Hitmen (1994–1997)
- Morinville Kings (2013–2026)
- Onoway Ice Dogs (2005–2011)
- Red Deer Rustlers (2018–2024)
- Rocky Rams (2010–2017)
- Slave Lake Winterhawks (1994–2012)
- Slave Lake Winterhawks (2013–2017)
- Swan Hills Knights (1994–1998)
- Sylvan Lake Pirates (2018–2019)
- Tofield Satellites (2015–2016)
- Westlock Wolfpack (1998–2000)
- Westlock Wolfpack (2005–2006)
- Whitecourt Cats (1994–2005)
- Whitecourt Wild (2013–2019)

== League championships ==
The league awards the Vanberg Cup annually to the league championship team. The President's Cup is awarded to the team with the most points during the regular season.

- 1996 - Hinton Heat
- 1997 - Slave Lake Winterhawks
- 1998 - Drayton Valley Wildcats
- 1999 - Drayton Valley Wildcats
- 2000 - Grande Cache Rockies
- 2001 - Hinton Heat
- 2002 - Slave Lake Winterhawks
- 2003 - Slave Lake Winterhawks
- 2004 - Slave Lake Winterhawks
- 2005 - Slave Lake Winterhawks
- 2006 - Slave Lake Winterhawks
- 2007 - Lamont Bruins
- 2008 - Lamont Bruins
- 2009 - Onoway Ice Dogs
- 2010 - Onoway Ice Dogs
- 2011 - Drayton Valley Wildcats
- 2012 - Drayton Valley Wildcats
- 2013 - Devon Barons
- 2014 - Devon Barons
- 2015 - Westlock Warriors
- 2016 - Daysland North Stars
- 2017 - Daysland North Stars
- 2018 - Daysland North Stars
- 2019 - Morinville Kings
- 2020 - Not awarded
- 2021 - Not awarded
- 2022 - Camrose Crush
- 2023 - Lacombe Generals
- 2024 - Lacombe Generals
- 2025 - Innisfail Eagles
- 2026 - Wetaskiwin Longhorns

== Sources ==
- Montgomery, Gord (15 November 2013). "Stony man takes over reins of Chinook Hockey League". Spruce Grove Examiner. Postmedia.
- Bachusky, Johnnie (23 May 2024). "Innisfail Eagles officially give up chance to host Allan Cup". The Albertan. Great West Media.
- Jean, Kristine (29 May 2024). "North Central Hockey League expanding to 10 teams". TownAndCountryToday.com. Great West Media.
- Bachusky, Johnnie (24 March 2025). "Innisfail Eagles are North Central Hockey League champions (6 photos)". Rocky Mountain Outlook. Great West Media.
- "Rustlers Fold Unexpectedly". North Central Senior Hockey League. 17 September 2024.
- Bachusky, Johnnie (30 April 2025). "Innisfail Eagles awarded during historic season-ending banquet". The Albertan. Great West Media.
- "Innisfail Eagles close out 2025–26 season with awards banquet". The Albertan. Great West Media. 27 April 2026.
- Bachusky, Johnnie (23 March 2026). "Innisfail Eagles swept in NCHL senior men's AA finals". Rocky Mountain Outlook. Great West Media.
- "League AGM, preseason & more". North Central Senior Hockey League. 14 September 2026.
- Hall, Josh (5 October 2026). "80th season underway for historic Innisfail Eagles franchise". rdnewsnow.com. Pattison Media.
- Singh, Manjot; Barrow, Tyler (14 October 2026). "Innisfail Eagles celebrate 80 years of senior hockey". CTVNews. Bell Media.
- Elsaadi, Lina (29 October 2026). "Innisfail hockey team hits 8 decades of uniting central Alberta town". CBC News. CBC/Radio-Canada.
