= 1996–97 WHL season =

Junior ice hockey season

- League: Western Hockey League
- Sport: Ice hockey
- Teams: 18

Regular season
- Scotty Munro Memorial Trophy: Lethbridge Hurricanes (1)
- Season MVP: Peter Schaefer (Brandon Wheat Kings)
- Top scorer: Todd Robinson (Portland Winter Hawks)

Playoffs
- Playoffs MVP: Blaine Russell (Hurricanes)
- Finals champions: Lethbridge Hurricanes (1)
- Runners-up: Seattle Thunderbirds

WHL seasons
- 1995–96 1997–98

1996-97 CHL season
- League: Canadian Hockey League
- Sport: Hockey
- Duration: QMJHL; Sept. 20, 1996 – Mar. 14, 1997; OHL; Sept. 1996 – Mar. 1997; WHL; Sept. 1996 – Mar. 1997
- Teams: 60
- Season MVP: Alyn McCauley (Ottawa 67's) (OHL)
- Top scorer: Pavel Rosa (Hull Olympiques) (QMJHL)

Memorial Cup
- Finals champions: Hull Olympiques (QMHL) (2nd title)
- Runners-up: Lethbridge Hurricanes (WHL)

The 1996–97 WHL season was the 31st season of the Western Hockey League (WHL), featuring eighteen teams and a 72-game regular season. The Lethbridge Hurricanes won both the Scotty Munro Memorial Trophy as regular season champions and the President's Cup as playoff champions, both for the first time in team history. The Hurricanes went on to finish as runners-up at the 1997 Memorial Cup tournament.

The Edmonton Ice joined the WHL as its eighteenth team, and the first to call Edmonton home since the second iteration of the Oil Kings left the city in 1979.

== League notes ==
- The addition of the Edmonton Ice to the Central Division precipitated a realignment for the Swift Current Broncos, who moved to the East Division.

== Regular season ==
=== Final standings ===
East Division
Pos	Team	Pld	W	L	T	GF	GA	Pts
1	x – Brandon Wheat Kings	72	47	24	1	339	208	95
2	x – Swift Current Broncos	72	44	23	5	336	243	93
3	x – Regina Pats	72	42	27	3	326	259	87
4	x – Moose Jaw Warriors	72	36	29	7	278	240	79
5	x – Prince Albert Raiders	72	29	34	9	235	262	67
6	Saskatoon Blades	72	18	48	6	227	344	42

x – qualified for playoffs

Central Division
Pos	Team	Pld	W	L	T	GF	GA	Pts
1	x – Lethbridge Hurricanes	72	47	22	3	342	248	97
2	x – Red Deer Rebels	72	43	26	3	317	297	89
3	x – Medicine Hat Tigers	72	39	32	1	270	278	79
4	Calgary Hitmen	72	15	53	4	199	360	34
5	Edmonton Ice	72	14	56	2	231	395	30

x – qualified for playoffs

West Division
Pos	Team	Pld	W	L	T	GF	GA	Pts
1	x – Portland Winter Hawks	72	46	21	5	300	196	97
2	x – Seattle Thunderbirds	72	41	27	4	311	249	86
3	x – Spokane Chiefs	72	35	33	4	260	235	74
4	x – Kelowna Rockets	72	35	35	2	298	314	72
5	x – Kamloops Blazers	72	28	37	7	256	285	63
6	x – Prince George Cougars	72	28	39	5	238	287	61
7	Tri-City Americans	72	22	43	7	225	288	51

x – qualified for playoffs

=== Scoring leaders ===
Note: GP = Games played; G = Goals; A = Assists; Pts = Points; PIM = Penalties in minutes

Player	Team	GP	G	A	Pts	PIM
Todd Robinson	Portland Winter Hawks	71	38	96	134	53
Byron Ritchie	Lethbridge Hurricanes	63	50	76	126	86
Patrick Marleau	Seattle Thunderbirds	71	51	74	125	22
Peter Schaefer	Brandon Wheat Kings	61	49	74	123	66
B.J. Young	Red Deer Rebels	63	58	56	114	72
Josh St. Louis	Swift Current Broncos	65	57	51	108	20
Brett McLean	Kelowna Rockets	72	44	60	104	89
Kelly Smart	Brandon Wheat Kings	69	39	60	99	8
Josh Holden	Regina Pats	58	49	49	98	111
Greg Schmidt	Red Deer Rebels	66	45	53	98	97

=== Goaltending leaders ===
Note: GP = Games played; Min = Minutes played; W = Wins; L = Losses; T = Ties; GA = Goals against; SO = Total shutouts; SV% = Save percentage; GAA = Goals against average

Player	Team	GP	Min	W	L	T	GA	SO	SV%	GAA
Brian Elder	Brandon Wheat Kings	52	2930	32	15	0	132	2	.906	2.70
Brent Belecki	Portland Winter Hawks	27	1568	17	7	1	71	1	.909	2.72
Chris Wickenheiser	Red Deer/Portland	41	2428	24	14	3	110	3	.913	2.72
David Haun	Brandon Wheat Kings	27	1442	15	9	1	72	1	.898	3.00
Donavon Nunweiler	Moose Jaw Warriors	56	3278	27	21	5	166	6	.907	3.04

== 1997 WHL Playoffs ==
- Top eight teams in the Eastern Conference (East and Central divisions) qualified for playoffs
- Top six teams in the Western Conference (division) qualified for the playoffs

First Round
C1	Lethbridge	4
E5	Prince Albert	0
E1	Brandon	2
E4	Moose Jaw	4
E2	Swift Current	4
C3	Medicine Hat	0
C2	Red Deer	4
E3	Regina	1
W2	Seattle	4
W5	Kamloops	1
W1	Portland	2
W6	Prince George	4
W3	Spokane	4
W4	Kelowna	2

Division Semi-Finals
C1	Lethbridge	4
E4	Moose Jaw	2
E2	Swift Current	2
C2	Red Deer	4
W2	Seattle	bye
W3	Spokane	0
W6	Prince George	3

Division Finals
C1	Lethbridge	4
C2	Red Deer	1
W2	Seattle	4
W6	Prince George	2

WHL Championship
C1	Lethbridge	4
W2	Seattle	0

=== Conference Quarterfinals ===
==== Eastern Conference ====
Lethbridge vs. Prince Albert
Date	Away	Home
March 19	Prince Albert 2	4 Lethbridge
March 21	Prince Albert 1	2 Lethbridge
March 23	Lethbridge 5	4 Prince Albert
March 24	Lethbridge 5	4 Prince Albert
Lethbridge wins series 4–0

Brandon vs. Moose Jaw
Date	Away	Home	
March 20	Moose Jaw 4	2 Brandon	
March 21	Moose Jaw 4	3 Brandon	
March 23	Brandon 5	4 Moose Jaw	
March 24	Brandon 3	2 Moose Jaw	
March 26	Moose Jaw 3	2 Brandon	OT
March 28	Brandon 2	3 Moose Jaw	OT
Moose Jaw wins series 4–2

Swift Current vs. Medicine Hat
Date	Away	Home
March 18	Medicine Hat 1	8 Swift Current
March 20	Swift Current 5	1 Medicine Hat
March 22	Medicine Hat 1	5 Swift Current
March 23	Swift Current 4	2 Medicine Hat
Swift Current wins series 4–0

Red Deer vs. Regina
Date	Away	Home	
March 20	Regina 4	6 Red Deer	
March 21	Regina 4	5 Red Deer	OT
March 23	Red Deer 6	2 Regina	
March 24	Red Deer 1	5 Regina	
March 26	Regina 1	5 Red Deer	
Red Deer wins series 4–1

==== Western Conference ====
Portland vs. Prince George
Date	Away	Home
March 21	Prince George 2	5 Portland
March 22	Prince George 5	3 Portland
March 25	Portland 0	4 Prince George
March 26	Portland 2	4 Prince George
March 29	Prince George 1	2 Portland
March 31	Portland 2	3 Prince George
Prince George wins series 4–2

Spokane vs. Kelowna
Date	Away	Home
March 21	Spokane 5	3 Kelowna
March 22	Spokane 5	3 Kelowna
March 26	Kelowna 5	2 Spokane
March 28	Kelowna 0	4 Spokane
March 29	Kelowna 6	3 Spokane
March 31	Spokane 5	2 Kelowna
Spokane wins series 4–2

Seattle vs. Kamloops
Date	Away	Home
March 21	Kamloops 2	5 Seattle
March 23	Kamloops 3	7 Seattle
March 25	Seattle 4	1 Kamloops
March 27	Seattle 2	3 Kamloops
March 29	Kamloops 4	5 Seattle
Seattle wins series 4–1

=== Conference semifinals ===
Eastern Conference

Lethbridge vs. Moose Jaw
Date	Away	Home	
March 31	Moose Jaw 2	3 Lethbridge	OT
April 1	Moose Jaw 5	4 Lethbridge	OT
April 3	Lethbridge 5	3 Moose Jaw	
April 4	Lethbridge 4	5 Moose Jaw	
April 6	Moose Jaw 1	5 Lethbridge	
April 8	Lethbridge 5	4 Moose Jaw	
Lethbridge wins series 4–2

Swift Current vs. Red Deer
Date	Away	Home	
March 31	Red Deer 5	2 Swift Current	
April 1	Red Deer 5	3 Swift Current	
April 3	Swift Current 2	4 Red Deer	
April 4	Swift Current 3	2 Red Deer	OT
April 6	Red Deer 2	11 Swift Current	
April 8	Swift Current 2	6 Red Deer	
Red Deer wins series 4–2

Western Conference

Spokane vs. Prince George
Date	Away	Home	
April 4	Prince George 5	4 Spokane	OT
April 5	Prince George 4	2 Spokane	
April 7	Spokane 1	2 Prince George	
Prince George wins series 3–0

Seattle earns bye

=== Conference finals ===
Eastern Conference

Lethbridge vs. Red Deer
Date	Away	Home	
April 12	Red Deer 2	3 Lethbridge	OT
April 13	Red Deer 7	4 Lethbridge	
April 15	Lethbridge 5	3 Red Deer	
April 16	Lethbridge 6	4 Red Deer	
April 18	Red Deer 2	5 Lethbridge	
Lethbridge wins series 4–1

Western Conference

Seattle vs. Prince George
Date	Away	Home	
April 10	Prince George 3	2 Seattle	2OT
April 11	Prince George 1	4 Seattle	
April 14	Seattle 5	2 Prince George	
April 15	Seattle 3	4 Prince George	
April 18	Prince George 1	4 Seattle	
April 20	Seattle 6	1 Prince George	
Seattle wins series 4–2

=== WHL Championship ===
Lethbridge vs. Seattle
Date	Away	Home
April 25	Seattle 2	7 Lethbridge
April 26	Seattle 1	4 Lethbridge
April 29	Lethbridge 3	1 Seattle
April 30	Lethbridge 5	1 Seattle
Lethbridge wins series 4–0

== All-Star game ==
On January 22, the Western Conference defeated the Eastern Conference 7–5 at Spokane, Washington before a WHL record crowd of 10,455.

== WHL awards ==
Player of the Year - Four Broncos Memorial Trophy: Peter Schaefer, Brandon Wheat Kings
Scholastic Player of the Year - Daryl K. (Doc) Seaman Trophy: Stefan Cherneski, Brandon Wheat Kings
Top Scorer - Bob Clarke Trophy: Todd Robinson, Portland Winter Hawks
Most Sportsmanlike Player - Brad Hornung Trophy: Kelly Smart, Brandon Wheat Kings
Top Defenseman - Bill Hunter Trophy: Chris Phillips, Lethbridge Hurricanes
Rookie of the Year - Jim Piggott Memorial Trophy: Donavon Nunweiler, Moose Jaw Warriors
Top Goaltender - Del Wilson Trophy: Brian Boucher, Tri-City Americans
Coach of the Year - Dunc McCallum Memorial Trophy: Brent Peterson, Portland Winter Hawks
Executive of the Year - Lloyd Saunders Memorial Trophy: Todd McLellan, Swift Current Broncos
Regular season Champions - Scotty Munro Memorial Trophy: Lethbridge Hurricanes
Top Official - Allen Paradice Memorial Trophy: Tom Kowal
Marketing/Public Relations Award - St. Clair Group Trophy: Pat Garrity, Red Deer Rebels
WHL Humanitarian of the Year: Jesse Wallin, Red Deer Rebels
WHL Plus-Minus Award: Peter Schaefer, Brandon Wheat Kings
WHL Playoff Most Valuable Player: Blaine Russell, Lethbridge Hurricanes

== All-Star teams ==
Eastern Conference
	First Team		Second Team	
Goal	Donovan Nunweiler	Moose Jaw Warriors	Brian Elder	Brandon Wheat Kings
Defense	Chris Phillips	Lethbridge Hurricanes	Justin Kurtz	Brandon Wheat Kings
Defense	Derek Morris	Regina Pats	David Van Drunen	Prince Albert Raiders
Forward	Peter Schaefer	Brandon Wheat Kings	Brad Larsen	Swift Current Broncos
Forward	Shane Willis	Lethbridge Hurricanes	Dmitri Nabokov	Regina Pats
Forward	B.J. Young	Red Deer Rebels	Byron Ritchie	Lethbridge Hurricanes
Western Conference
	First Team		Second Team	
Goal	Brian Boucher	Tri-City Americans	Chris Wickenheiser	Portland Winter Hawks
Defense	Randy Perry	Seattle Thunderbirds	Hugh Hamilton	Spokane Chiefs
Defense	Zenith Komarniski	Tri-City Americans	Joel Kwiatkowski	Prince George Cougars
Forward	Patrick Marleau	Seattle Thunderbirds	Brad Isbister	Portland Winter Hawks
Forward	Todd Robinson	Portland Winter Hawks	Donnie Kinney	Kamloops Blazers
Forward	Trent Whitfield	Spokane Chiefs	Brett McLean	Kelowna Rockets

== See also ==
- 1997 NHL entry draft
- 1996 in sports
- 1997 in sports

Preceded by 1995–96 WHL season	WHL seasons	Succeeded by 1997–98 WHL season
