= Wheat City Arena =

Indoor arena located in Brandon, Manitoba

Coordinates: 49.8419°N 99.9517°W

The Wheat City Arena was an indoor arena located in Brandon, Manitoba at the corner of 10th Street and Victoria Avenue. It was built in 1913 and hosted the Royal Manitoba Winter Fair as well as numerous ice hockey teams, including the Brandon Wheat Kings of the MJHL, SJHL, and Western Hockey League. It was demolished in 1969 and replaced with a Safeway store that has since closed and been replaced by the new headquarters for the City of Brandon Police.
