= 1995–96 WHL season =

Junior ice hockey season

- League: Western Hockey League
- Sport: Ice hockey
- Teams: 17

Regular season
- Scotty Munro Memorial Trophy: Brandon Wheat Kings (4)
- Season MVP: Jarome Iginla (Kamloops Blazers)
- Top scorer: Mark Deyell (Saskatoon Blades)

Playoffs
- Playoffs MVP: Bobby Brown (Wheat Kings)
- Finals champions: Brandon Wheat Kings (2)
- Runners-up: Spokane Chiefs

WHL seasons
- 1994–95 1996–97

1995–96 CHL season
- League: Canadian Hockey League
- Sport: Ice hockey
- Teams: 48

OHL

QMJHL

WHL

Memorial Cup
- Finals champions: Granby Prédateurs (QMJHL) (1st title)
- Runners-up: Peterborough Petes (OHL)

The 1995–96 WHL season was the 30th season of the Western Hockey League (WHL), featuring seventeen teams and a 72-game regular season. The Brandon Wheat Kings won the franchise's fourth Scotty Munro Memorial Trophy for posting the best regular season record, and followed this up in the playoffs by securing their second President's Cup as league champions, their first since 1978–79.

The Calgary Hitmen joined the WHL as its seventeenth franchise, and the first to be located in Calgary since the Calgary Wranglers in 1987. The Tacoma Rockets relocated to Kelowna, British Columbia and became the Kelowna Rockets.

== League notes ==
- Following the addition of the Calgary Hitmen and the relocation of the Rockets to Kelowna, the WHL divided into three divisions: The East and Central Divisions formed the Eastern Conference, consisting of five teams per division. The West Division was made up of the seven B.C. and U.S.-based teams.
- The playoff format was changed so that the top eight teams in the Eastern Conference and the top six in the West Division qualified. The 14 playoff qualifiers all played best-of-seven series in the first round. The East semifinals were best-of-seven affairs, while the highest remaining seed in the West earned a bye. The remaining two West teams played a best-of-five series. Conference and League final series remained best-of-seven.
- The Spokane Chiefs became the first team in WHL history to win a seven-game playoff series after being down 3 games to 0, against the Portland Winter Hawks in the first round of the West Division playoffs.

== Regular season ==
=== Final standings ===
East Division
Pos	Team	Pld	W	L	T	GF	GA	Pts
1	x – Brandon Wheat Kings	72	52	19	1	369	231	105
2	x – Prince Albert Raiders	72	47	19	6	309	250	100
3	x – Regina Pats	72	37	33	2	316	284	76
4	x – Saskatoon Blades	72	29	42	1	314	351	59
5	Moose Jaw Warriors	72	18	49	5	223	331	41

x – qualified for playoffs

Central Division
Pos	Team	Pld	W	L	T	GF	GA	Pts
1	x – Swift Current Broncos	72	36	31	5	285	271	77
2	x – Lethbridge Hurricanes	72	33	36	3	259	270	69
3	x – Medicine Hat Tigers	72	30	37	5	243	288	65
4	x – Red Deer Rebels	72	28	39	5	263	300	61
5	Calgary Hitmen	72	18	51	3	222	359	39

x – qualified for playoffs

West Division
Pos	Team	Pld	W	L	T	GF	GA	Pts
1	x – Spokane Chiefs	72	50	18	4	322	221	104
2	x – Kamloops Blazers	72	48	22	2	343	257	98
3	x – Tri-City Americans	72	45	25	2	336	255	92
4	x – Kelowna Rockets	72	35	33	4	338	309	74
5	x – Seattle Thunderbirds	72	29	36	7	255	281	65
6	x – Portland Winter Hawks	72	30	39	3	283	301	63
7	Prince George Cougars	72	17	53	2	219	340	36

x – qualified for playoffs

=== Scoring leaders ===
Note: GP = Games played; G = Goals; A = Assists; Pts = Points; PIM = Penalties in minutes

Player	Team	GP	G	A	Pts	PIM
Mark Deyell	Saskatoon Blades	69	61	98	159	122
Frank Banham	Saskatoon Blades	72	83	69	152	116
Hnat Domenichelli	Kamloops Blazers	62	59	89	148	37
Jarome Iginla	Kamloops Blazers	63	63	73	136	120
Robb Gordon	Kelowna Rockets	58	51	63	114	84
Josh Holden	Regina Pats	70	57	55	112	105
Mike Leclerc	Brandon Wheat Kings	71	58	53	111	161
Clarke Wilm	Saskatoon Blades	72	49	61	110	83
Peter Schaefer	Brandon Wheat Kings	69	47	61	108	53
Marty Flichel	Kelowna Rockets	69	28	79	107	107

== 1996 WHL Playoffs ==
First round
E1	Brandon	4
E4	Saskatoon	0
C1	Swift Current	2
C4	Red Deer	4
E2	Prince Albert	4
C3	Medicine Hat	1
E3	Regina	4
C2	Lethbridge	0
W1	Spokane	4
W6	Portland	3
W2	Kamloops	4
W5	Seattle	1
W3	Tri-City	4
W4	Kelowna	2

Division Semi-Finals
E1	Brandon	4
C4	Red Deer	0
E2	Prince Albert	4
E3	Regina	3
W1	Spokane	bye
W2	Kamloops	3
W3	Tri-City	2

Division Finals
E1	Brandon	4
E2	Prince Albert	2
W1	Spokane	4
W2	Kamloops	2

WHL Championship
E1	Brandon	4
W1	Spokane	1

== All-Star game ==
On January 23, the Eastern Conference defeated the Western Conference 10–7 at Prince George, British Columbia before a crowd of 5,992.

== Awards ==
Player of the Year - Four Broncos Memorial Trophy: Jarome Iginla, Kamloops Blazers
Scholastic Player of the Year - Daryl K. (Doc) Seaman Trophy: Bryce Salvador, Lethbridge Hurricanes
Top Scorer - Bob Clarke Trophy: Mark Deyell, Saskatoon Blades
Most Sportsmanlike Player - Brad Hornung Trophy: Hnat Domenichelli, Kamloops Blazers
Top Defenseman - Bill Hunter Trophy: Nolan Baumgartner, Kamloops Blazers
Rookie of the Year - Jim Piggott Memorial Trophy: Chris Phillips, Prince Albert Raiders
Top Goaltender - Del Wilson Trophy: David Lemamowicz, Spokane Chiefs
Coach of the Year - Dunc McCallum Memorial Trophy: Bob Lowes, Brandon Wheat Kings
Executive of the Year - Lloyd Saunders Memorial Trophy: Tim Speltz, Spokane Chiefs
Regular season champions - Scotty Munro Memorial Trophy: Brandon Wheat Kings
Top Official - Allen Paradice Memorial Trophy: Lonnie Cameron
Marketing/Public Relations Award - St. Clair Group Trophy: Dave Pier, Spokane Chiefs
WHL Humanitarian of the Year: Darryl Laplante, Moose Jaw Warriors
WHL Plus-Minus Award: Hugh Hamilton, Spokane Chiefs
WHL Playoff Most Valuable Player: Bobby Brown, Brandon Wheat Kings

== All-Star teams ==
Eastern Conference
	First Team		Second Team	
Goal	Chad Mercier	Regina Pats	Terry Friesen	Swift Current Broncos
Defense	Wade Redden	Brandon Wheat Kings	Chad Allan	Saskatoon Blades
Defense	Craig Millar	Swift Current Broncos	Justin Kurtz	Brandon Wheat Kings
Forward	Frank Banham	Saskatoon Blades	Curtis Brown	Prince Albert Raiders
Forward	Mark Deyell	Saskatoon Blades	Mike Leclerc	Brandon Wheat Kings
Forward	Peter Schaefer	Brandon Wheat Kings	Byron Ritchie	Lethbridge Hurricanes
Western Conference
	First Team		Second Team	
Goal	David Lemanowicz	Spokane Chiefs	Brian Boucher	Tri-City Americans
Defense	Nolan Baumgartner	Kamloops Blazers	Sean Gillam	Spokane Chiefs
Defense	Jason Holland	Kamloops Blazers	Sheldon Souray	Kelowna Rockets
Forward	Jarome Iginla	Kamloops Blazers	Daymond Langkow	Tri-City Americans
Forward	Hnat Domenichelli	Kamloops Blazers	Jaroslav Svejkovsky	Tri-City Americans
Forward	Robb Gordon	Kelowna Rockets	Jason Podollan (tied)	Spokane Chiefs
Forward	-		Richard Zedník (tied)	Portland Winter Hawks

== See also ==
- 1996 Memorial Cup
- 1996 NHL entry draft
- 1995 in sports
- 1996 in sports

Preceded by 1994–95 WHL season	WHL seasons	Succeeded by 1996–97 WHL season
