= Jamie Pushor =

Canadian ice hockey player (born 1973)

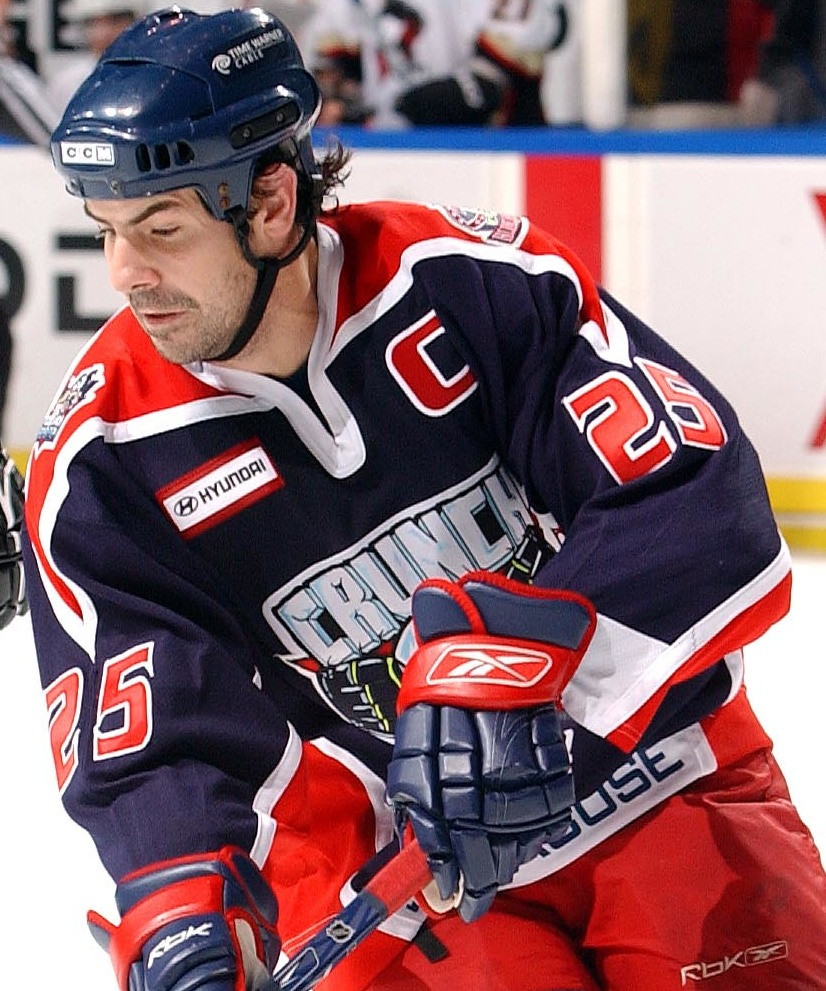
- Pushor with the Syracuse Crunch in 2005
- Born: February 11, 1973 (age 53) Lethbridge, Alberta, Canada
- Height: 6 ft 3 in (191 cm)
- Weight: 218 lb (99 kg; 15 st 8 lb)
- Position: Defence
- Shot: Right
- Played for: Detroit Red Wings; Mighty Ducks of Anaheim; Dallas Stars; Columbus Blue Jackets; Pittsburgh Penguins; New York Rangers
- NHL draft: 32nd overall, 1991; Detroit Red Wings
- Playing career: 1993–2007

James Michael Pushor (born February 11, 1973) is a Canadian former professional ice hockey player. He is currently director of player personnel with the Tampa Bay Lightning of the National Hockey League (NHL).

Pushor was drafted 32nd overall in the second round of the 1991 NHL entry draft by the Detroit Red Wings. He played in the NHL for the Red Wings, Mighty Ducks of Anaheim, Dallas Stars, Columbus Blue Jackets, Pittsburgh Penguins and New York Rangers. He has won three Stanley Cup championships, in 1997 with the Red Wings as a player and in 2020, and 2021 with the Lightning as an executive.

As a free agent (previously playing for the Columbus Blue Jackets), Pushor was acquired by the Toronto Maple Leafs in 2003 on a try-out contract in the off-season. He failed to make the cut for the team on the try-out contract.

Pushor retired during the 2006–07 campaign, after abruptly leaving the Syracuse Crunch mid-season.

== Career statistics ==
=== Regular season and playoffs ===
			Regular season					Playoffs
Season	Team	League	GP	G	A	Pts	PIM	GP	G	A	Pts	PIM
1988–89	Lethbridge Y's Men U18 AAA	AEL U18	37	1	8	9	20	—	—	—	—	—
1988–89	Lethbridge Hurricanes	WHL	2	0	0	0	0	—	—	—	—	—
1989–90	Lethbridge Y's Men U18 AAA	AEL U18	35	6	27	33	92	—	—	—	—	—
1989–90	Lethbridge Hurricanes	WHL	10	0	2	2	2	16	0	0	0	63
1990–91	Lethbridge Hurricanes	WHL	71	1	13	14	193	—	—	—	—	—
1991–92	Lethbridge Hurricanes	WHL	49	2	15	17	232	5	0	0	0	33
1992–93	Lethbridge Hurricanes	WHL	72	6	22	28	200	4	0	1	1	9
1993–94	Adirondack Red Wings	AHL	73	1	17	18	124	12	0	0	0	22
1994–95	Adirondack Red Wings	AHL	58	2	11	13	129	4	0	1	1	0
1995–96	Adirondack Red Wings	AHL	65	2	16	18	126	3	0	0	0	5
1995–96	Detroit Red Wings	NHL	5	0	1	1	17	—	—	—	—	—
1996–97	Detroit Red Wings	NHL	75	4	7	11	129	5	0	1	1	5
1997–98	Detroit Red Wings	NHL	54	2	5	7	71	—	—	—	—	—
1997–98	Mighty Ducks of Anaheim	NHL	10	0	2	2	10	—	—	—	—	—
1998–99	Mighty Ducks of Anaheim	NHL	70	1	2	3	112	4	0	0	0	6
1999–00	Dallas Stars	NHL	62	0	8	8	53	5	0	0	0	5
2000–01	Columbus Blue Jackets	NHL	75	3	10	13	94	—	—	—	—	—
2001–02	Columbus Blue Jackets	NHL	61	0	6	6	54	—	—	—	—	—
2001–02	Pittsburgh Penguins	NHL	15	0	2	2	30	—	—	—	—	—
2002–03	Pittsburgh Penguins	NHL	76	3	1	4	76	—	—	—	—	—
2003–04	Syracuse Crunch	AHL	17	1	4	5	24	—	—	—	—	—
2003–04	Columbus Blue Jackets	NHL	7	0	0	0	2	—	—	—	—	—
2003–04	New York Rangers	NHL	7	0	0	0	0	—	—	—	—	—
2003–04	Hartford Wolf Pack	AHL	14	0	2	2	21	16	1	1	2	18
2004–05	Syracuse Crunch	AHL	68	1	9	10	85	—	—	—	—	—
2005–06	Syracuse Crunch	AHL	72	5	17	22	132	6	0	1	1	9
2005–06	Columbus Blue Jackets	NHL	4	1	2	3	0	—	—	—	—	—
2006–07	Syracuse Crunch	AHL	37	2	9	11	63	—	—	—	—	—
AHL totals			404	14	85	99	704	41	1	3	4	54
NHL totals			521	14	46	60	648	14	0	1	1	16

== Awards ==
- 1993 - WHL Humanitarian of the Year Award

Preceded by new creation	Winner of the WHL Humanitarian of the Year Award; 1993	Succeeded by Jason Widmer
