= Terry Hollinger =

Canadian ice hockey player

Terry J. Hollinger
- Born: February 24, 1971 (age 54); Regina, Saskatchewan), Canada
- Height: 188 cm (6 ft 2 in)
- Weight: 98 kg (216 lb; 15 st 6 lb)
- Position: Defence
- Shot: Left
- Played for: St. Louis Blues; Iserlohn Roosters; HC Milano
- NHL draft: 153th overall, 1991; St. Louis Blues
- Playing career: 1987–2005

Terry J. Hollinger (born February 24, 1971, in Regina, Saskatchewan) is a Canadian retired professional ice hockey player who played seven games in the National Hockey League for the St. Louis Blues.

== Career statistics ==
			Regular season					Playoffs
Season	Team	League	GP	G	A	Pts	PIM	GP	G	A	Pts	PIM
1987–88	Regina Pats	WHL	7	1	1	2	4	—	—	—	—	—
1988–89	Regina Pats	WHL	65	2	27	29	49	—	—	—	—	—
1989–90	Regina Pats	WHL	70	14	43	57	40	11	1	3	4	10
1990–91	Regina Pats	WHL	8	1	6	7	6	—	—	—	—	—
1990–91	Lethbridge Hurricanes	WHL	62	9	32	41	113	16	3	14	17	22
1991–92	Lethbridge Hurricanes	WHL	65	23	62	85	155	5	1	2	3	13
1991–92	Peoria Rivermen	IHL	1	0	2	2	0	5	0	1	1	0
1992–93	Peoria Rivermen	IHL	72	2	28	30	67	4	1	1	2	0
1993–94	St. Louis Blues	NHL	2	0	0	0	0	—	—	—	—	—
1993–94	Peoria Rivermen	IHL	78	12	31	43	96	6	0	3	3	31
1994–95	St. Louis Blues	NHL	5	0	0	0	2	—	—	—	—	—
1994–95	Peoria Rivermen	IHL	69	7	25	32	137	4	2	4	6	8
1995–96	Rochester Americans	AHL	62	5	50	55	71	19	3	11	14	12
1996–97	Rochester Americans	AHL	73	12	51	63	54	10	2	7	9	27
1997–98	Worcester IceCats	AHL	55	8	24	32	34	—	—	—	—	—
1997–98	Houston Aeros	IHL	8	1	1	2	6	4	1	2	3	11
1998–99	Utah Grizzlies	IHL	58	4	19	23	40	—	—	—	—	—
1998–99	Orlando Solar Bears	IHL	21	9	9	18	18	17	3	5	8	14
1999–00	Orlando Solar Bears	IHL	20	4	4	8	13	—	—	—	—	—
1999–00	Manitoba Moose	IHL	18	3	10	13	4	—	—	—	—	—
1999–00	Providence Bruins	AHL	4	0	3	3	2	10	1	4	5	6
2000–01	Providence Bruins	AHL	70	8	14	22	73	17	2	5	7	24
2001–02	Iserlohn Roosters	DEL	58	4	31	35	46	—	—	—	—	—
2002–03	Milano Vipers	Italy	15	1	10	11	18	9	3	3	6	6
2003–04	Quad City Mallards	UHL	52	4	32	36	21	2	1	1	2	0
2004–05	Quad City Mallards	UHL	71	11	37	48	47	7	0	4	4	13
NHL totals			7	0	0	0	2	—	—	—	—	—
AHL totals			264	33	142	175	234	56	8	27	35	69
IHL totals			345	42	129	171	381	40	7	16	23	64
