= 1993 NHL expansion draft =

Player selection draft

General information
- Date(s): June 24, 1993
- Location: Quebec City, Quebec, Canada

Overview
- League: National Hockey League
- Expansion teams: Florida Panthers; Mighty Ducks of Anaheim
- Expansion season: 1993–94

The 1993 NHL expansion draft was an expansion draft held by the National Hockey League (NHL) to fill the rosters of the league's two expansion teams for the 1993–94 season, the Florida Panthers and the Mighty Ducks of Anaheim. The draft took place on June 24, 1993, in Quebec City, Quebec, Canada.

== Rules ==
The 24 teams existing in the league at the time of the draft were each allowed to protect one goaltender, five defensemen, and nine forwards. All first-year pros were exempt, and all second-year pros on the reserve list were also exempt.

Forty-eight players were chosen in the draft, two from each franchise. Only one goaltender or one defensemen could be selected from each franchise. Therefore, six teams would lose one goaltender and one forward, sixteen teams would lose one defenseman and one forward, and two teams would lose two forwards.

Both the Panthers and the Mighty Ducks were to select three goaltenders, eight defensemen, and thirteen forwards.

== Protected players ==
=== Eastern Conference ===
Atlantic Division
| Position | New Jersey | NY Islanders | NY Rangers | Philadelphia | Tampa Bay | Washington |
|---|---|---|---|---|---|---|
| Forwards | Bill Guerin | Brad Dalgarno | Tony Amonte | Josef Beranek | Mikael Andersson | Peter Bondra |
| Forwards | Bobby Holik | Ray Ferraro | Mike Gartner | Claude Boivin | Brian Bradley | Pat Elynuik |
| Forwards | Claude Lemieux | Pat Flatley | Adam Graves | Rod Brind'Amour | Marc Bureau | Dale Hunter |
| Forwards | John MacLean | Travis Green | Joe Kocur | Dave Brown | Danton Cole | Dmitri Khristich |
| Forwards | Randy McKay | Benoit Hogue | Mark Messier | Jim Cummins | Adam Creighton | Todd Krygier |
| Forwards | Bernie Nicholls | Derek King | Sergei Nemchinov | Kevin Dineen | Rob DiMaio | Alan May |
| Forwards | Stephane Richer | Marty McInnis | Eddie Olczyk | Pelle Eklund | Petr Klima | Kelly Miller |
| Forwards | Alexander Semak | Steve Thomas | Esa Tikkanen | Brent Fedyk | John Tucker | Michal Pivonka |
| Forwards | Valeri Zelepukin | Pierre Turgeon | Darren Turcotte | Mark Recchi | Rob Zamuner | Mike Ridley |
| Defencemen | Tommy Albelin | Uwe Krupp | Jeff Beukeboom | Terry Carkner | Bob Beers | Sylvain Cote |
| Defencemen | Ken Daneyko | Scott Lachance | Brian Leetch | Garry Galley | Marc Bergevin | Kevin Hatcher |
| Defencemen | Bruce Driver | Wayne McBean | Kevin Lowe | Greg Hawgood | Shawn Chambers | Al Iafrate |
| Defencemen | Scott Niedermayer | Rich Pilon | James Patrick | Dan Kordic | Donald Dufresne | Calle Johansson |
| Defencemen | Scott Stevens | Dennis Vaske | Brad Tiley | Ryan McGill | Joe Reekie | Jason Woolley |
| Goaltender | Chris Terreri | Ron Hextall | Mike Richter | Dominic Roussel | Jean-Claude Bergeron | Rick Tabaracci |

Northeast Division
| Position | Boston | Buffalo | Hartford | Montreal | Ottawa | Pittsburgh | Quebec |
|---|---|---|---|---|---|---|---|
| Forwards | Ted Donato | Donald Audette | Andrew Cassels | Brian Bellows | Dave Archibald | Jeff Daniels | Martin Gelinas |
| Forwards | Steve Heinze | Dale Hawerchuk | Mark Janssens | Benoit Brunet | Jamie Baker | Ron Francis | Valeri Kamensky |
| Forwards | Joe Juneau | Pat LaFontaine | Robert Kron | Vincent Damphousse | Jody Hull | Jaromir Jagr | Claude Lapointe |
| Forwards | Stephen Leach | Brad May | Nick Kypreos | Paul DiPietro | Bob Kudelski | Mario Lemieux | Owen Nolan |
| Forwards | Daniel Marois | Alexander Mogilny | Sergei Makarov | Gilbert Dionne | Mark Lamb | Shawn McEachern | Mike Ricci |
| Forwards | Glen Murray | Rob Ray | Jim McKenzie | Mike Keane | Darcy Loewen | Joe Mullen | Martin Rucinsky |
| Forwards | Cam Neely | Bob Sweeney | Geoff Sanderson | Stephan Lebeau | Troy Mallette | Mike Needham | Joe Sakic |
| Forwards | Adam Oates | Scott Thomas | Jim Sandlak | John LeClair | Mike Peluso | Kevin Stevens | Mats Sundin |
| Forwards | Dave Reid | Randy Wood | Pat Verbeek | Kirk Muller | Sylvain Turgeon | Rick Tocchet | Scott Young |
| Defencemen | Ray Bourque | Doug Bodger | Adam Burt | Patrice Brisebois | Chris Luongo | Larry Murphy | Steve Duchesne |
| Defencemen | Glen Featherstone | Keith Carney | Brad McCrimmon | Eric Desjardins | Norm Maciver | Jim Paek | Adam Foote |
| Defencemen | David Shaw | Gord Donnelly | Allen Pedersen | Kevin Haller | Kent Paynter | Kjell Samuelsson | Alexei Gusarov |
| Defencemen | Don Sweeney | Ken Sutton | Eric Weinrich | Lyle Odelein | Darren Rumble | Ulf Samuelsson | Dave Karpa |
| Defencemen | Glen Wesley | Petr Svoboda | Zarley Zalapski | Mathieu Schneider | Brad Shaw | Peter Taglianetti | Curtis Leschyshyn |
| Goaltender | Andy Moog | Grant Fuhr | Sean Burke | Patrick Roy | Craig Billington | Tom Barrasso | Stephane Fiset |

=== Western Conference ===
Central Division
| Position | Chicago | Dallas | Detroit | St. Louis | Toronto | Winnipeg |
|---|---|---|---|---|---|---|
| Forwards | Dirk Graham | Shane Churla | Shawn Burr | Bob Bassen | Glenn Anderson | Stu Barnes |
| Forwards | Steve Larmer | Russ Courtnall | Dino Ciccarelli | Nelson Emerson | Dave Andreychuk | Luciano Borsato |
| Forwards | Jocelyn Lemieux | Mike Craig | Sergei Fedorov | Denny Felsner | Ken Baumgartner | Evgeny Davydov |
| Forwards | Stephane Matteau | Ulf Dahlen | Sheldon Kennedy | Brett Hull | Wendel Clark | Tie Domi |
| Forwards | Joe Murphy | Dave Gagner | Keith Primeau | Craig Janney | Mike Eastwood | Kris King |
| Forwards | Brian Noonan | Brent Gilchrist | Bob Probert | Basil McRae | Doug Gilmour | Darrin Shannon |
| Forwards | Jeremy Roenick | Trent Klatt | Ray Sheppard | Kevin Miller | Kent Manderville | Thomas Steen |
| Forwards | Christian Ruuttu | Mike McPhee | Mike Sillinger | Brendan Shanahan | Rob Pearson | Keith Tkachuk |
| Forwards | Brent Sutter | Mike Modano | Steve Yzerman | Ron Sutter | Peter Zezel | Paul Ysebaert |
| Defencemen | Chris Chelios | Paul Cavallini | Steve Chiasson | Jeff Brown | Dave Ellett | Phil Housley |
| Defencemen | Frantisek Kucera | Enrico Ciccone | Paul Coffey | Garth Butcher | Todd Gill | Dean Kennedy |
| Defencemen | Bryan Marchment | Derian Hatcher | Vladimir Konstantinov | Bret Hedican | Sylvain Lefebvre | Teppo Numminen |
| Defencemen | Cam Russell | Jim Johnson | Nicklas Lidstrom | Stephane Quintal | Jamie Macoun | Fredrik Olausson |
| Defencemen | Steve Smith | Mark Tinordi | Yves Racine | Rick Zombo | Bob Rouse | Igor Ulanov |
| Goaltender | Ed Belfour | Jon Casey | Tim Cheveldae | Curtis Joseph | Felix Potvin | Bob Essensa |

Pacific Division
| Position | Calgary | Edmonton | Los Angeles | San Jose | Vancouver |
|---|---|---|---|---|---|
| Forwards | Craig Berube | Kelly Buchberger | Jimmy Carson | Dave Capuano | Greg Adams |
| Forwards | Theoren Fleury | Zdeno Ciger | Mike Donnelly | Ed Courtenay | Pavel Bure |
| Forwards | Paul Kruse | Shayne Corson | Tony Granato | Gaetan Duchesne | Geoff Courtnall |
| Forwards | Joe Nieuwendyk | Louie DeBrusk | Wayne Gretzky | Dean Evason | Murray Craven |
| Forwards | Joel Otto | Scott Pearson | Jari Kurri | Johan Garpenlov | Trevor Linden |
| Forwards | Paul Ranheim | Steven Rice | Corey Millen | Igor Larionov | Sergio Momesso |
| Forwards | Robert Reichel | Craig Simpson | Luc Robitaille | David Maley | Petr Nedved |
| Forwards | Gary Roberts | Kevin Todd | Tomas Sandstrom | Jeff Odgers | Gino Odjick |
| Forwards | Ron Stern | Doug Weight | Brandy Semchuk | Mike Sullivan | Cliff Ronning |
| Defencemen | Kevin Dahl | Igor Kravchuk | Rob Blake | Link Gaetz | Gerald Diduck |
| Defencemen | Al MacInnis | Dave Manson | Charlie Huddy | Jayson More | Robert Dirk |
| Defencemen | Frank Musil | Luke Richardson | Marty McSorley | Jeff Norton | Jyrki Lumme |
| Defencemen | Gary Suter | Geoff Smith | Darryl Sydor | Neil Wilkinson | Dana Murzyn |
| Defencemen | Trent Yawney | Brad Werenka | Brent Thompson | Rob Zettler | Adrien Plavsic |
| Goaltender | Mike Vernon | Bill Ranford | Kelly Hrudey | Jimmy Waite | Kirk McLean |

== Draft results ==
| # | Player | Drafted from | Drafted by |
|---|---|---|---|
| 1. | John Vanbiesbrouck (G) | Vancouver Canucks | Florida Panthers |
| 2. | Guy Hebert (G) | St. Louis Blues | Mighty Ducks of Anaheim |
| 3. | Glenn Healy (G) | New York Islanders | Mighty Ducks of Anaheim |
| 4. | Mark Fitzpatrick (G) | Quebec Nordiques | Florida Panthers |
| 5. | Daren Puppa (G) | Toronto Maple Leafs | Florida Panthers |
| 6. | Ron Tugnutt (G) | Edmonton Oilers | Mighty Ducks of Anaheim |
| 7. | Milan Tichy (D) | Chicago Blackhawks | Florida Panthers |
| 8. | Alexei Kasatonov (D) | New Jersey Devils | Mighty Ducks of Anaheim |
| 9. | Sean Hill (D) | Montreal Canadiens | Mighty Ducks of Anaheim |
| 10. | Paul Laus (D) | Pittsburgh Penguins | Florida Panthers |
| 11. | Bill Houlder (D) | Buffalo Sabres | Mighty Ducks of Anaheim |
| 12. | Joe Cirella (D) | New York Rangers | Florida Panthers |
| 13. | Alexander Godynyuk (D) | Calgary Flames | Florida Panthers |
| 14. | Bobby Dollas (D) | Detroit Red Wings | Mighty Ducks of Anaheim |
| 15. | Gord Murphy (D) | Dallas Stars | Florida Panthers |
| 16. | Randy Ladouceur (D) | Hartford Whalers | Mighty Ducks of Anaheim |
| 17. | David Williams (D) | San Jose Sharks | Mighty Ducks of Anaheim |
| 18. | Steve Bancroft (D) | Winnipeg Jets | Florida Panthers |
| 19. | Dennis Vial (D) | Tampa Bay Lightning | Mighty Ducks of Anaheim |
| 20. | Stephane Richer (D) | Boston Bruins | Florida Panthers |
| 21. | Gord Hynes (D) | Philadelphia Flyers | Florida Panthers |
| 22. | Mark Ferner (D) | Ottawa Senators | Mighty Ducks of Anaheim |
| 23. | Steven King (RW) | New York Rangers | Mighty Ducks of Anaheim |
| 24. | Tom Fitzgerald (C/RW) | New York Islanders | Florida Panthers |
| 25. | Jesse Belanger (C) | Montreal Canadiens | Florida Panthers |
| 26. | Troy Loney (F) | Pittsburgh Penguins | Mighty Ducks of Anaheim |
| 27. | Scott Levins (C) | Winnipeg Jets | Florida Panthers |
| 28. | Stu Grimson (LW) | Chicago Blackhawks | Mighty Ducks of Anaheim |
| 29. | Tim Sweeney (LW) | Boston Bruins | Mighty Ducks of Anaheim |
| 30. | Scott Mellanby (RW) | Edmonton Oilers | Florida Panthers |
| 31. | Terry Yake (C) | Hartford Whalers | Mighty Ducks of Anaheim |
| 32. | Brian Skrudland (C) | Calgary Flames | Florida Panthers |
| 33. | Mike Hough (LW) | Washington Capitals | Florida Panthers |
| 34. | Jarrod Skalde (C) | New Jersey Devils | Mighty Ducks of Anaheim |
| 35. | Dave Lowry (LW) | St. Louis Blues | Florida Panthers |
| 36. | Bob Corkum (C) | Buffalo Sabres | Mighty Ducks of Anaheim |
| 37. | Anatoli Semenov (C) | Vancouver Canucks | Mighty Ducks of Anaheim |
| 38. | Bill Lindsay (LW) | Quebec Nordiques | Florida Panthers |
| 39. | Joe Sacco (RW) | Toronto Maple Leafs | Mighty Ducks of Anaheim |
| 40. | Andrei Lomakin (RW) | Philadelphia Flyers | Florida Panthers |
| 41. | Randy Gilhen (C) | Tampa Bay Lightning | Florida Panthers |
| 42. | Lonnie Loach (LW) | Los Angeles Kings | Mighty Ducks of Anaheim |
| 43. | Doug Barrault (LW) | Dallas Stars | Florida Panthers |
| 44. | Jim Thomson (RW) | Los Angeles Kings | Mighty Ducks of Anaheim |
| 45. | Trevor Halverson (LW) | Washington Capitals | Mighty Ducks of Anaheim |
| 46. | Marc LaBelle (LW) | Ottawa Senators | Florida Panthers |
| 47. | Robin Bawa (RW) | San Jose Sharks | Mighty Ducks of Anaheim |
| 48. | Pete Stauber (LW) | Detroit Red Wings | Florida Panthers |

== Phase II ==
There was a second phase to the 1993 NHL expansion draft, in which the Tampa Bay Lightning, Ottawa Senators, and San Jose Sharks (the three expansion teams who joined the league in the two previous seasons) selected players from the Panthers and Mighty Ducks. The Panthers and Mighty Ducks were allowed to protect one goaltender, five defensemen, and ten forwards. The three teams each chose two players. The Panthers and Mighty Ducks each were to lose one goaltender, one defenseman, and one forward.

This mini-draft was held the day after the main draft, on June 25, 1993.

| # | Player | Drafted from | Drafted by |
|---|---|---|---|
| 1. | Glenn Healy* (G) | Mighty Ducks of Anaheim | Tampa Bay Lightning |
| 2. | Passed | | Ottawa Senators |
| 3. | Passed | | San Jose Sharks |
| 4. | Daren Puppa (G) | Florida Panthers | Tampa Bay Lightning |
| 5. | Dennis Vial (D) | Mighty Ducks of Anaheim | Ottawa Senators |
| 6. | Passed | | San Jose Sharks |

* The Lightning, on the same day, traded Glenn Healy to the New York Rangers in exchange for a third-round pick in the 1993 NHL entry draft.

== See also ==
- 1993 NHL entry draft
- 1993 NHL supplemental draft
- 1993–94 NHL season
