= Doug Barrault =

Canadian ice hockey player (born 1970)

- Born: April 21, 1970 (age 56) Golden, British Columbia, Canada
- Height: 6 ft 2 in (188 cm)
- Weight: 205 lb (93 kg; 14 st 9 lb)
- Position: Right wing
- Shot: Right
- Played for: Minnesota North Stars; Florida Panthers
- National team: United States
- NHL draft: 155th overall, 1990; Minnesota North Stars
- Playing career: 1991–1998

Douglas Barrault (born April 21, 1970) is a Canadian-American former professional ice hockey Right Winger. Drafted 155th overall in the 1990 NHL entry draft by the Minnesota North Stars, he played in four National Hockey League games with the North Stars and Florida Panthers. He was claimed by the Panthers in the Expansion draft for their inaugural season on June 24, 1993.

== Career statistics ==
=== Regular season and playoffs ===
			Regular season					Playoffs
Season	Team	League	GP	G	A	Pts	PIM	GP	G	A	Pts	PIM
1988–89	Brandon Wheat Kings	WHL	6	1	1	2	4	—	—	—	—	—
1988–89	Lethbridge Hurricanes	WHL	51	13	12	25	30	6	0	0	0	7
1989–90	Lethbridge Hurricanes	WHL	54	14	16	30	36	19	7	3	10	0
1990–91	Lethbridge Hurricanes	WHL	4	2	2	4	16	—	—	—	—	—
1990–91	Seattle Thunderbirds	WHL	61	42	42	84	69	6	5	3	8	4
1991–92	Kalamazoo Wings	IHL	60	5	14	19	26	—	—	—	—	—
1992–93	Kalamazoo Wings	IHL	78	32	34	66	74	—	—	—	—	—
1992–93	Minnesota North Stars	NHL	2	0	0	0	2	—	—	—	—	—
1993–94	Florida Panthers	NHL	2	0	0	0	0	—	—	—	—	—
1993–94	Cincinnati Cyclones	IHL	75	36	28	64	59	9	8	2	10	0
1994–95	Cincinnati Cyclones	IHL	74	20	40	60	57	10	2	6	8	20
1995–96	Atlanta Knights	IHL	19	5	9	14	16	—	—	—	—	—
1995–96	Chicago Wolves	IHL	54	12	18	30	39	9	2	3	5	6
1996–97	Chicago Wolves	IHL	16	3	5	8	12	—	—	—	—	—
1997–98	Chicago Wolves	IHL	63	9	16	25	26	1	0	0	0	0
NHL totals			4	0	0	0	2	—	—	—	—	—

=== International ===
Year	Team	Event	Result	GP	G	A	Pts	PIM
1998	United States	WC	12th	1	0	0	0	0
Senior totals				1	0	0	0	0

== Awards and honours ==
Award	Year
WHL
West Second All-Star Team	1990–91
