= Brad Zavisha =

- Born: January 4, 1972 (age 54) Hines Creek, Alberta, Canada
- Height: 6 ft 2 in (188 cm)
- Weight: 205 lb (93 kg; 14 st 9 lb)
- Position: Left wing
- Shot: Left
- Played for: Edmonton Oilers
- NHL draft: 43rd overall, 1990; Quebec Nordiques
- Playing career: 1993–1998

Bradley J. Zavisha (born January 4, 1972) is a Canadian former professional ice hockey left winger. He was selected in the third round of the 1990 NHL entry draft, 43rd overall, by the Quebec Nordiques. After four seasons in the major junior Western Hockey League (WHL), Zavisha turned professional. He played two games in the National Hockey League (NHL) with the Edmonton Oilers during the 1993–94 season, but the majority of his career took place in the minor leagues or Europe. He was hampered by a serious knee injury, which caused him to miss the entire 1992–93 NHL season.

== Career statistics ==
=== Regular season and playoffs ===
			Regular season					Playoffs
Season	Team	League	GP	G	A	Pts	PIM	GP	G	A	Pts	PIM
1987–88	St. Albert Saints	AJHL	35	10	20	30	84	—	—	—	—	—
1988–89	Seattle Thunderbirds	WHL	52	8	13	21	43	—	—	—	—	—
1989–90	Seattle Thunderbirds	WHL	69	22	38	60	124	13	1	6	7	16
1990–91	Seattle Thunderbirds	WHL	24	15	12	27	40	—	—	—	—	—
1990–91	Portland Winter Hawks	WHL	48	25	22	47	41	—	—	—	—	—
1991–92	Portland Winter Hawks	WHL	11	7	4	11	18	—	—	—	—	—
1991–92	Lethbridge Hurricanes	WHL	59	44	40	84	160	5	3	1	4	18
1993–94	Edmonton Oilers	NHL	2	0	0	0	0	—	—	—	—	—
1993–94	Cape Breton Oilers	AHL	58	19	15	34	114	2	0	0	0	2
1994–95	Cape Breton Oilers	AHL	62	13	20	33	55	—	—	—	—	—
1994–95	Hershey Bears	AHL	9	3	0	3	12	—	—	—	—	—
1995–96	Hershey Bears	AHL	5	1	0	1	2	—	—	—	—	—
1995–96	Michigan K-Wings	IHL	5	1	0	1	2	—	—	—	—	—
1995–96	ESV Kaufbeuren	DEL	1	0	0	0	2	—	—	—	—	—
1996–97	Manchester Storm	ISL	40	10	13	23	18	6	1	0	1	0
1997–98	Birmingham Bulls	ECHL	70	19	36	55	90	4	0	0	0	4
AHL totals			134	36	35	71	183	2	0	0	0	2
NHL totals			2	0	0	0	0	—	—	—	—	—

== Awards ==
- 1992 – WHL East First All-Star team

== Transactions ==
- March 10, 1992 – Quebec trades Zavisha and Ron Tugnutt to Edmonton in exchange for Martin Ručinský
- March 13, 1995 – Edmonton trades Zavisha and a sixth-round selection in the 1995 NHL entry draft to the Philadelphia Flyers in exchange for Ryan McGill
