= Victor Gervais =

Canadian ice hockey player (born 1969)

- Born: March 13, 1969 (age 57) Prince George, British Columbia, Canada
- Height: 5 ft 9 in (175 cm)
- Weight: 170 lb (77 kg; 12 st 2 lb)
- Position: Centre
- Shot: Left
- Played for: Baltimore Skipjacks; Portland Pirates; Frankfurt Lions
- NHL draft: 187th overall, 1989; Washington Capitals
- Playing career: 1990–2005

Victor Gervais (born March 13, 1969) is a Canadian former professional ice hockey centre. He is currently working as a scout for the Prince George Spruce Kings of the British Columbia Hockey League and was formerly the general manager and head coach of the Victoria Grizzlies.

== Career ==
Gervais was drafted 187th overall in the 1989 NHL entry draft by the Washington Capitals but never played in the National Hockey League.

During his professional career, Gervais played in the American Hockey League for the Baltimore Skipjacks and Portland Pirates, the East Coast Hockey League for the Hampton Roads Admirals and Florence Pride and the International Hockey League for the Cleveland Lumberjacks and the Grand Rapids Griffins.

Gervais also played five seasons in the Deutsche Eishockey Liga in Germany for the Frankfurt Lions, playing a total of 266 games for Frankfurt. He also played roller hockey for the Anaheim Bullfrogs in both Roller Hockey International and Major League Roller Hockey between 1993 and 1998.

== Career statistics ==
			Regular season					Playoffs
Season	Team	League	GP	G	A	Pts	PIM	GP	G	A	Pts	PIM
1985–86	Prince George Spruce Kings	PCJHL	55	70	85	155	30	—	—	—	—	—
1985–86	Seattle Thunderbirds	WHL	1	0	0	0	0	—	—	—	—	—
1986–87	Seattle Thunderbirds	WHL	66	13	30	43	58	—	—	—	—	—
1987–88	Seattle Thunderbirds	WHL	69	30	46	76	134	—	—	—	—	—
1988–89	Seattle Thunderbirds	WHL	72	54	65	119	158	—	—	—	—	—
1989–90	Seattle Thunderbirds	WHL	69	64	96	160	180	13	8	9	17	30
1989–90	Baltimore Skipjacks	AHL	—	—	—	—	—	3	0	0	0	0
1990–91	Hampton Roads Admirals	ECHL	8	5	14	19	15	—	—	—	—	—
1990–91	Baltimore Skipjacks	AHL	28	2	13	15	28	—	—	—	—	—
1991–92	Hampton Roads Admirals	ECHL	44	30	43	73	79	14	6	8	14	20
1991–92	Baltimore Skipjacks	AHL	21	1	5	6	37	—	—	—	—	—
1992–93	Hampton Roads Admirals	ECHL	59	38	80	118	137	4	0	3	3	10
1992–93	Baltimore Skipjacks	AHL	10	2	4	6	2	7	1	1	2	4
1993–94	Hampton Roads Admirals	ECHL	31	22	53	75	82	—	—	—	—	—
1993–94	Cleveland Lumberjacks	IHL	37	16	16	32	18	—	—	—	—	—
1993–94	Portland Pirates	AHL	3	0	1	1	0	—	—	—	—	—
1994–95	Cleveland Lumberjacks	IHL	52	20	32	52	55	4	1	3	4	4
1995–96	Hampton Roads Admirals	ECHL	3	3	0	3	16	—	—	—	—	—
1995–96	Cleveland Lumberjacks	IHL	56	10	28	38	58	3	0	1	1	2
1996–97	Grand Rapids Griffins	IHL	14	2	4	6	16	—	—	—	—	—
1996–97	Hampton Roads Admirals	ECHL	52	28	60	88	170	7	2	12	14	12
1997–98	Portland Pirates	AHL	9	1	6	7	8	—	—	—	—	—
1997–98	Hampton Roads Admirals	ECHL	42	25	32	57	112	19	7	11	18	30
1998–99	Frankfurt Lions	DEL	49	19	24	43	89	6	0	1	1	8
1999–00	Frankfurt Lions	DEL	53	16	16	32	120	5	2	0	2	6
2000–01	Frankfurt Lions	DEL	55	10	27	37	58	—	—	—	—	—
2001–02	Frankfurt Lions	DEL	47	12	15	27	66	—	—	—	—	—
2002–03	Frankfurt Lions	DEL	46	7	9	16	75	—	—	—	—	—
2003–04	Florence Pride	ECHL	27	6	23	29	46	—	—	—	—	—
2003–04	Saint-Jean Mission	QSMHL	16	6	9	15	26	17	7	13	20	16
2004–05	Sorel-Tracy Mission	LNAH	45	21	33	54	112	—	—	—	—	—
AHL totals			71	6	29	35	75	10	1	1	2	4
ECHL totals			266	157	305	462	657	44	15	34	49	72
DEL totals			250	64	91	155	408	16	2	2	4	28
