= Len Barrie =

Canadian ice hockey player (born 1969)

- Born: June 4, 1969 (age 57) Kimberley, British Columbia, Canada
- Height: 6 ft 1 in (185 cm)
- Weight: 200 lb (91 kg; 14 st 4 lb)
- Position: Centre
- Shot: Right
- Played for: Philadelphia Flyers; Florida Panthers; Pittsburgh Penguins; Los Angeles Kings
- NHL draft: 124th overall, 1988; Edmonton Oilers
- Playing career: 1990–2001

Leonard G. Barrie (born June 4, 1969) is a Canadian former professional ice hockey forward who played 184 games in the National Hockey League.

He played for the Philadelphia Flyers, Pittsburgh Penguins, Los Angeles Kings, and Florida Panthers. He was a co-owner of the Tampa Bay Lightning, and was the president and coach of the Victoria Grizzlies of the British Columbia Hockey League.

== Post-playing career ==
=== Tampa Bay Lightning ===
On June 18, 2008, the NHL Board of Governors approved the sale of the Tampa Bay Lightning to an investment group which included Barrie and movie producer Oren Koules.

It was alleged that Barrie and Koules began to disagree on team management issues, that were believed to include NHL superstar Vincent Lecavalier being traded. This became such a problem that NHL commissioner Gary Bettman intervened and had a meeting with the two owners. Both were given the opportunity to buy the other out. Neither exercised that option and the team was later sold to Jeff Vinik, a minority owner of the Boston Red Sox.

=== Bear Mountain ===
Barrie was a real estate resort developer in the Victoria, British Columbia, area. At one time he was the major partner in the Bear Mountain Resort development in Langford municipality. Bear Mountain includes the Bear Mountain Westin Hotel, golf course, and housing (single-family homes and condominiums).

The development of Bear Mountain Resort has been criticized for damaging sensitive ecosystems and historic native sites.

In 2012, Barrie was the target of numerous legal actions and eventually parted from the Bear Mountain ownership group. At the same time, Barrie declared bankruptcy and had to give up his Langford home. Bear Mountain currently has a new management team after being under court protection from creditors.

== Personal life ==
Barrie's son, Tyson, followed in his footsteps and most recently played for the Calgary Flames of the National Hockey League.

== Career statistics ==
			Regular season					Playoffs
Season	Team	League	GP	G	A	Pts	PIM	GP	G	A	Pts	PIM
1985–86	Calgary Spurs	AJHL	23	7	14	21	86	—	—	—	—	—
1985–86	Calgary Wranglers	WHL	32	3	0	3	18	—	—	—	—	—
1986–87	Calgary Wranglers	WHL	34	13	13	26	81	—	—	—	—	—
1986–87	Victoria Cougars	WHL	34	7	6	13	92	5	0	1	1	15
1987–88	Victoria Cougars	WHL	70	37	49	86	192	8	2	0	2	29
1988–89	Victoria Cougars	WHL	67	39	48	87	157	7	5	2	7	23
1989–90	Kamloops Blazers	WHL	70	85	100	185	108	17	14	23	37	24
1989–90	Philadelphia Flyers	NHL	1	0	0	0	0	—	—	—	—	—
1990–91	Hershey Bears	AHL	63	26	32	58	60	7	4	0	4	12
1991–92	Hershey Bears	AHL	75	42	43	85	78	3	0	2	2	32
1992–93	Hershey Bears	AHL	61	31	45	76	162	—	—	—	—	—
1992–93	Philadelphia Flyers	NHL	8	2	2	4	9	—	—	—	—	—
1993–94	Cincinnati Cyclones	IHL	77	45	71	116	246	11	8	13	21	60
1993–94	Florida Panthers	NHL	2	0	0	0	0	—	—	—	—	—
1993–94	Rochester Americans	AHL	—	—	—	—	—	3	0	1	1	0
1994–95	Cleveland Lumberjacks	IHL	28	13	30	43	137	—	—	—	—	—
1994–95	Pittsburgh Penguins	NHL	48	3	11	14	66	4	1	0	1	8
1995–96	Pittsburgh Penguins	NHL	5	0	0	0	18	—	—	—	—	—
1995–96	Cleveland Lumberjacks	IHL	55	29	43	72	178	3	2	3	5	6
1996–97	San Antonio Dragons	IHL	57	26	40	66	196	9	5	5	10	20
1997–98	San Antonio Dragons	IHL	32	7	13	20	90	—	—	—	—	—
1997–98	Frankfurt Lions	DEL	25	11	19	30	32	6	2	3	5	35
1998–99	Frankfurt Lions	DEL	41	24	35	59	105	8	2	4	6	43
1999–2000	Long Beach Ice Dogs	IHL	17	10	10	20	16	—	—	—	—	—
1999–2000	Los Angeles Kings	NHL	46	5	8	13	56	—	—	—	—	—
1999–2000	Florida Panthers	NHL	14	4	6	10	6	4	0	0	0	0
2000–01	Florida Panthers	NHL	60	5	18	23	135	—	—	—	—	—
NHL totals			184	19	45	64	290	8	1	0	1	8
AHL totals			199	99	120	219	300	13	4	3	7	44
IHL totals			266	130	207	337	863	23	15	21	36	86

== Awards ==
- WHL West First All-Star Team – 1990
