= Glen Goodall =

Canadian ice hockey player (born 1970)

- Born: January 22, 1970 (age 56) Fort Nelson, British Columbia, Canada
- Height: 5 ft 8 in (173 cm)
- Weight: 170 lb (77 kg; 12 st 2 lb)
- Position: Centre
- Shot: Right
- Played for: Flint Spirits; Adirondack Red Wings; Binghamton Rangers; San Diego Gulls; Erie Panthers; Star Bulls Rosenheim; ERC Ingolstadt; Seattle Thunderbirds
- NHL draft: 206th overall, 1988; Detroit Red Wings
- Playing career: 1990–2010

Glen Goodall (born 22 January 1970) is a Canadian former professional ice hockey player who last played for ERC Ingolstadt in the Deutsche Eishockey Liga (DEL). He was selected by the Detroit Red Wings in the 10th round (206th overall) of the 1988 NHL entry draft.

== Seattle Thunderbirds ==
A member of the Seattle Thunderbirds from 1984 to 1990, Goodall is the all-time leader of the Western Hockey League in games played (399) and goals scored (262), and second in points scored (573). Goodall was the first player in WHL history to score 3 short-handed goals in a game, accomplishing the feat on January 27, 1990, versus the Victoria Cougars. His record-setting 63 goals scored during his 16-year-old season in 1986-87 still stands as the highest goals total in a season by a 16-year-old in the WHL.

== Awards ==
- WHL West Second All-Star Team – 1987 & 1990
- Four Broncos Memorial Trophy (WHL Player of the Year) (1989–90)

== Career statistics ==
			Regular season					Playoffs
Season	Team	League	GP	G	A	Pts	PIM	GP	G	A	Pts	PIM
1984–85	Seattle Breakers	WHL	59	5	21	26	6	—	—	—	—	—
1985–86	Seattle Thunderbirds	WHL	65	13	28	41	53	4	1	1	2	0
1986–87	Seattle Thunderbirds	WHL	68	63	49	112	64	—	—	—	—	—
1987–88	Seattle Thunderbirds	WHL	70	53	64	117	88	—	—	—	—	—
1988–89	Seattle Thunderbirds	WHL	70	52	62	114	58	—	—	—	—	—
1988–89	Flint Spirits	IHL	9	5	4	9	4	—	—	—	—	—
1989–90	Seattle Thunderbirds	WHL	67	76	87	163	83	10	7	7	14	2
1990–91	Adirondack Red Wings	AHL	69	18	23	41	49	2	0	0	0	2
1991–92	Erie Panthers	ECHL	14	6	20	26	12	4	1	1	2	2
1991–92	San Diego Gulls	IHL	19	1	11	12	10	—	—	—	—	—
1991–92	Binghamton Rangers	AHL	6	0	2	2	0	—	—	—	—	—
1992–93	Erie Panthers	ECHL	60	38	62	100	89	5	6	3	9	6
1993–94	EHC Klostersee	DEU III	44	58	66	124	48	—	—	—	—	—
1994–95	EHC Klostersee	DEU II	44	48	68	116	63	—	—	—	—	—
1994–95	Star Bulls Rosenheim	DEL	1	0	1	1	2	—	—	—	—	—
1995–96	SERC Wild Wings	DEL	2	1	1	2	0	—	—	—	—	—
1995–96	EHC Klostersee	DEU II	49	48	61	109	63	—	—	—	—	—
1996–97	Deggendorf Fire	DEU II	53	44	66	110	38	—	—	—	—	—
1997–98	Deggendorf Fire	DEU II	54	51	69	120	63	—	—	—	—	—
1998–99	Deggendorf Fire	DEU III	42	24	54	78	44	—	—	—	—	—
1999–2000	ERC Ingolstadt	DEU II	50	19	52	71	30	13	8	8	16	26
2000–01	ERC Ingolstadt	DEU II	43	21	40	61	55	12	5	9	14	14
2001–02	ERC Ingolstadt	DEU II	50	17	40	57	75	11	4	5	9	10
2002–03	ERC Ingolstadt	DEL	52	10	17	27	36	—	—	—	—	—
2003–04	ERC Ingolstadt	DEL	52	6	18	24	42	9	3	3	6	12
2004–05	ERC Ingolstadt	DEL	51	5	16	21	56	11	0	3	3	10
2005–06	ERC Ingolstadt	DEL	52	8	13	21	72	7	3	3	6	2
2006–07	ERC Ingolstadt	DEL	43	6	12	18	38	6	0	1	1	6
2007–08	ERC Ingolstadt	DEL	46	10	26	36	89	3	0	1	1	12
2008–09	ERC Ingolstadt	DEL	49	11	16	27	96	—	—	—	—	—
2009–10	ERC Ingolstadt	DEL	35	0	5	5	18	10	0	2	2	6
AHL totals			75	18	25	43	49	2	0	0	0	2
DEU II totals			343	248	396	644	387	36	17	22	39	50
DEL totals			383	57	125	182	449	46	6	13	19	48
