= Jason Widmer =

Canadian ice hockey player

- Born: August 1, 1973 (age 52) Calgary, Alberta, Canada
- Height: 6 ft 0 in (183 cm)
- Weight: 218 lb (99 kg; 15 st 8 lb)
- Position: Defence
- Shot: Left
- Played for: NHL; San Jose Sharks; New York Islanders; AHL; Capital District Islanders; Worcester IceCats; Kentucky Thoroughblades
- NHL draft: 176th overall, 1992; New York Islanders
- Playing career: 1993–2000

Jason Widmer (born August 1, 1973) is a Canadian former professional ice hockey defenceman. He played in the National Hockey League with both the New York Islanders and San Jose Sharks.

== Career statistics ==
=== Regular season and playoffs ===
			Regular season					Playoffs
Season	Team	League	GP	G	A	Pts	PIM	GP	G	A	Pts	PIM
1989–90	Moose Jaw Warriors	WHL	58	1	8	9	33	—	—	—	—	—
1990–91	Lethbridge Hurricanes	WHL	58	2	12	14	55	16	0	1	1	12
1991–92	Lethbridge Hurricanes	WHL	40	2	19	21	181	5	0	4	4	9
1992–93	Lethbridge Hurricanes	WHL	55	3	15	18	140	4	0	3	3	2
1992–93	Capital District Islanders	AHL	4	0	0	0	2	—	—	—	—	—
1993–94	Lethbridge Hurricanes	WHL	64	11	31	42	191	9	3	5	8	34
1994–95	Canadian National Team	Intl	6	1	4	5	4	—	—	—	—	—
1994–95	Worcester IceCats	AHL	73	8	26	34	136	—	—	—	—	—
1994–95	New York Islanders	NHL	1	0	0	0	0	—	—	—	—	—
1995–96	Worcester IceCats	AHL	76	6	21	27	129	4	2	0	2	9
1995–96	New York Islanders	NHL	4	0	0	0	7	—	—	—	—	—
1996–97	Kentucky Thoroughblades	AHL	76	4	24	28	105	4	0	0	0	8
1996–97	San Jose Sharks	NHL	2	0	1	1	0	—	—	—	—	—
1997–98	Kentucky Thoroughblades	AHL	71	5	13	18	176	3	0	0	0	6
1998–99	Worcester IceCats	AHL	25	2	3	5	42	—	—	—	—	—
1999–00	Worcester IceCats	AHL	12	0	5	5	23	—	—	—	—	—
AHL totals			337	25	92	117	613	11	2	0	2	23
NHL totals			7	0	1	1	7	—	—	—	—	—
