= Lethbridge Hurricanes =

Western Hockey League team in Lethbridge, Alberta

- City: Lethbridge, Alberta
- League: Western Hockey League
- Conference: Eastern
- Division: Central
- Founded: 1967
- Home arena: VisitLethbridge.com Arena
- Colours: Red, navy, white
- General manager: Barclay Parneta
- Head coach: Matt Anholt
- Website: chl.ca/whl-hurricanes

Franchise history
- 1967–1973: Winnipeg Jets
- 1973–1976: Winnipeg Clubs
- 1976–1977: Winnipeg Monarchs
- 1977–1987: Calgary Wranglers
- 1987–present: Lethbridge Hurricanes

Championships
- Regular season titles: 1 (1996–97)
- Playoff championships: Ed Chynoweth Cup; 1 (1997); Conference Championships; 2 (1996–97, 2007–08)

Current uniform

The Lethbridge Hurricanes are a Canadian junior ice hockey team based in Lethbridge, Alberta. The Hurricanes play in the Central Division of the Western Hockey League's Eastern Conference, and play their home games at the VisitLethbridge.com Arena. The team replaced Lethbridge's first major junior team, the Broncos, who played in the city from 1974 to 1986. When that team relocated to Swift Current, Saskatchewan, the city acquired the Calgary Wranglers franchise and the Hurricanes began play in 1987.

== History ==
The Lethbridge Broncos played at the VisitLethbridge.com Arena from 1974 until 1986. Originally the Swift Current Broncos, the team returned to Swift Current in 1986 when local investors gathered enough resources to make the team a community-owned club. However, neither the league nor the city wanted Lethbridge to be left without a team, and just one year later, the Calgary Wranglers were relocated to Lethbridge to become the Hurricanes, which was a community-owned team. While the Broncos had adopted their name from the Swift Current club, the new team was named through a fan contest, with Hurricanes emerging the winner, a reference to the locally significant Chinook winds.

The team enjoyed early success in Lethbridge, winning back-to-back division titles in their third and fourth seasons and advancing to the championship series both years. The team's best season came in 1996–97, when the Hurricanes captured their first, and to date only, regular season and playoff titles. The Hurricanes advanced to the 1997 Memorial Cup tournament, where they rallied in the round robin to defeat the Hull Olympiques 7–6 in overtime after trailing 6–1 after two periods. The final was a rematch between Lethbridge and Hull, with Hull hanging on for a 5–1 victory, leaving the Hurricanes as runners-up. After that season, the Hurricanes would go ten straight seasons without a playoff series win. Then, in the 2007–08 season, the Hurricanes returned to the playoff final, which they lost to the eventual Memorial Cup champion Spokane Chiefs.

Despite optimism going into the season under new coach Drake Berehowsky, who replaced Rich Preston, the 2013–14 season would be a record-setting one, but in the wrong categories. In the middle of what would become a six-year playoff drought, the team struggled on the ice and dealt with turmoil amongst the players and coaching staff. Veteran forwards Sam McKechnie and Jaimen Yakuboski were sent home until they were traded to the Seattle Thunderbirds in October. A week later, defenceman Ryan Pilon requested a trade and left the team. In addition to two more players requesting trades, assistant coach Brad Lukowich walked out on the team following a 3–2 victory over the Prince Albert Raiders. Lukowich was terminated "with cause" days later. The team hit new lows by scoring a franchise-low 171 goals, allowing 358 goals, and losing two games by a combined score of 22–0, including a 10–0 loss to the Vancouver Giants on January 24, 2014, followed by a 12–0 loss to the Edmonton Oil Kings on February 17. The team finished the season on a 15-game losing streak, finishing the year with 12 wins and 29 points, setting records for fewest wins and fewest points in the 46-year history of the franchise.

It was revealed that the community-owned franchise was also facing financial problems, losing more than $1.25 million in a two-year period and taking out a line of credit in order to stay afloat. The financial situation led to rumours of the team being sold to True North Sports and Entertainment and relocated to Winnipeg, while former Hurricanes forward and Lethbridge native Kris Versteeg stated his desire to purchase the team and keep it in the city. Ultimately, the shareholders voted to raise $2 million by issuing preferred shares, keeping the team community-owned.

The team returned to stability and made back-to-back runs to the conference final in 2017 and 2018. In 2018, they matched up against Swift Current after the teams swung a blockbuster trade together at the season's trade deadline, including swapping goaltenders. The Broncos won the series in six games, and went on to win the league title.

In 2023, the Hurricanes courted controversy by hiring former NHL head coach Bill Peters as the team's new coach. Peters had resigned as coach of the Calgary Flames in 2019 after allegations of racism and physical abuse surfaced against him. WHL commissioner Ron Robison endorsed the hiring, stating that Peters would be undertaking anti-racism education.

The team’s general manager Peter Anholt resigned on January 9, 2026 after 11 seasons following a second investigation by the Western Hockey League, after a historical complaint against him was reported. Anholt was the subject of an earlier investigation during the season, after he reportedly violated the WHL Code of Conduct by using abusive and threatening language towards his players. Former Vancouver Giants general manager Barclay Parneta was named his replacement for the rest of the season.

Hurricanes logo c. 2009–2011.

== Logos and jerseys ==
The Hurricanes have gone through a number of design changes over the years, while maintaining a variation of red, blue, and white colours. For several seasons, they donned a Tasmanian Devil-inspired twister logo. From 2004, they began gradually simplifying the logo, until 2013, when they ran afoul of the National Hockey League Washington Capitals, who took issue with a Hurricanes logo and jerseys that were near copies of those used by the Capitals. The Hurricanes were forced to change their look, and adopted their alternate logo full-time. Around the same time, a third-jersey design was introduced featuring a Hawker Hurricane World War II airplane.

== Season-by-season record ==
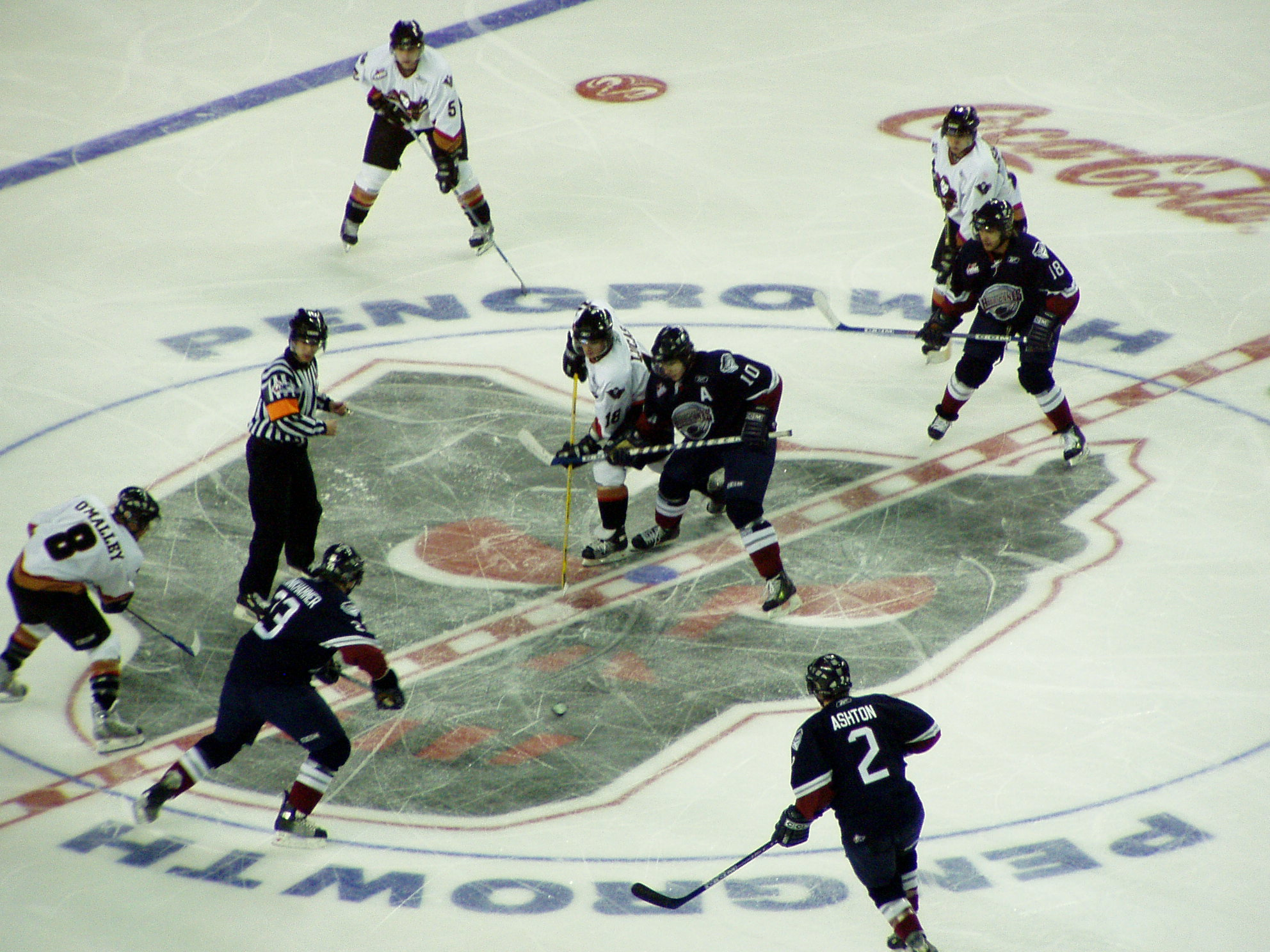
Playoff action against the Calgary Hitmen at the Saddledome.

Note: GP = Games played, W = Wins, L = Losses, T = Ties, OTL = Overtime losses, GF = Goals for, GA = Goals against

Season	GP	W	L	T	OTL	GF	GA	Points	Finish	Playoffs
1987–88	72	20	48	4	—	257	357	44	7th East	Did not qualify
1988–89	72	27	39	6	—	356	380	60	5th East	Lost East Division semifinal
1989–90	72	51	17	4	—	465	270	106	1st East	Lost Final
1990–91	72	45	21	6	—	373	281	96	1st East	Lost Final
1991–92	72	39	31	2	—	350	284	80	4th East	Lost in first round
1992–93	72	33	36	3	—	317	328	69	5th East	Lost in first round
1993–94	72	35	32	5	—	306	317	75	3rd East	Lost East Division semifinal
1994–95	72	22	48	2	—	263	341	46	8th East	Did not qualify
1995–96	72	33	36	3	—	259	270	69	2nd Central	Lost in first round
1996–97	72	47	22	3	—	342	248	97	1st Central	Won Championship; Lost Memorial Cup Final
1997–98	72	32	29	11	—	261	237	75	2nd Central	Lost in first round
1998–99	72	31	32	9	—	224	215	71	3rd Central	Lost in first round
1999–00	72	25	38	4	5	220	250	59	4th Central	Did not qualify
2000–01	72	29	35	4	4	200	229	66	4th Central	Lost in first round
2001–02	72	33	33	6	0	266	247	72	4th Central	Lost Eastern Conference quarterfinal
2002–03	72	28	40	2	2	236	303	60	5th Central	Did not qualify
2003–04	72	27	28	10	7	196	203	71	5th Central	Did not qualify
2004–05	72	39	20	12	1	222	162	91	2nd Central	Lost Eastern Conference quarterfinal
Season	GP	W	L	OTL	SOL	GF	GA	Points	Finish	Playoffs
2005–06	72	27	36	3	6	195	250	63	3rd Central	Lost Eastern Conference quarterfinal
2006–07	72	33	34	2	3	254	265	71	5th Central	Did not qualify
2007–08	72	45	21	2	4	245	175	96	2nd Central	Lost Final
2008–09	72	35	32	3	2	227	228	75	4th Central	Lost Eastern Conference semifinal
2009–10	72	20	44	5	3	178	275	48	5th Central	Did not qualify
2010–11	72	23	36	5	8	205	295	59	5th Central	Did not qualify
2011–12	72	29	42	0	1	225	292	59	6th Central	Did not qualify
2012–13	72	28	34	3	7	212	253	66	6th Central	Did not qualify
2013–14	72	12	55	2	3	171	358	29	6th Central	Did not qualify
2014–15	72	20	44	5	3	202	304	48	6th Central	Did not qualify
2015–16	72	46	24	1	1	304	218	94	1st Central	Lost Eastern Conference quarterfinal
2016–17	72	44	21	4	3	280	253	95	2nd Central	Lost Eastern Conference final
2017–18	72	33	33	6	0	244	260	72	2nd Central	Lost Eastern Conference final
2018–19	68	40	18	5	5	268	234	90	2nd Central	Lost Eastern Conference quarterfinal
2019–20	63	37	19	2	5	249	193	81	3rd Central	Cancelled due to the COVID-19 pandemic
2020–21	24	9	12	3	0	81	108	21	4th Central	No playoffs due to the COVID-19 pandemic
2021–22	68	33	30	4	1	216	238	71	3rd Central	Lost Eastern Conference quarterfinal
2022–23	68	36	26	3	3	204	207	78	2nd Central	Lost Eastern Conference quarterfinal
2023–24	68	33	28	7	0	214	210	73	4th Central	Lost Eastern Conference quarterfinal
2024–25	68	42	21	3	2	226	199	89	3rd Central	Lost Eastern Conference final
2025–26	68	17	47	3	1	198	319	38	6th Central	Did not qualify

== Championship History ==
- Ed Chynoweth Cup: 1996–97
- Scotty Munro Memorial Trophy: 1996–97
- Playoff Division/Conference titles (4): 1989–90, 1990–91, 1996–97, 2007–08
- Regular season Division titles (4): 1989–90, 1990–91, 1996–97, 2015–16

=== WHL Championship ===
- 1989–90: Loss, 1–4 vs Kamloops Blazers
- 1990–91: Loss, 0–4 vs Spokane Chiefs
- 1996–97: Win, 4–0 vs Seattle Thunderbirds
- 2007–08: Loss, 0–4 vs Spokane Chiefs

=== Memorial Cup finals ===
- 1997: Loss, 1–5 vs Hull Olympiques

== NHL alumni ==
- Calen Addison
- Carter Bancks
- Doug Barrault
- Kyle Beach
- Zach Boychuk
- Travis Brigley
- Dylan Cozens
- Allan Egeland
- Eric Godard
- Mark Greig
- Terry Hollinger
- D. J. King
- Dwight King
- Rob Klinkhammer
- Kirby Law
- Ross Lupaschuk
- Bryan Maxwell
- Jason McBain
- Jamie McLennan
- Brantt Myhres
- Chris Phillips
- Domenic Pittis
- Dale Purinton
- Jamie Pushor
- Byron Ritchie
- Jason Ruff
- Luca Sbisa
- Bryce Salvador
- Colton Sceviour
- Akira Schmid
- Brent Seabrook
- Brandy Semchuk
- Cam Severson
- Stuart Skinner
- Mark Smith
- Lee Sorochan
- Martin Spanhel
- Nick Tarnasky
- Wes Walz
- Jason Widmer
- Shane Willis
- Brayden Yager
- Matthew Yeats
- Brad Zavisha
- Kris Versteeg

== Team records ==
Team records for a single season
Statistic	Total	Season
Most points	106	1989–90
Most wins	51	1989–90
Fewest points	29	2013–14
Fewest wins	12	2013–14
Most goals for	465	1989–90
Fewest goals for	171	2013–14
Fewest goals against	162	2004–05
Most goals against	380	1988–89

Individual player records for a single season
Statistic	Player	Total	Season
Most goals	Kevin St. Jacques	65	1991–92
Most assists	Bryan Bosch	90	1989–90
Most points	Corey Lyons	142	1989–90
Most points, rookie	Corey Lyons	112	1988–89
Most points, defenceman	Shane Peacock	102	1992–93
Best GAA (goalie)	Aaron Sorochan	2.19	2004–05
Goalies = minimum 1500 minutes played

== See also ==
- List of ice hockey teams in Alberta
