= Seattle Thunderbirds =

Western Hockey League team in Kent, Washington

- City: Kent, Washington
- League: Western Hockey League
- Conference: Western
- Division: U.S.
- Founded: 1971
- Home arena: accesso ShoWare Center
- Colors: Navy blue, green, white
- General manager: Bil La Forge
- Head coach: Matt O'Dette
- Website: chl.ca/whl-thunderbirds/

Franchise history
- 1971–1973: Vancouver Nats
- 1973–1977: Kamloops Chiefs
- 1977–1985: Seattle Breakers
- 1985–present: Seattle Thunderbirds

Championships
- Playoff championships: Ed Chynoweth Cup; 2 (2017, 2023); Conference Championships; 5 (1996–97, 2015–16, 2016–17, 2021–22, 2022–23)

Current uniform

The Seattle Thunderbirds are a major junior ice hockey team based in the city of Kent, Washington. They are part of the U.S. Division of the Western Conference in the Western Hockey League. Founded in 1971 as the Vancouver Nats, the team arrived in Seattle in 1977 and played as the Breakers until 1985, when they adopted the Thunderbirds name. The team played in Seattle for three decades before moving to the accesso ShoWare Center in nearby Kent in 2008. The Thunderbirds are two-time WHL champions, with their most recent title coming in 2023.

== History ==
=== Foundations ===
The team was founded in 1971 as the Vancouver Nats of the Western Canada Hockey League, but moved to Kamloops, British Columbia, after just two seasons to become the Kamloops Chiefs in 1973. In 1977, the team moved again, this time to Seattle, and was renamed the Seattle Breakers. The move came just years after the city narrowly missed out on securing a National Hockey League franchise. The Breakers began play in 1977–78, and played out of the Seattle Center Arena. Through eight seasons, the Breakers finished with a regular season record of 225 wins, 319 losses, and 32 ties; and playoff record of 11 wins and 21 losses, twice advancing as far as the West Division finals. The team nearly folded in 1982 when, under owner John Hamilton, it filed for Chapter 11 bankruptcy. This reality, combined with novel promotions like honoring unused Seattle Seahawks tickets at the gate, boosted attendance at Breakers games. This was also helped by on-ice success. Despite the off-ice challenges, the team, under coach Jack Sangster, swept the Victoria Cougars in the playoffs to advance to the Division finals. There, they faced the rival Portland Winter Hawks, dropping the series to the eventual champions 4 games to 2.

=== The Thunderbirds ===
After the 1984–85 season, the Breakers were sold to new owners and renamed the Seattle Thunderbirds as part of an extensive re-branding. Along with the new name, the team changed its color-scheme from orange, blue, and white, to green, blue, and white, announced a renovation plan for its home arena, and by 1990 began playing some of its games at the larger Seattle Center Coliseum. New management promised to spare no expense and to turn the team into a contender. This included hiring Russ Farwell as manager and Barry Melrose as coach—the two had been instrumental in the Medicine Hat Tigers' 1988 Memorial Cup championship. However, despite the scoring exploits of Glen Goodall—Goodall set new league records for goals (262) and points (573) and had his number 10 jersey retired when he turned professional in 1990—it would be twelve years before the Thunderbirds broke through to their first league final. Led by star forward Patrick Marleau, the Thunderbirds faced the Lethbridge Hurricanes in the 1997 championship series, which they lost in a sweep. Although the Thunderbirds would win their first and second regular season Division titles in 2002–03 and 2004–05, the eighteen seasons after their first finals appearance would see the team advance past the second round of the playoffs just once.

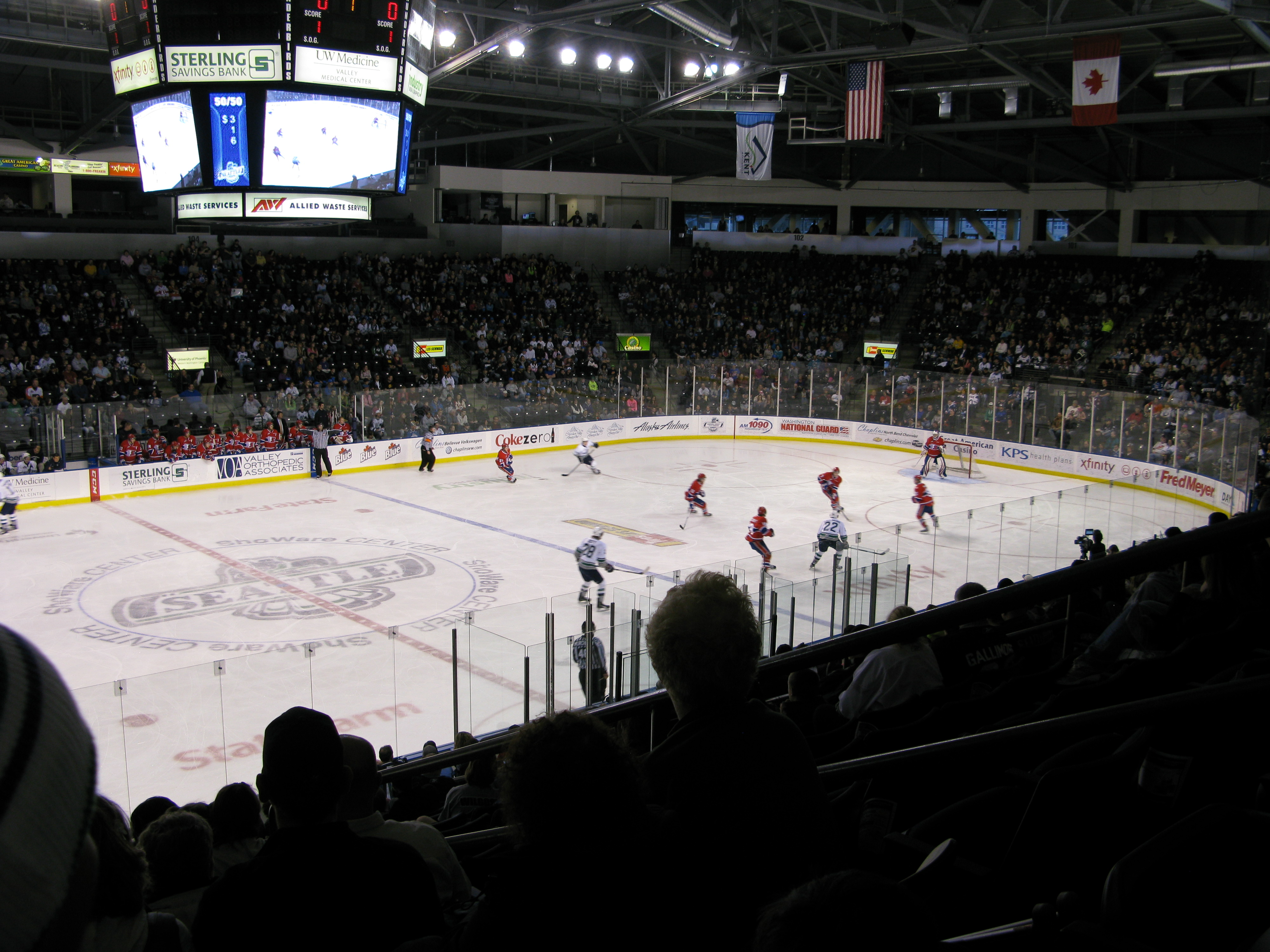
The Thunderbirds hosting the Spokane Chiefs in a 2012 game.

In 2006, the Thunderbirds announced their intention to move to a brand new arena being constructed in Kent, south of Seattle. The purpose-built arena was a major attraction for the team.

2015 marked the beginning of the most successful period in team history, as the Thunderbirds advanced to the finals four times in eight seasons, twice capturing the Ed Chynoweth Cup as league champions. Led by the likes of Matthew Barzal, Ethan Bear, and Keegan Kolesar, the 2015–16 season saw the Thunderbirds capture their first Division title since 2005 and make their deepest playoff run since 1997 when Matthew Wedman's game four overtime goal sent the Thunderbirds past the Kelowna Rockets and into the championship final. They lost the final in five games to the Brandon Wheat Kings. The following season, the Thunderbirds returned to the final, where they faced the Regina Pats. They defeated the Pats in six games, with Alexander True scoring the title-winning goal in overtime of game six to secure Seattle's first championship. With the win, Seattle advanced to the 2017 Memorial Cup tournament, where they were eliminated after three straight losses in the preliminary round.

After two straight first-round exits and two years without playoffs due to the COVID-19 pandemic, the Thunderbirds again emerged as a contender in the 2021–22 season. That season, the team returned to the finals and faced the Edmonton Oil Kings to contest the first league playoff title since 2019. Seattle lost the final in six games. The following season was the best in Thunderbirds' history with the team posting 54 wins and 111 points. In the playoffs, they eliminated the Memorial Cup-host Kamloops Blazers in the Western Conference championship, moving on to face the Winnipeg Ice in the title series. They defeated the Ice in five games to earn a berth in the 2023 Memorial Cup tournament. There, led by Dylan Guenther and goaltender Thomas Milic, the Thunderbirds advanced to the tournament final, which they lost to the Quebec Remparts.

=== Rivals ===
The Thunderbirds are one of five WHL teams based in Washington, along with the Tri-City Americans, Spokane Chiefs, Wenatchee Wild, and Everett Silvertips. The Thunderbirds have built an enduring rivalry with the Portland Winterhawks, dating back to the 1980s. Everett is the closest team to Seattle and a natural rival; and the two teams have met regularly in the playoffs, including a three-year stretch between 2016 and 2018 where the winner of the series between the two made it all the way to the championship series.

== Season-by-season record ==
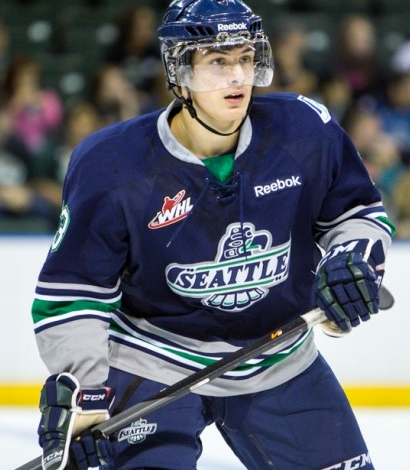
Mathew Barzal played for the Thunderbirds between 2013 and 2017.

Note: GP = Games played, W = Wins, L = Losses, T = Ties OTL = Overtime losses Pts = Points, GF = Goals for, GA = Goals against

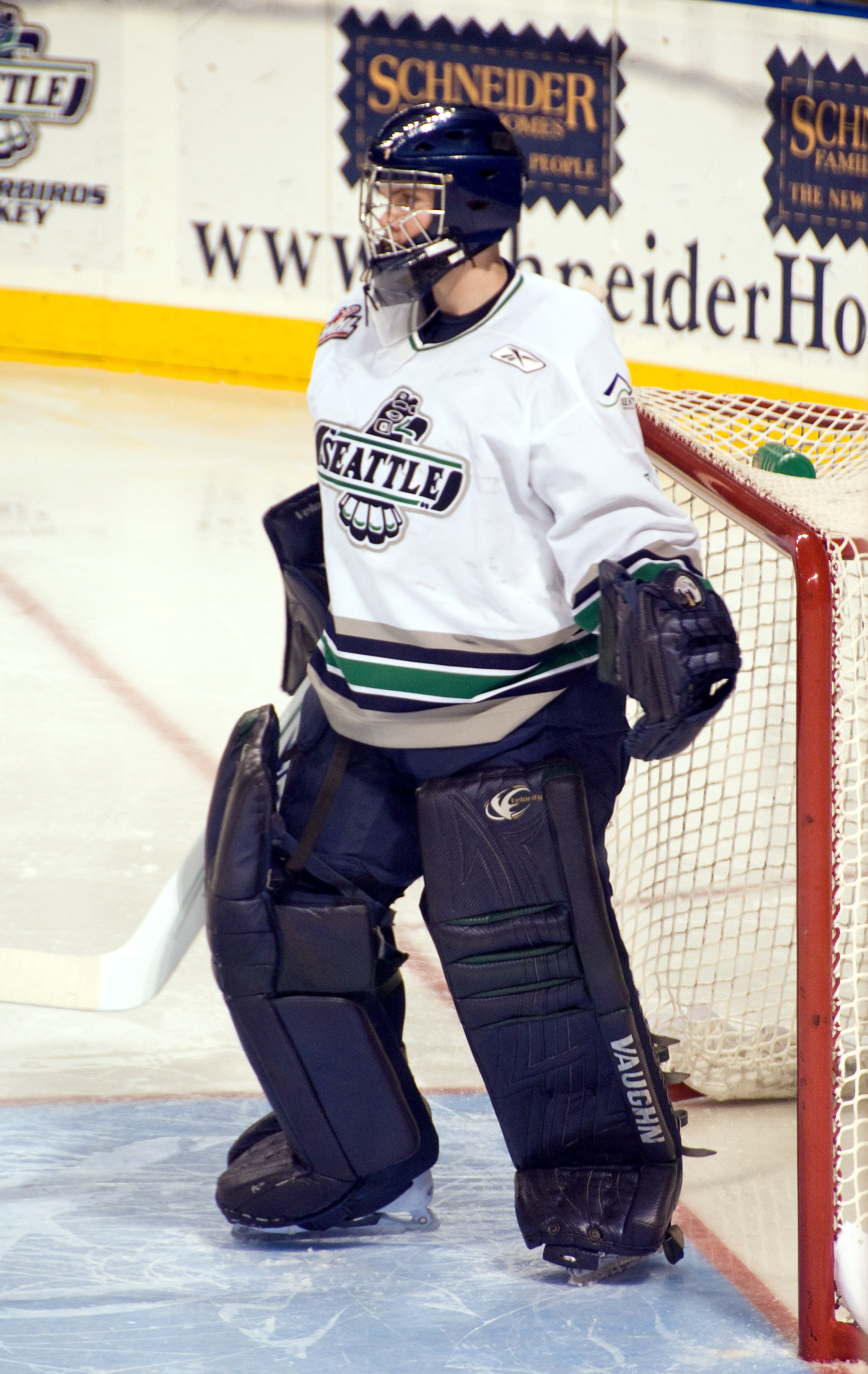
Calvin Pickard played for the Thunderbirds between 2008 and 2012.

Season	GP	W	L	T	OTL	GF	GA	Points	Finish	Playoffs
Seattle Breakers
1977–78	72	32	28	12	–	359	316	76	4th West	Did not qualify
1978–79	72	21	40	11	–	299	334	53	4th West	Did not qualify
1979–80	72	29	41	2	–	297	364	60	3rd West	Lost West Division final
1980–81	72	26	46	0	–	318	393	52	3rd West	Lost West Division semifinal
1981–82	72	36	34	2	–	339	310	74	3rd West	Lost West Division final
1982–83	72	24	47	1	–	319	418	49	4th West	Lost West Division semifinal
1983–84	72	32	39	1	–	350	379	65	4th West	Lost West Division semifinal
1984–85	72	25	44	3	–	320	416	53	5th West	Did not qualify
Seattle Thunderbirds
1985–86	72	27	43	2	–	373	413	56	4th West	Lost West Division semifinal
1986–87	72	21	47	4	–	328	430	46	5th West	Did not qualify
1987–88	72	25	46	2	–	313	436	52	5th West	Did not qualify
1988–89	72	33	35	4	–	315	276	70	5th West	Did not qualify
1989–90	72	52	17	3	–	444	295	107	2nd West	Lost West Division final
1990–91	72	42	26	4	–	319	317	88	3rd West	Lost West Division semifinal
1991–92	72	33	34	5	–	292	285	71	4th West	Lost West Division final
1992–93	72	31	38	3	–	234	292	65	4th West	Lost West Division quarterfinal
1993–94	72	32	37	3	–	283	312	67	4th West	Lost West Division semifinal
1994–95	72	42	28	2	–	319	282	86	3rd West	Eliminated in round-robin
1995–96	72	29	36	7	–	255	281	65	5th West	Lost West Division quarterfinal
1996–97	72	41	27	4	–	311	249	86	2nd West	Lost Final
1997–98	72	31	35	6	–	286	278	68	6th West	Lost West Division quarterfinal
1998–99	72	37	24	11	–	279	236	85	3rd West	Lost West Division semifinal
1999–00	72	34	27	8	3	250	221	79	3rd West	Lost West Division semifinal
2000–01	72	30	33	8	1	262	299	69	6th West	Lost West Division semifinal
2001–02	72	21	40	6	5	235	313	53	4th U.S.	Lost Western Conference semifinal
2002–03	72	44	22	3	3	280	224	94	1st U.S.	Lost Western Conference final
2003–04	72	24	31	8	9	192	198	65	5th U.S.	Did not qualify
2004–05	72	43	24	2	3	204	144	91	1st U.S.	Lost Western Conference semifinal
2005–06	72	35	31	1	5	186	211	76	2nd U.S.	Lost Western Conference quarterfinal
2006–07	72	37	21	3	11	209	186	88	3rd U.S.	Lost Western Conference semifinal
2007–08	72	42	23	5	2	241	179	91	3rd U.S.	Lost Western Conference semifinal
2008–09	72	35	32	1	4	222	234	75	3rd U.S.	Lost Western Conference quarterfinal
2009–10	72	19	41	7	5	172	255	50	5th U.S.	Did not qualify
2010–11	72	29	37	3	3	219	285	64	5th U.S.	Did not qualify
2011–12	72	25	45	1	1	173	292	52	5th U.S.	Did not qualify
2012–13	72	24	38	7	3	210	286	58	4th U.S.	Lost Western Conference quarterfinal
2013–14	72	41	25	2	4	238	249	88	2nd U.S.	Lost Western Conference semifinal
2014–15	72	38	25	4	5	218	201	85	3rd U.S.	Lost Western Conference quarterfinal
2015–16	72	45	23	4	0	228	186	94	1st U.S.	Lost Final
2016–17	72	46	20	4	2	253	206	98	2nd U.S.	Won Ed Chynoweth Cup
2017–18	72	34	28	8	2	250	258	78	5th U.S.	Lost Western Conference quarterfinal
2018–19	68	31	29	6	2	231	245	70	5th U.S.	Lost Western Conference quarterfinal
2019–20	63	24	32	4	3	175	240	55	4th U.S.	Cancelled due to the COVID-19 pandemic
2020–21	23	10	12	0	1	67	82	21	3rd U.S.	No playoffs due to the COVID-19 pandemic
2021–22	68	44	18	4	2	271	179	94	3rd U.S.	Lost Final
2022–23	68	54	11	1	2	300	155	111	1st U.S.	Won Ed Chynoweth Cup; Lost 2023 Memorial Cup Final
2023–24	68	27	38	2	1	191	260	57	5th U.S.	Did not qualify
2024–25	68	30	33	4	1	212	257	65	5th U.S.	Lost Western Conference quarterfinal
2025–26	68	31	27	6	4	223	241	72	3rd U.S.	Lost Western Conference quarterfinal

== Championship history ==
- Ed Chynoweth Cup: 2016–17, 2022–23
- Conference titles (5): 1996–97, 2015–16, 2016–17, 2021–22, 2022–23
- Regular season Division titles (4): 2002–03, 2004–05, 2015–16, 2022–23

=== WHL Championship finals ===
- 1996–97: Loss, 0–4 vs Lethbridge Hurricanes
- 2015–16: Loss, 1–4 vs Brandon Wheat Kings
- 2016–17: Win, 4–2 vs Regina Pats
- 2021–22: Loss, 2–4 vs Edmonton Oil Kings
- 2022–23: Win, 4–1 vs Winnipeg Ice

=== Memorial Cup results ===
- 1992: Loss, 3–8 vs Kamloops Blazers (Semifinal)
- 2017: Eliminated in Round Robin
- 2023: Loss, 0–5 vs Quebec Remparts (Final)

== Players ==
=== NHL alumni ===
Several National Hockey League players started with the Thunderbirds:

- Nolan Allan
- Glenn Anderson
- Doug Barrault
- Mathew Barzal
- Ethan Bear
- Matt Berlin
- Rick Berry
- Zdenek Blatny
- Lonny Bohonos
- Landon Bow
- Jim Camazzola
- Shawn Chambers
- Ben Clymer
- Colton Dach
- Ken Daneyko
- Kimbi Daniels
- Brenden Dillon
- Peter Dineen
- Steve Dykstra
- Craig Endean
- Shane Endicott
- Brennan Evans
- Brent Fedyk
- Zack Fitzgerald
- Wade Flaherty
- Aaron Gagnon
- Steven Goertzen
- Stanislav Gron
- Dylan Guenther
- Barrett Heisten
- Riku Helenius
- Chris Herperger
- Matt Hervey
- Thomas Hickey
- Bud Holloway
- Jan Hrdina
- Tim Hunter
- Jamie Huscroft
- Scott Jackson
- Chris Joseph
- Mike Kennedy
- Alan Kerr
- Jon Klemm
- Rob Klinkhammer
- Samuel Knazko
- Keegan Kolesar
- Kevin Korchinski
- John Kordic
- Brent Krahn
- Greg Kuznik
- Brooks Laich
- Brad Lambert
- John Lilley
- Danny Lorenz
- Dwayne Lowdermilk
- Brian Lundberg
- Jamie Lundmark
- Stewart Malgunas
- Patrick Marleau
- Glenn Merkosky
- Tomas Mojzis
- David Morisset
- Petr Nedved
- Jim O'Brien
- Chris Osgood
- Mark Parrish
- Ed Patterson
- Lane Pederson
- Noah Philp
- Calvin Pickard
- Jame Pollock
- Deron Quint
- Errol Rausse
- Jeremy Reich
- Matt Rempe
- Scott Robinson
- Cody Rudkowsky
- Oleg Saprykin
- Cory Sarich
- Chris Schmidt
- Andy Schneider
- Corey Schwab
- Brent Severyn
- Mike Siklenka
- Trevor Sim
- Matthew Spiller
- Turner Stevenson
- Austin Strand
- Garret Stroshein
- Rob Tallas
- Shea Theodore
- Nate Thompson
- Denis Tolpeko
- Alexander True
- Lindsay Vallis
- Wayne Van Dorp
- Ryan Walter
- Joe Ward
- Chris Wells
- David Wilkie
- Mitch Wilson
- Brendan Witt
- Dody Wood
- Brad Zavisha

=== Retired numbers ===
#	Player	Year	Ref
10	Glen Goodall	1990	
12	Patrick Marleau	2023	

== Team records ==
Individual player records for a single season
Statistic	Player	Total	Season
Most goals	Glen Goodall	76	1989–90
Most assists	Victor Gervais	96	1989–90
Most points	Glen Goodall	163	1989–90
Most penalty minutes	Mitch Wilson	436	1981–82
Most saves (goalie)	Calvin Pickard	2,443	2010–11
Best GAA (goalie)	Bryan Bridges	1.79	2004–05
Goalies = minimum 1500 minutes played

Career records
Statistic	Player	Total	Career
Most goals	Glen Goodall	262	1984–1990
Most assists	Glen Goodall	311	1984–1990
Most points	Glen Goodall	573	1984–1990
Most penalty minutes	Phil Stanger	929	1980–1983
Most games (goalie)	Danny Lorenz	224	1986–1989
Most saves (goalie)	Calvin Pickard	7,727	2008–2012
Most shutouts (goalie)	Bryan Bridges	20	2003–2006

=== Awards ===
Four Broncos Memorial Trophy (WHL player of the year)

- Glen Goodall: 1989–90
- Cody Rudkowsky: 1998–99

Jim Piggott Memorial Trophy (WHL rookie of the year)

- Petr Nedved: 1989–90

Bill Hunter Memorial Trophy (WHL top defenceman)

- Brendan Witt: 1993–94
- Shea Theodore: 2014–15
- Ethan Bear: 2016–17

Del Wilson Trophy (WHL top goaltender)

- Danny Lorenz: 1988–89
- Cody Rudkowsky: 1998–99
- Taran Kozun: 2014–15
- Thomas Milic: 2022–23

Dunc McCallum Memorial Trophy (WHL coach of the year)

- Jack Sangster: 1981–82
- Don Nachbaur: 1994–95

Doc Seaman Trophy (WHL scholastic player of the year)

- Tyler Metcalfe: 2001–02

Brad Hornung Trophy

- Aaron Gagnon: 2006–07

WHL Playoff MVP

- Matthew Barzal: 2016–17
- Thomas Milic: 2022–23

== See also ==
- Ice hockey in Seattle
