= Rob Klinkhammer =

Canadian ice hockey player (born 1986)

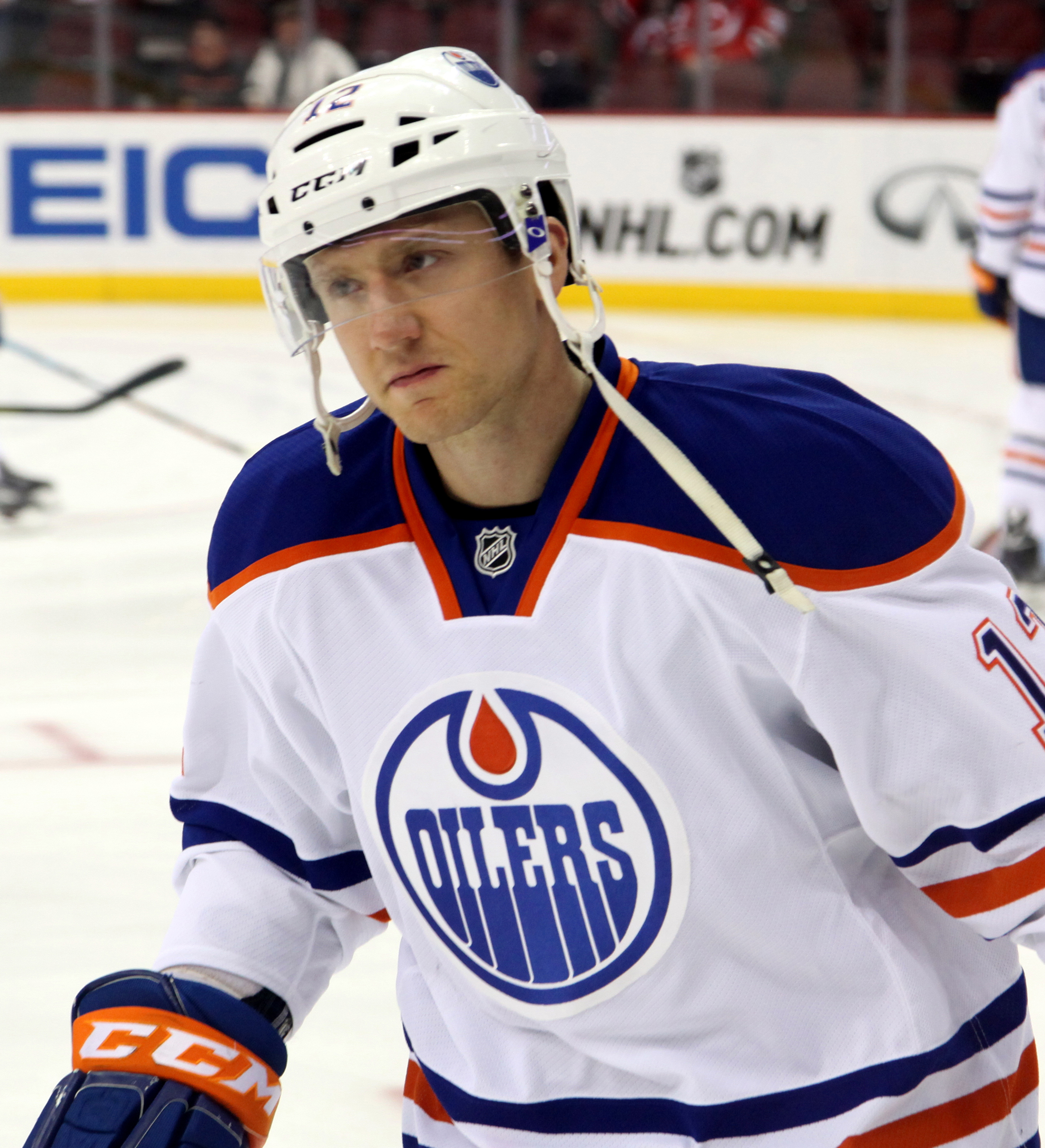
- Klinkhammer with the Edmonton Oilers in 2015
- Born: August 12, 1986 (age 40) Lethbridge, Alberta, Canada
- Height: 6 ft 3 in (191 cm)
- Weight: 216 lb (98 kg; 15 st 6 lb)
- Position: Left wing
- Shot: Left
- Played for: Chicago Blackhawks; Ottawa Senators; Arizona Coyotes; Pittsburgh Penguins; Edmonton Oilers; Dinamo Minsk; Ak Bars Kazan; Avangard Omsk; Dynamo Moscow
- National team: Canada
- NHL draft: Undrafted
- Playing career: 2007–2022

Robert Klinkhammer (born August 12, 1986) is a Canadian former professional ice hockey left winger, most recently serving as an Assistant Coach with the Rockford IceHogs of the American Hockey League. He most recently played for HC Dynamo Moscow of the Kontinental Hockey League (KHL). Klinkhammer has previously played in the National Hockey League with the Chicago Blackhawks, Ottawa Senators, Arizona Coyotes, Pittsburgh Penguins and Edmonton Oilers organizations, making his NHL debut in 2010 with the Blackhawks.

== Playing career ==
=== Amateur ===
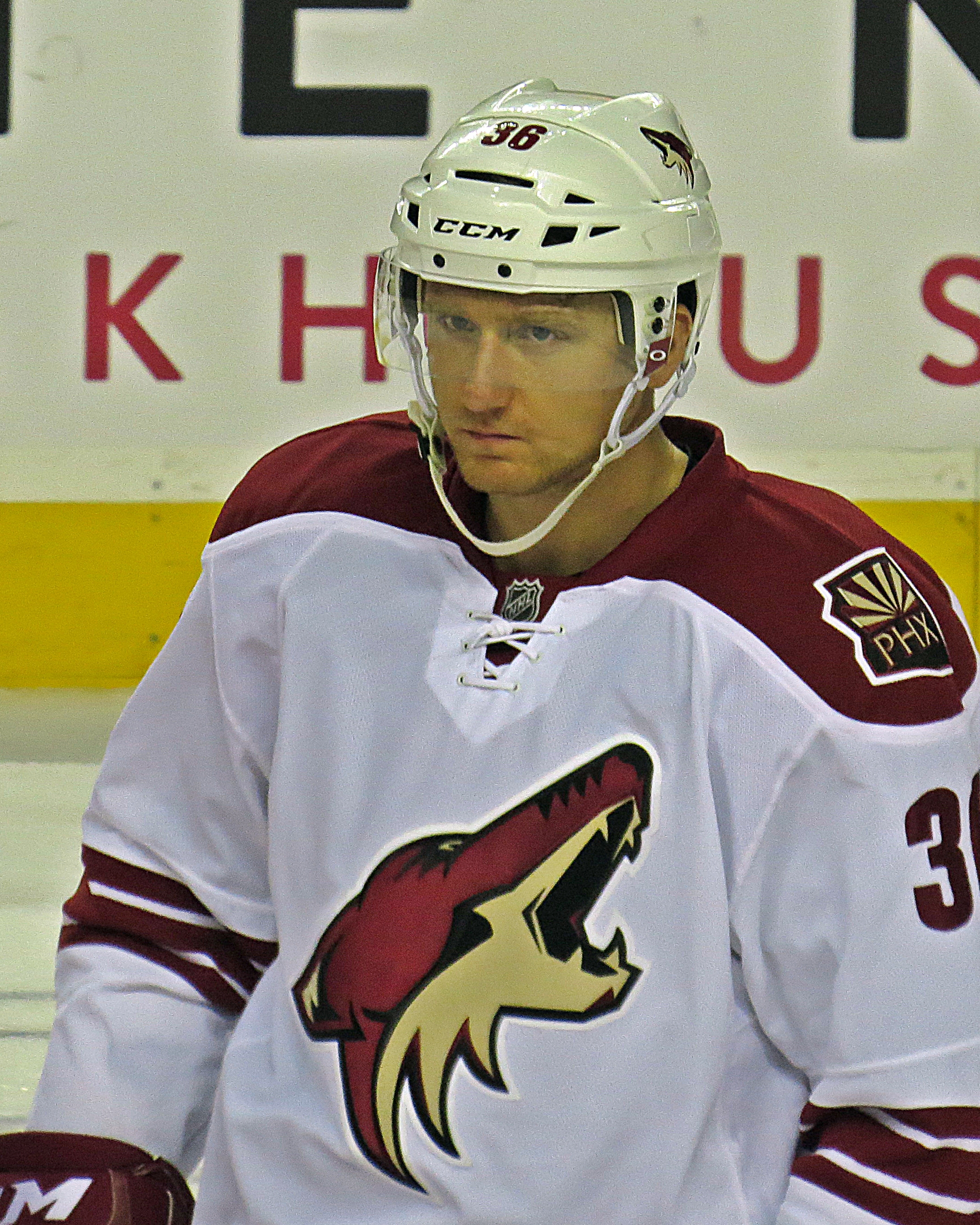
Rob Klinkhammer during his time with the Coyotes.

Klinkhammer, born in Cranbrook BC, raised in Lethbridge, played his minor hockey in town, and made the major junior ice hockey in the Western Hockey League Lethbridge Hurricanes, where he played for parts of three seasons, including one full season (2004-2005). Traded to the Seattle Thunderbirds in early 2006, he began his final season of junior eligibility with Seattle, playing one game with the team that autumn, before moving to finish his junior career with the Portland Winter Hawks and Brandon Wheat Kings, notching a junior career-best 33 goals, 40 assists for 73 points in 66 combined games. In 11 post-season games with Brandon, he had eight points after the Wheat Kings won the WHL's East Division Title, but lost in the Eastern Conference semi-finals to Calgary.

=== Professional ===
Klinkhammer played his first professional season in 2007–08 with the Norfolk Admirals of the American Hockey League (AHL). He made his professional debut on October 19, 2007, against the Binghamton Senators, providing an assist. He then scored his first career professional goal on November 23 against the Springfield Falcons, adding two assists for the Admirals' 4–2 win.

On June 8, 2009, Klinkhammer signed as a free agent with the Rockford IceHogs, the AHL affiliate of the NHL's Chicago Blackhawks, to a two-year, entry-level contract. Following an injury to Blackhawks forward Patrick Kane, Klinkhammer was recalled from Rockford to make his NHL debut on December 10, 2010, dressing for a home game win over the Dallas Stars. On July 11, 2011, Klinkhammer signed a one-year contract extension with Chicago.

On December 2, 2011, Klinkhammer was traded to the Ottawa Senators in exchange for a conditional seventh-round draft pick in 2013. He reported to the Senators' AHL affiliate, the Binghamton Senators. He played in his second NHL game, and first with the Senators, on March 4, 2012, against the Florida Panthers. After the game, Ottawa Head Coach Paul MacLean was impressed, calling Klinkhammer "one of our best players."

On July 3, 2012, Klinkhammer signed as a free agent with the Phoenix Coyotes. With the 2012–13 NHL lockout in effect, however, he was assigned to the team's AHL affiliate, the Portland Pirates. He scored his first career hat-trick October 23, 2012. When the lockout was resolved in January 2013, Klinkhammer remained with Portland, though he was eventually recalled to the Coyotes, later earning the nickname "The Colonel" after his surname's resemblance to the fictional character Colonel Klink's from the TV sitcom Hogan's Heroes.

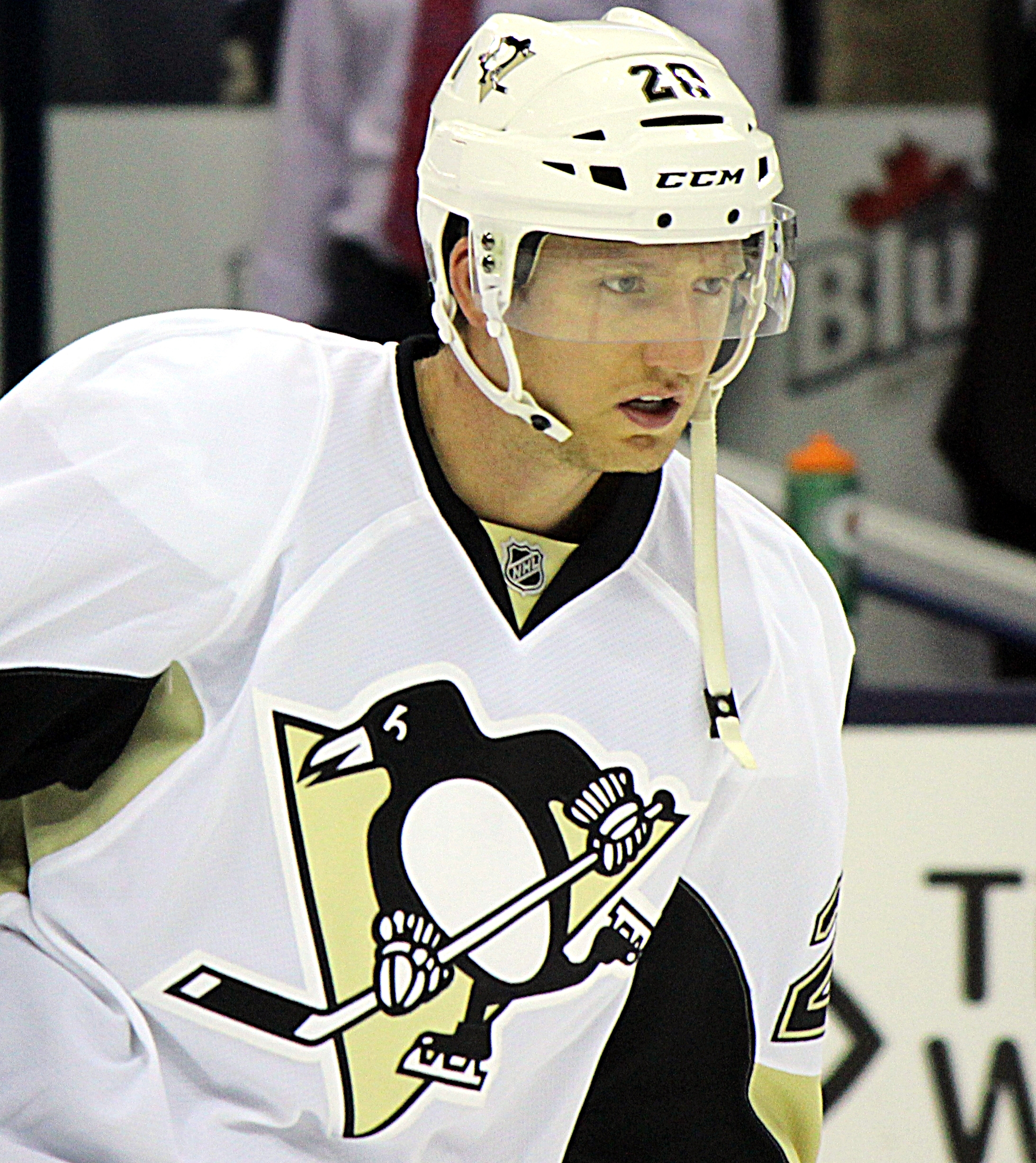
Klinkhammer in December 2014.

On December 5, 2014, Klinkhammer, along with a conditional fifth-round pick in 2016, was traded to the Pittsburgh Penguins in exchange for defenceman Philip Samuelsson.

On January 2, 2015, Klinkhammer and a first-round pick in 2015 were traded to the Edmonton Oilers in exchange for David Perron. On January 6, Klinkhammer landed a blindside-hit on Detroit Red Wings forward Johan Franzén, causing the latter a severe concussion that ended his career. On February 20, Klinkhammer signed a one-year, $650,000 contract extension with the Oilers, keeping him with the organization through to the conclusion of the 2015–16 season. He finished the 2014–15 season with five goals and four assists from 69 games split between the Coyotes, Penguins and Oilers.

After 6 seasons in the NHL, Klinkhammer opted to sign as a free agent to a two-year deal with Belarusian club, HC Dinamo Minsk of the KHL on June 17, 2016.

In Game 5 of the 2018 Gagarin Cup Final against CSKA Moscow, Klinkhammer scored the game-winning goal for Ak Bars Kazan, allowing them to win the Gagarin Cup for the third time since KHL's inception.

On July 25, 2020, Klinkhammer continued his career in the KHL, returning to Belarusian club, Dinamo Minsk, as a free agent on a one-year contract. In the following 2020–21 season, Klinkhammer captained the club in registering 15 goals and 26 points in just 31 games to help return Minsk to the post-season.

As a free agent, Klinkhammer opted to continue his career by playing a seventh season in the KHL, agreeing to a one-year contract with HC Dynamo Moscow on 27 July 2021.

== International play ==
Medal record

Representing Canada

Ice hockey

Olympic Games
| Bronze medal – third place | 2018 Pyeongchang | |

During the 2017–18 season, Klinkhammer was selected to represent Canada at the 2018 Winter Olympics in Pyeongchang, South Korea. Used in a checking-line role, Klinkhammer contributed with 2 assists in 6 games to help Canada claim the Bronze medal.

== Personal life ==
Parents Gerry Klinkhammer and Colleen Klinkhammer (née Hnatowski). Gerry was a member of the WIHL Nelson Maple Leafs from 1973-1975 and the Cranbrook Royals from 1975-1982. The Royals were the 1981-82 Allan Cup senior men's champions. Gerry later became a scout for the Lethbridge Hurricanes after Rob was in the NHL. Klinkhammer missed two games in 2015 to attend the birth of his child Gunnar Knox, with his wife Jessica. On his retirement from the KHL in 2022, he first took a coaching position in his hometown of Lethbridge with the Lethbridge United Under-15 team in the Junior Prospects Hockey League, before taking his present position with Rockford in August 2022.

== Career statistics ==
=== Regular season and playoffs ===
| | | | Regular season | | | | | Playoffs |
| Season | Team | League | GP | G | A | Pts | PIM | GP | G | A | Pts | PIM |
|---|---|---|---|---|---|---|---|---|---|---|---|---|
| 2002–03 | Lethbridge Y Men AAA | AMHL | 36 | 5 | 8 | 13 | 84 | — | — | — | — | — |
| 2003–04 | Lethbridge Y Men AAA | AMHL | 29 | 20 | 22 | 42 | 114 | — | — | — | — | — |
| 2003–04 | Lethbridge Hurricanes | WHL | 25 | 2 | 3 | 5 | 12 | — | — | — | — | — |
| 2004–05 | Lethbridge Hurricanes | WHL | 72 | 14 | 12 | 26 | 81 | 5 | 0 | 1 | 1 | 4 |
| 2005–06 | Lethbridge Hurricanes | WHL | 35 | 5 | 7 | 12 | 15 | — | — | — | — | — |
| 2005–06 | Seattle Thunderbirds | WHL | 32 | 3 | 5 | 8 | 37 | 7 | 0 | 1 | 1 | 6 |
| 2006–07 | Seattle Thunderbirds | WHL | 1 | 0 | 0 | 0 | 9 | — | — | — | — | — |
| 2006–07 | Portland Winter Hawks | WHL | 37 | 23 | 19 | 42 | 70 | — | — | — | — | — |
| 2006–07 | Brandon Wheat Kings | WHL | 28 | 10 | 21 | 31 | 29 | 11 | 4 | 4 | 8 | 22 |
| 2007–08 | Norfolk Admirals | AHL | 66 | 12 | 12 | 24 | 41 | — | — | — | — | — |
| 2008–09 | Rockford IceHogs | AHL | 76 | 15 | 18 | 33 | 32 | 4 | 0 | 1 | 1 | 0 |
| 2009–10 | Rockford IceHogs | AHL | 72 | 10 | 14 | 24 | 38 | 4 | 1 | 1 | 2 | 7 |
| 2010–11 | Rockford IceHogs | AHL | 76 | 17 | 29 | 46 | 63 | — | — | — | — | — |
| 2010–11 | Chicago Blackhawks | NHL | 1 | 0 | 0 | 0 | 0 | — | — | — | — | — |
| 2011–12 | Rockford IceHogs | AHL | 18 | 2 | 4 | 6 | 6 | — | — | — | — | — |
| 2011–12 | Binghamton Senators | AHL | 35 | 12 | 23 | 35 | 30 | — | — | — | — | — |
| 2011–12 | Ottawa Senators | NHL | 15 | 0 | 2 | 2 | 2 | — | — | — | — | — |
| 2012–13 | Portland Pirates | AHL | 53 | 14 | 30 | 44 | 36 | — | — | — | — | — |
| 2012–13 | Phoenix Coyotes | NHL | 22 | 5 | 6 | 11 | 10 | — | — | — | — | — |
| 2013–14 | Phoenix Coyotes | NHL | 72 | 11 | 9 | 20 | 19 | — | — | — | — | — |
| 2014–15 | Arizona Coyotes | NHL | 19 | 3 | 0 | 3 | 4 | — | — | — | — | — |
| 2014–15 | Pittsburgh Penguins | NHL | 10 | 1 | 2 | 3 | 0 | — | — | — | — | — |
| 2014–15 | Edmonton Oilers | NHL | 40 | 1 | 2 | 3 | 23 | — | — | — | — | — |
| 2015–16 | Edmonton Oilers | NHL | 14 | 1 | 0 | 1 | 6 | — | — | — | — | — |
| 2015–16 | Bakersfield Condors | AHL | 27 | 14 | 10 | 24 | 36 | — | — | — | — | — |
| 2016–17 | Dinamo Minsk | KHL | 47 | 21 | 21 | 42 | 65 | 5 | 1 | 1 | 2 | 0 |
| 2017–18 | Dinamo Minsk | KHL | 7 | 1 | 1 | 2 | 27 | — | — | — | — | — |
| 2017–18 | Ak Bars Kazan | KHL | 42 | 7 | 13 | 20 | 32 | 19 | 3 | 5 | 8 | 10 |
| 2018–19 | Ak Bars Kazan | KHL | 57 | 19 | 5 | 24 | 79 | 4 | 1 | 0 | 1 | 8 |
| 2019–20 | Avangard Omsk | KHL | 44 | 12 | 15 | 27 | 57 | — | — | — | — | — |
| 2020–21 | Dinamo Minsk | KHL | 31 | 15 | 11 | 26 | 38 | 5 | 0 | 0 | 0 | 8 |
| 2021–22 | Dynamo Moscow | KHL | 41 | 6 | 10 | 16 | 28 | 4 | 0 | 1 | 1 | 2 |
| NHL totals | | | 193 | 22 | 21 | 43 | 64 | — | — | — | — | — |
| KHL totals | | | 269 | 81 | 76 | 157 | 326 | 37 | 5 | 7 | 12 | 28 |

=== International ===
| Year | Team | Event | Result | GP | G | A | Pts | PIM |
|---|---|---|---|---|---|---|---|---|
| 2018 | Canada | OG | 3rd place, bronze medalist(s) | 6 | 0 | 2 | 2 | 2 |
| Senior totals | | | | 6 | 0 | 2 | 2 | 2 |

== Awards and honours ==
| Award | Year | Ref |
KHL
| Gagarin Cup (Ak Bars Kazan) | 2018 | |
