= Wes Walz =

Canadian ice hockey player and coach

- Born: May 17, 1970 (age 56) Calgary, Alberta, Canada
- Height: 5 ft 11 in (180 cm)
- Weight: 190 lb (86 kg; 13 st 8 lb)
- Position: Centre
- Shot: Right
- Played for: Boston Bruins; Philadelphia Flyers; Calgary Flames; Detroit Red Wings; EV Zug; HC Lugano; Minnesota Wild
- National team: Canada
- NHL draft: 57th overall, 1989; Boston Bruins
- Playing career: 1990–2007
- Coaching career: 2008–2017

Wes Walz (born May 15, 1970) is a Canadian former professional ice hockey centre and coach. During his career, he was captain of the Minnesota Wild. He also played for the Boston Bruins, Philadelphia Flyers, Calgary Flames, and Detroit Red Wings. Walz had 260 points (109 goals, 151 assists), 343 penalty minutes, and earned 40 career multi-point games.

== Playing career ==
Walz was drafted 57th overall by the Boston Bruins in the 1989 NHL entry draft. At the time, he was playing for the Lethbridge Hurricanes of the Western Hockey League (WHL), a team for which he played two seasons, playing 119 games and scoring 83 goals and 161 assists for 244 points. For the next seven seasons, Walz played in the secondary American Hockey League (AHL). He averaged over one point per game in the AHL and was named MVP of the 1996 AHL All-Star Game. Walz scored his first NHL goal on February 20, 1990, in Boston's 5-3 win at Calgary. He scored a career-high 38 points in 53 games for the Calgary Flames in 1993–94, but in 1996, he left North America to play in Switzerland's National League A (NLA).

After four seasons in Switzerland, Walz returned to the NHL, signing a contract with expansion franchise Minnesota Wild. During training camp for the Wild, Wild Head Coach Jacques Lemaire dubbed Walz his designated checker, placing him on the checking line. This was a turning point in Walz's career. In his first season back, Walz played all 82 regular season games, scoring 18 goals, 7 of which were shorthanded. When the Wild made the playoffs in 2003, Walz played a significant role in helping the team get to the Western Conference Finals, scoring 7 goals and 6 assists in 18 games.

On December 1, 2007, the Wild held a press conference during which Walz announced his retirement. Walz retired as the franchise's leader in all-time games played at that time.

== Coaching career ==
In June 2008, Walz signed a three-year contract to become an assistant coach with the Tampa Bay Lightning, under Head Coach Barry Melrose. Though Melrose was fired only 16 games into his tenure with the Lightning, Walz was retained as a member of the coaching staff under new Head Coach Rick Tocchet. During his tenure in Tampa Bay, Tocchet asked Walz to personally tutor first overall draft pick Steven Stamkos. In an interview, Stamkos told the Minneapolis Star-Tribune, "It was pretty special that he took the time to work with me and make me a better player, and I'm thankful for it."

In February 2010, Lightning general manager Brian Lawton informed Walz he was being replaced by Jim Johnson, then Head Coach of the Lightning's AHL affiliate, the Norfolk Admirals. In turn, Lawton offered Walz the opportunity to take Johnson's place as Head Coach of the Admirals. When Walz declined due to family reasons, Lawton dismissed him from the organization. Later, it was revealed Lawton made the change without consulting Tocchet.

== Personal life ==
Since 2023, Walz has worked as a sports analyst on Fox Sports North for the Minnesota Wild. He and his wife Kerry-Anne have five children together.

Walz volunteered as Head Coach with the Raptors of East Ridge High School in Woodbury, Minnesota. There he coached his son, Kelvin, on the boys Varsity ice hockey team, and a few years later he coached his daughter, Jaedyn, on the girls Varsity hockey team. In 2017, after 3 years of coaching Walz resigns from East Ridge citing he wanted to spend more time with his family at home.

== Career statistics ==
=== Regular season and playoffs ===
			Regular season					Playoffs
Season	Team	League	GP	G	A	Pts	PIM	GP	G	A	Pts	PIM
1987–88	Prince Albert Raiders	WHL	1	1	1	2	0	—	—	—	—	—
1988–89	Lethbridge Hurricanes	WHL	63	29	75	104	32	8	1	5	6	6
1989–90	Boston Bruins	NHL	2	1	1	2	0	—	—	—	—	—
1989–90	Lethbridge Hurricanes	WHL	56	54	86	140	69	19	13	24	37	33
1990–91	Boston Bruins	NHL	56	8	8	16	32	2	0	0	0	0
1990–91	Maine Mariners	AHL	20	8	12	20	19	2	0	0	0	21
1991–92	Boston Bruins	NHL	15	0	3	3	12	—	—	—	—	—
1991–92	Philadelphia Flyers	NHL	2	1	0	1	0	—	—	—	—	—
1991–92	Maine Mariners	AHL	21	13	11	24	38	—	—	—	—	—
1991–92	Hershey Bears	AHL	41	13	28	41	37	6	1	2	3	0
1992–93	Hershey Bears	AHL	78	35	45	80	106	—	—	—	—	—
1993–94	Calgary Flames	NHL	53	11	27	38	16	6	3	0	3	2
1993–94	Saint John Flames	AHL	15	6	6	12	14	—	—	—	—	—
1994–95	Calgary Flames	NHL	39	6	12	18	11	1	0	0	0	0
1995–96	Detroit Red Wings	NHL	2	0	0	0	0	—	—	—	—	—
1995–96	Adirondack Red Wings	AHL	38	20	35	55	58	—	—	—	—	—
1996–97	EV Zug	NLA	41	24	22	46	67	—	—	—	—	—
1997–98	EV Zug	NLA	38	18	34	52	32	—	—	—	—	—
1998–99	EV Zug	NLA	42	22	27	49	75	—	—	—	—	—
1999–00	HC Lugano	NLA	13	7	11	18	14	—	—	—	—	—
1999–00	Long Beach Ice Dogs	IHL	6	4	3	7	8	—	—	—	—	—
2000–01	Minnesota Wild	NHL	82	18	12	30	37	—	—	—	—	—
2001–02	Minnesota Wild	NHL	64	10	20	30	43	—	—	—	—	—
2002–03	Minnesota Wild	NHL	80	13	19	32	63	18	7	6	13	14
2003–04	Minnesota Wild	NHL	57	12	13	25	32	—	—	—	—	—
2005–06	Minnesota Wild	NHL	82	19	18	37	61	—	—	—	—	—
2006–07	Minnesota Wild	NHL	62	9	15	24	30	5	0	1	1	4
2007–08	Minnesota Wild	NHL	11	1	3	4	6	—	—	—	—	—
NHL totals			607	109	151	260	343	32	10	7	17	20

== Awards ==
- WHL East First All-Star Team – 1990

Preceded by Scott Pellerin; Brian Rolston	Minnesota Wild captain December 2000; March/April 2006	Succeeded by Brad Bombardir; Brian Rolston
