= Kevin Haller =

Canadian ice hockey player (born 1970)

- Born: December 5, 1970 (age 55) Trochu, Alberta, Canada
- Height: 6 ft 2 in (188 cm)
- Weight: 195 lb (88 kg; 13 st 13 lb)
- Position: Defence
- Shot: Left
- Played for: Buffalo Sabres; Montreal Canadiens; Philadelphia Flyers; Hartford Whalers; Carolina Hurricanes; Mighty Ducks of Anaheim; New York Islanders
- National team: Canada
- NHL draft: 14th overall, 1989; Buffalo Sabres
- Playing career: 1990–2002

Kevin Wade Haller (born December 5, 1970) is a Canadian former professional ice hockey defenceman who played 13 seasons in the National Hockey League (NHL) with seven teams between 1990 and 2002. He won the Stanley Cup in 1993 while with the Montreal Canadiens. Internationally Haller played for the Canadian national junior team, winning a gold medal at the 1990 World Junior Championships.

== Playing career ==
Haller played junior for the Regina Pats of the Western Hockey League. He was drafted by the Buffalo Sabres in the first round (14th overall) of the 1989 NHL entry draft from the Regina Pats. Throughout his career he played for Buffalo, the Montreal Canadiens, Philadelphia Flyers, Hartford Whalers/Carolina Hurricanes, Mighty Ducks of Anaheim and New York Islanders. Haller won the Stanley Cup with the Canadiens in 1993, however, injuries forced his early retirement in 2002 at the age of 32.

== International play ==
Haller was a member of the Canadian national junior team at the 1990 World Junior Championships, where Canada won gold. He had four points in seven games.

== Personal life ==
Haller is a practicing Christian, and resides in Calgary with his wife and four daughters, where he works as a real estate agent.

== Career statistics ==
=== Regular season and playoffs ===
			Regular season					Playoffs
Season	Team	League	GP	G	A	Pts	PIM	GP	G	A	Pts	PIM
1987–88	Olds Grizzlys	AJHL	51	13	31	44	66	—	—	—	—	—
1987–88	Regina Pats	WHL	5	0	1	1	2	4	1	1	2	2
1988–89	Regina Pats	WHL	72	10	31	41	99	—	—	—	—	—
1989–90	Regina Pats	WHL	58	16	37	53	93	11	2	9	11	16
1989–90	Buffalo Sabres	NHL	2	0	0	0	0	—	—	—	—	—
1990–91	Buffalo Sabres	NHL	21	1	8	9	20	6	1	4	5	10
1990–91	Rochester Americans	AHL	52	2	8	10	53	10	2	1	3	6
1991–92	Buffalo Sabres	NHL	58	6	15	21	75	—	—	—	—	—
1991–92	Rochester Americans	AHL	4	0	0	0	18	—	—	—	—	—
1991–92	Montreal Canadiens	NHL	8	2	2	4	17	9	0	0	0	6
1992–93	Montreal Canadiens	NHL	73	11	14	25	117	17	1	6	7	16
1993–94	Montreal Canadiens	NHL	68	4	9	13	118	7	1	1	2	19
1994–95	Philadelphia Flyers	NHL	36	2	8	10	48	15	4	4	8	10
1995–96	Philadelphia Flyers	NHL	69	5	9	14	92	6	0	1	1	8
1996–97	Philadelphia Flyers	NHL	27	0	5	5	37	—	—	—	—	—
1996–97	Hartford Whalers	NHL	35	2	6	8	48	—	—	—	—	—
1997–98	Carolina Hurricanes	NHL	65	3	5	8	94	—	—	—	—	—
1998–99	Mighty Ducks of Anaheim	NHL	82	1	6	7	122	4	0	0	0	2
1999–2000	Mighty Ducks of Anaheim	NHL	67	3	5	8	61	—	—	—	—	—
2000–01	New York Islanders	NHL	30	1	5	6	56	—	—	—	—	—
2001–02	New York Islanders	NHL	1	0	0	0	2	—	—	—	—	—
NHL totals			642	41	97	138	907	64	7	16	23	71

=== International ===
Year	Team	Event	GP	G	A	Pts	PIM
1990	Canada	WJC	7	2	2	4	8
Junior totals			7	2	2	4	8

== Awards ==
- WHL East First All-Star Team – 1990

Preceded by Joel Savage	Buffalo Sabres first-round draft pick 1989	Succeeded by Brad May
