= Danny Lorenz =

Canadian ice hockey player

- Born: December 12, 1969 (age 56) Murrayville, British Columbia, Canada
- Height: 5 ft 10 in (178 cm)
- Weight: 185 lb (84 kg; 13 st 3 lb)
- Position: Goaltender
- Caught: Left
- Played for: New York Islanders
- NHL draft: 58th overall, 1988; New York Islanders
- Playing career: 1989–2004

Danny Lorenz (born December 12, 1969) is a Canadian former professional ice hockey goaltender. He was drafted in the third round of the 1988 NHL entry draft and played in eight National Hockey League games for the New York Islanders from 1990 to 1993. The rest of his career, which lasted from 1989 to 2004, was mainly spent in various minor leagues. After his playing career Lorenz became a youth hockey director of the Kent Valley Hockey Association in Kent, Washington. He was replaced as head coach of the Seattle Ravens in the Northern Pacific Hockey League by Adam Kurtenbach in 2016.

== Career statistics ==
=== Regular season and playoffs ===
			Regular season									Playoffs
Season	Team	League	GP	W	L	T	MIN	GA	SO	GAA	SV%	GP	W	L	MIN	GA	SO	GAA	SV%
1986–87	Seattle Thunderbirds	WHL	38	12	21	2	2103	199	0	5.68	—	—	—	—	—	—	—	—	—
1987–88	Seattle Thunderbirds	WHL	62	20	37	2	3302	314	0	5.71	—	—	—	—	—	—	—	—	—
1988–89	Springfield Indians	AHL	4	2	1	0	210	12	0	3.43	.885	—	—	—	—	—	—	—	—
1988–89	Seattle Thunderbirds	WHL	68	31	33	4	4003	240	3	3.60	.899	—	—	—	—	—	—	—	—
1989–90	Seattle Thunderbirds	WHL	56	37	15	2	3226	221	0	4.11	.887	13	6	7	751	40	0	3.21	—
1990–91	New York Islanders	NHL	2	0	1	0	80	5	0	3.75	.861	—	—	—	—	—	—	—	—
1990–91	Capital District Islanders	AHL	17	5	9	2	940	70	0	4.47	.862	—	—	—	—	—	—	—	—
1990–91	Richmond Renegades	ECHL	20	6	9	2	1020	75	0	4ю41	.879	—	—	—	—	—	—	—	—
1991–92	New York Islanders	NHL	2	0	2	0	120	10	0	5.02	.833	—	—	—	—	—	—	—	—
1991–92	Capital District Islanders	AHL	53	22	22	7	3050	181	2	3.56	.886	7	3	4	442	25	0	3.39	—
1992–93	New York Islanders	NHL	4	1	2	0	157	10	0	3.82	.872	—	—	—	—	—	—	—	—
1992–93	Capital District Islanders	AHL	44	16	17	5	2412	146	1	3.63	.888	4	0	3	219	12	0	3.29	—
1993–94	Salt Lake Golden Eagles	IHL	20	4	12	0	982	91	0	5.56	.848	—	—	—	—	—	—	—	—
1993–94	Springfield Indians	AHL	14	5	7	1	801	59	0	4.42	.850	2	0	0	35	0	0	0.00	1.000
1994–95	Cincinnati Cyclones	IHL	41	24	10	3	2222	126	0	3.40	.895	5	2	3	308	16	0	3.12	—
1995–96	Cincinnati Cyclones	IHL	46	28	12	5	2694	139	1	3.10	.899	5	1	2	199	11	0	3.31	—
1996–97	Milwaukee Admirals	IHL	67	33	27	6	3903	221	0	3.40	.891	3	0	3	187	11	0	3.53	—
1997–98	Milwaukee Admirals	IHL	54	28	18	4	2718	140	0	3.09	.887	10	5	5	622	31	1	2.99	—
1998–99	Adler Mannheim	DEL	22	—	—	—	1051	54	2	3.08	.890	—	—	—	—	—	—	—	—
1998–99	Houston Aeros	IHL	7	3	2	2	418	13	0	1.87	.929	1	0	0	38	2	0	3.16	.800
1999–00	Tallahassee Tiger Sharks	ECHL	33	15	12	2	1749	105	0	3.60	.892	—	—	—	—	—	—	—	—
1999–00	Tacoma Sabercats	WCHL	2	2	0	0	120	2	1	1.00	.953	—	—	—	—	—	—	—	—
1999–00	Rochester Americans	AHL	4	0	2	1	168	15	0	5.36	.845	—	—	—	—	—	—	—	—
2000–01	Tacoma Sabercats	WCHL	54	23	25	6	3111	162	3	3.12	.896	3	1	2	179	11	0	3.68	—
2001–02	Nottingham Panthers	BISL	46	—	—	—	2633	122	0	2.78	.910	5	—	—	—	—	—	3.24	.897
2002–03	Guildford Flames	BNL	12	—	—	—	—	—	—	3.85	.865	—	—	—	—	—	—	—	—
2002–03	Newcastle Vipers	BNL	16	—	—	—	—	—	—	4.27	.871	6	—	—	—	—	—	3.33	.906
2003–04	New Mexico Scorpions	CHL	32	17	10	3	1792	100	0	3.35	.896	—	—	—	—	—	—	—	—
NHL totals			8	1	5	0	357	25	0	4.20	.856	—	—	—	—	—	—	—	—

== Awards ==
- WHL West First All-Star Team – 1989 & 1990
