= Brandy Semchuk =

Canadian ice hockey player

- Born: September 22, 1971 (age 55) Calgary, Alberta, Canada
- Height: 6 ft 1 in (185 cm)
- Weight: 185 lb (84 kg; 13 st 3 lb)
- Position: Right wing
- Shot: Right
- Played for: NHL; Los Angeles Kings; AHL; New Haven Nighthawks; ECHL; Raleigh Icecaps; Erie Panthers; Nashville Knights; IHL; Phoenix Roadrunners; CHL; San Antonio Iguanas; Columbus Cottonmouths; WCHL; Fresno Fighting Falcons; Fresno Falcons; WPHL; Shreveport Mudbugs; Other; Lethbridge Hurricanes (WHL)
- National team: Canada
- NHL draft: 28th overall, 1990; Los Angeles Kings
- Playing career: 1990–1999

Thomas "Brandy" Semchuk (born September 22, 1971) is a Canadian former professional ice hockey player. He played in the NHL with the Los Angeles Kings during the 1992–93 NHL season. Semchuk was selected in the 2nd round (28th overall) in the 1990 NHL entry draft by the Los Angeles Kings.

Semchuk played two seasons (1988–1990) on the Canada men's national ice hockey team under head coach Dave King. Prior to turning professional, Semchuk played 14 games in the WHL with the Lethbridge Hurricanes.

Semchuk also played in the AHL, ECHL, IHL, CHL, and later in the WCHL and WPHL. He was the head coach of the Fresno Monsters but is now retired.

== Career statistics ==
=== Regular season and playoffs ===
			Regular season					Playoffs
Season	Team	League	GP	G	A	Pts	PIM	GP	G	A	Pts	PIM
1985–86	Calgary Mustangs	AMHL	65	55	50	105	90	—	—	—	—	—
1986–87	Calgary Mustangs	AMHL	70	52	55	107	100	—	—	—	—	—
1987–88	Calgary Canucks	AJHL	90	44	42	86	120	—	—	—	—	—
1990–91	New Haven Nighthawks	AHL	21	1	4	5	6	—	—	—	—	—
1990–91	Lethbridge Hurricanes	WHL	14	9	8	17	10	15	8	5	13	18
1991–92	Phoenix Roadrunners	IHL	15	1	5	6	6	—	—	—	—	—
1991–92	Raleigh IceCaps	ECHL	5	1	2	3	16	2	1	0	1	4
1992–93	Los Angeles Kings	NHL	1	0	0	0	2	—	—	—	—	—
1992–93	Phoenix Roadrunners	IHL	56	13	12	25	58	—	—	—	—	—
1993–94	Erie Panthers	ECHL	44	17	15	32	37	—	—	—	—	—
1993–94	Phoenix Roadrunners	IHL	2	0	0	0	6	—	—	—	—	—
1994–95	Nashville Knights	ECHL	9	3	2	5	2	—	—	—	—	—
1994–95	San Antonio Iguanas	CHL	30	18	16	34	34	13	1	5	6	33
1995–96	San Antonio Iguanas	CHL	12	5	2	7	43	—	—	—	—	—
1996–97	San Antonio Iguanas	CHL	10	4	6	10	2	—	—	—	—	—
1996–97	Columbus Cottonmouths	CHL	13	5	5	10	8	3	0	1	1	12
1997–98	Bossier-Shreveport Mudbugs	WPHL	34	20	11	31	33	—	—	—	—	—
1997–98	Fresno Falcons	WCHL	25	20	18	38	21	5	2	3	5	0
1998–99	Fresno Falcons	WCHL	39	10	11	21	40	—	—	—	—	—
AHL totals			721	1	4	5	6	—	—	—	—	—
NHL totals			1	0	0	0	2	—	—	—	—	—
