= 1989–90 WHL season =

Junior ice hockey season

- League: Western Hockey League
- Sport: Ice hockey
- Teams: 14

Regular season
- Scotty Munro Memorial Trophy: Kamloops Blazers (3)
- Season MVP: Glen Goodall (Seattle Thunderbirds)
- Top scorer: Len Barrie (Kamloops Blazers)

Playoffs
- Finals champions: Kamloops Blazers (3)
- Runners-up: Lethbridge Hurricanes

WHL seasons
- 1988–89 1990–91

1989–90 CHL season
- League: Canadian Hockey League
- Sport: Ice hockey
- Teams: 40

OHL

QMJHL

WHL

Memorial Cup
- Finals champions: Oshawa Generals (OHL) (4th title)
- Runners-up: Kitchener Rangers (OHL)

The 1989–90 WHL season was the 24th season of the Western Hockey League (WHL). Fourteen teams completed a 72-game season. For the second time in franchise history, the Kamloops Blazers captured both the Scotty Munro Memorial Trophy and the President's Cup in the same season—they last accomplished the feat in the 1983–84 season.

== Regular season ==
=== Final standings ===
East Division
Pos	Team	Pld	W	L	T	GF	GA	Pts
1	x – Lethbridge Hurricanes	72	51	17	4	465	270	106
2	x – Prince Albert Raiders	72	38	33	1	301	293	77
3	x – Regina Pats	72	34	31	7	332	329	75
4	x – Saskatoon Blades	72	33	34	5	325	354	71
5	x – Medicine Hat Tigers	72	32	38	2	298	331	66
6	x – Swift Current Broncos	72	29	39	4	323	351	62
7	Brandon Wheat Kings	72	28	38	6	276	325	62
8	Moose Jaw Warriors	72	28	41	3	287	330	59

x – qualified for playoffs

West Division
Pos	Team	Pld	W	L	T	GF	GA	Pts
1	x – Kamloops Blazers	72	56	16	0	484	278	112
2	x – Seattle Thunderbirds	72	52	17	3	444	295	107
3	x – Tri-City Americans	72	39	28	5	433	354	83
4	x – Spokane Chiefs	72	30	37	5	334	344	65
5	Portland Winter Hawks	72	24	45	3	322	426	51
6	Victoria Cougars	72	5	65	2	221	565	12

x – qualified for playoffs

=== Scoring leaders ===
Note: GP = Games played; G = Goals; A = Assists; Pts = Points; PIM = Penalties in minutes

Player	Team	GP	G	A	Pts	PIM
Len Barrie	Kamloops Blazers	70	85	100	185	108
Glen Goodall	Seattle Thunderbirds	67	76	87	163	83
Victor Gervais	Seattle Thunderbirds	69	64	96	160	180
Phil Huber	Kamloops Blazers	72	63	89	152	176
Brian Sakic	Tri-City Americans	66	53	99	152	12
Petr Nedved	Seattle Thunderbirds	71	65	80	145	80
Stu Barnes	Tri-City Americans	63	52	92	144	165
Corey Lyons	Lethbridge Hurricanes	72	63	79	142	26
Wes Walz	Lethbridge Hurricanes	56	54	86	140	69
Bryan Bosch	Lethbridge Hurricanes	72	48	90	138	34

== 1990 WHL Playoffs ==
=== First round ===
- Swift Current defeated Brandon 5–4 OT in sixth place tie-breaker game.
- Lethbridge and Prince Albert earn byes to Division Semifinals.
- Regina defeated Swift Current 3 games to 1.
- Saskatoon defeated Medicine Hat 3 games to 0.

=== Division Semifinals ===
- Lethbridge defeated Saskatoon 4 games to 3.
- Prince Albert defeated Regina 4 games to 3.
- Kamloops defeated Spokane 5 games to 1.
- Seattle defeated Tri-City 5 games to 2.

=== Division Finals ===
- Lethbridge defeated Prince Albert 4 games to 3.
- Kamloops defeated Seattle 5 games to 1.

=== WHL Championship ===
- Kamloops defeated Lethbridge 4 games to 1.

== All-Star game ==
On January 26, the East Division defeated the West Division 9–6 at Kennewick, Washington before a crowd of 5,059.

== WHL awards ==
Most Valuable Player - Four Broncos Memorial Trophy: Glen Goodall, Seattle Thunderbirds
Scholastic Player of the Year - Daryl K. (Doc) Seaman Trophy: Jeff Nelson, Prince Albert Raiders
Top Scorer - Bob Clarke Trophy: Len Barrie, Kamloops Blazers
Most Sportsmanlike Player - Brad Hornung Trophy: Bryan Bosch, Lethbridge Hurricanes
Top Defenseman - Bill Hunter Trophy: Kevin Haller, Regina Pats
Rookie of the Year - Jim Piggott Memorial Trophy: Petr Nedved, Seattle Thunderbirds
Top Goaltender - Del Wilson Trophy: Trevor Kidd, Brandon Wheat Kings
Coach of the Year - Dunc McCallum Memorial Trophy: Ken Hitchcock, Kamloops Blazers
Executive of the Year - Lloyd Saunders Memorial Trophy: Russ Farwell, Seattle Thunderbirds
Regular Season Champions - Scotty Munro Memorial Trophy: Kamloops Blazers
Marketing/Public Relations Award - St. Clair Group Trophy: Jeff Chynoweth, Lethbridge Hurricanes
WHL Plus-Minus Award: Len Barrie, Kamloops Blazers

== All-Star teams ==
East Division
	First Team		Second Team	
Goal	Trevor Kidd	Brandon Wheat Kings	Dusty Imoo	Lethbridge Hurricanes
Defense	Kevin Haller	Regina Pats	Scott Humeniuk	Moose Jaw Warriors
Defense	Dan Lambert	Swift Current Broncos	Todd Nelson	Prince Albert Raiders
Center	Wes Walz	Lethbridge Hurricanes	Mike Sillinger	Regina Pats
Left Wing	Troy Mick	Regina Pats	Kelly Ens	Lethbridge Hurricanes
Right Wing	Mark Greig	Lethbridge Hurricanes	Jackson Penney	Prince Albert Raiders
West Division
	First Team		Second Team	
Goal	Danny Lorenz	Seattle Thunderbirds	Corey Hirsch	Kamloops Blazers
Defense	Darryl Sydor	Kamloops Blazers	Cam Brauer	Seattle Thunderbirds
Defense	Stewart Malgunas	Seattle Thunderbirds	Steve Jaques	Tri-City Americans
Center	Len Barrie	Kamloops Blazers	Glen Goodall	Seattle Thunderbirds
Left Wing	Phil Huber	Kamloops Blazers	Brian Sakic	Tri-City Americans
Right Wing	Mike Needham	Kamloops Blazers	Scott Levins	Tri-City Americans

== Trivia ==
During the 1989–90 WHL season, the Victoria Cougars set several records for futility within a 72-game WHL season. They recorded only 6 wins and 12 points. They also broke the record for most losses in a row at 37 (November 22, 1989 – February 11, 1990).

== See also ==
- 1990 Memorial Cup
- 1990 NHL entry draft
- 1989 in sports
- 1990 in sports

Preceded by 1988–89 WHL season	WHL seasons	Succeeded by 1990–91 WHL season
