= 1988–89 WHL season =

Junior ice hockey season

- League: Western Hockey League
- Sport: Ice hockey
- Teams: 14

Regular season
- Scotty Munro Memorial Trophy: Swift Current Broncos (1)
- Season MVP: Stu Barnes (Tri-City Americans)
- Top scorer: Dennis Holland (Portland Winter Hawks)

Playoffs
- Finals champions: Swift Current Broncos (1)
- Runners-up: Portland Winter Hawks

WHL seasons
- 1987–88 1989–90

1988–89 CHL season
- League: Canadian Hockey League
- Sport: Ice hockey
- Teams: 40

OHL

QMJHL

WHL

Memorial Cup
- Finals champions: Swift Current Broncos (WHL) (1st title)
- Runners-up: Saskatoon Blades (WHL)

The 1988–89 WHL season was the 23rd season of the Western Hockey League (WHL), featuring fourteen teams and a 72-game regular season. Less than three years after the 1986 team bus crash that killed four players, the Swift Current Broncos put together the best season in the club's history. The Broncos won their first Scotty Munro Memorial Trophy for the best regular season record, and in the playoffs defeated the Portland Winter Hawks to win their first President's Cup as league champions—the Broncos went undefeated throughout the playoffs. This earned the Broncos a berth in the 1989 Memorial Cup tournament, which was hosted in Saskatoon. At the tournament, the Broncos defeated the host Saskatoon Blades to win the Memorial Cup title.

This was the first season for the Tri-City Americans after the New Westminster Bruins relocated to Kennewick, Washington prior to the season. The Americans became the fourth WHL club based in the United States.

== Team changes ==
- The New Westminster Bruins relocate to Kennewick, Washington, becoming the Tri-City Americans.

== Regular season ==
=== Final standings ===
East Division
Pos	Team	Pld	W	L	T	GF	GA	Pts
1	x – Swift Current Broncos	72	55	16	1	447	319	111
2	x – Saskatoon Blades	72	42	28	2	366	335	86
3	x – Medicine Hat Tigers	72	41	27	4	359	326	86
4	x – Prince Albert Raiders	72	37	33	2	302	286	76
5	x – Lethbridge Hurricanes	72	27	39	6	356	380	60
6	x – Moose Jaw Warriors	72	27	42	3	318	372	57
7	Brandon Wheat Kings	72	25	43	4	286	331	54
8	Regina Pats	72	23	43	6	306	358	52

x – qualified for playoffs

West Division
Pos	Team	Pld	W	L	T	GF	GA	Pts
1	x – Portland Winter Hawks	72	40	28	4	408	395	84
2	x – Victoria Cougars	72	36	32	4	341	351	76
3	x – Kamloops Blazers	72	34	33	5	326	309	73
4	x – Tri-City Americans	72	33	34	5	300	299	71
5	Seattle Thunderbirds	72	33	35	4	315	276	70
6	Spokane Chiefs	72	25	45	2	326	419	52

x – qualified for playoffs

=== Scoring leaders ===
Note: GP = Games played; G = Goals; A = Assists; Pts = Points; PIM = Penalties in minutes

Player	Team	GP	G	A	Pts	PIM
Dennis Holland	Portland Winter Hawks	69	82	85	167	120
Stu Barnes	Tri-City Americans	70	59	82	141	117
Tim Tisdale	Swift Current Broncos	68	51	82	139	89
Blair Atecheynum	Moose Jaw Warriors	71	70	68	138	70
Troy Mick	Portland Winter Hawks	66	49	87	136	70
Wayne Hynes	Medicine Hat Tigers	72	54	81	135	66
Peter Kasowski	Swift Current Broncos	72	58	73	131	46
Mike Sillinger	Regina Pats	72	53	78	131	52
Sean Lebrun	Tri-City Americans	71	52	73	125	92
Kirby Lindal	Medicine Hat Tigers	71	67	55	122	83

== 1989 WHL Playoffs ==
=== First round ===
- Swift Current earned a bye
- Saskatoon earned a bye
- Lethbridge defeated Prince Albert 3 games to 1
- Moose Jaw defeated Medicine Hat 3 games to 0

=== Division semi-finals ===
- Swift Current defeated Moose Jaw 4 games to 0
- Saskatoon defeated Lethbridge 4 games to 0
- Portland defeated Tri-City 5 games to 2
- Kamloops defeated Victoria 5 games to 3

=== Division finals ===
- Swift Current defeated Saskatoon 4 games to 0
- Portland defeated Kamloops 5 games to 3

=== WHL Championship ===
- Swift Current defeated Portland 4 games to 0

== All-Star game ==
On January 24, the West Division defeated the East Division 5–1 at Brandon, Manitoba before a crowd of 2,933.

== WHL awards ==
Most Valuable Player - Four Broncos Memorial Trophy: Stu Barnes, Tri-City Americans
Scholastic Player of the Year - Daryl K. (Doc) Seaman Trophy: Jeff Nelson, Prince Albert Raiders
Top Scorer - Bob Clarke Trophy: Dennis Holland, Portland Winter Hawks
Most Sportsmanlike Player - Brad Hornung Trophy: Blair Atcheynum, Moose Jaw Warriors
Top Defenseman - Bill Hunter Trophy: Dan Lambert, Swift Current Broncos
Rookie of the Year - Jim Piggott Memorial Trophy: Wes Walz, Lethbridge Hurricanes
Top Goaltender - Del Wilson Trophy: Danny Lorenz, Seattle Thunderbirds
Coach of the Year - Dunc McCallum Memorial Trophy: Ron Kennedy, Medicine Hat Tigers
Executive of the Year - Lloyd Saunders Memorial Trophy: Dennis Beyak, Saskatoon Blades
Regular season champions - Scotty Munro Memorial Trophy: Swift Current Broncos
WHL Plus-Minus Award: Darren Stolk, Medicine Hat Tigers

== All-Star teams ==
East Division
	First Team		Second Team	
Goal	Frederic Chabot	Prince Albert Raiders	Smokey Reddick	Moose Jaw Warriors
Defense	Dan Lambert	Swift Current Broncos	Gord Kruppke (tied)	Prince Albert Raiders
Defense	Collin Bauer	Saskatoon Blades	Todd Nelson (tied)	Prince Albert Raiders
Defense	-	-	Bob Woods (tied)	Brandon Wheat Kings
Center	Mike Modano	Prince Albert Raiders	Tim Tisdale	Swift Current Broncos
Left Wing	Kirby Lindal	Medicine Hat Tigers	Gary Dickie	Regina Pats
Right Wing	Blair Atcheynum	Moose Jaw Warriors	Sheldon Kennedy	Swift Current Broncos
West Division
	First Team		Second Team	
Goal	Danny Lorenz	Seattle Thunderbirds	Olaf Kolzig	Tri-City Americans
Defense	Steve Jaques	Tri-City Americans	Pat MacLeod	Kamloops Blazers
Defense	Chad Biafore	Portland Winter Hawks	Geoff Smith	Kamloops Blazers
Center	Dennis Holland	Portland Winter Hawks	Stu Barnes	Tri-City Americans
Left Wing	Dave Chyzowski	Kamloops Blazers	Troy Mick	Portland Winter Hawks
Right Wing	Jackson Penney	Victoria Cougars	Pat Falloon	Spokane Chiefs

== See also ==
- 1989 NHL entry draft
- 1988 in sports
- 1989 in sports

Preceded by 1987–88 WHL season	WHL seasons	Succeeded by 1989–90 WHL season
