= Dan Lambert =

Canadian ice hockey player and coach

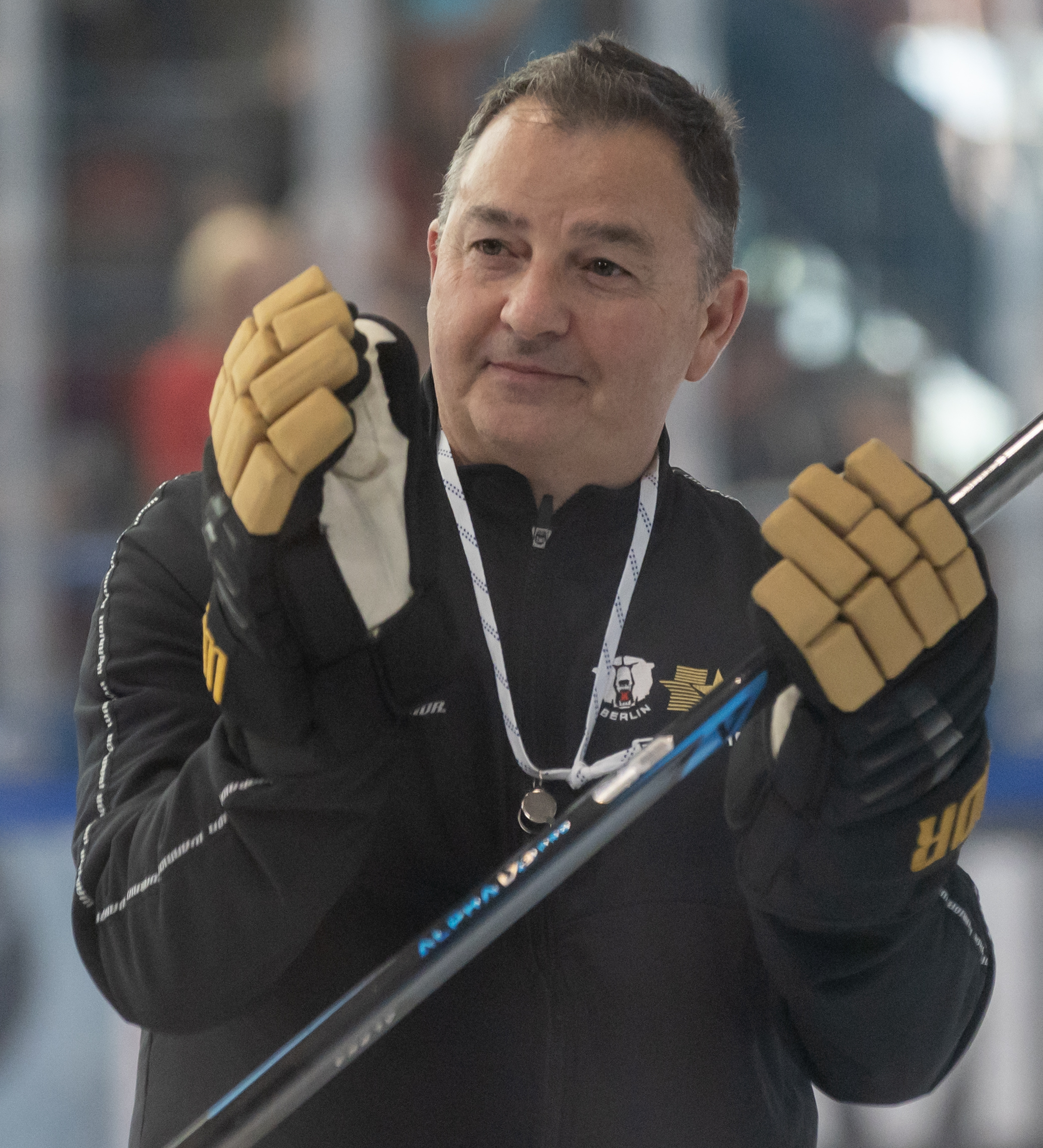
- Lambert in 2026
- Born: January 12, 1970 (age 56) Saint Boniface, Manitoba, Canada
- Height: 5 ft 8 in (173 cm)
- Weight: 177 lb (80 kg; 12 st 9 lb)
- Position: Defence
- Shot: Left
- Played for: Quebec Nordiques; HIFK; Kölner Haie; Krefeld Pinguine; Hamburg Freezers; Hannover Scorpions
- National team: Canada
- NHL draft: 106th overall, 1989; Quebec Nordiques
- Playing career: 1990–2009

Daniel Lambert (born January 12, 1970) is a Canadian former professional ice hockey player who played 29 games in the National Hockey League (NHL) for the Quebec Nordiques during the 1990–91 and 1991–92 seasons. The rest of his career, which lasted from 1990 to 2009, was mainly spent in the minor leagues and then the Deutsche Eishockey Liga. He has been an assistant coach of the Nashville Predators of the NHL since 2019.

== Early career ==
Lambert grew up in the community of St. Malo, in southeastern Manitoba, and played his minor hockey in St. Malo, Steinbach, and Ste. Anne. He played one season of high school hockey in Warroad, Minnesota, before joining the Swift Current Broncos of the Western Hockey League as a 16-year-old in 1986.

Midway into his first season with the Broncos, the team bus was involved in a fatal crash that claimed the lives of four Broncos players; Lambert was not on the bus. Two seasons later, he scored 102 points in 57 regular season games. The Broncos went on to win the Memorial Cup that season; Lambert was named the Most Valuable Player of the tournament. His 244 career assists stands as a franchise record.

== Professional career ==
Lambert was drafted 106th overall by the Quebec Nordiques in the 1989 NHL entry draft. From 1990 to 1992, Lambert split his time between the Fort Wayne Komets of the International Hockey League, Halifax Citadels of the American Hockey League, and Nordiques. He played a total of 29 games for the Nordiques, scoring 15 points. In June 1992, Lambert was traded to the Winnipeg Jets and spent the entire 1992-93 season with the Moncton Hawks, their AHL affiliate. Lambert did not play a game in the NHL that season and decided to leave to play in Finland after the season ended. He played 13 games there with HIFK before returning to North American to play for the Komets in 1993-94.

In 1994, Lambert joined the San Diego Gulls of the IHL. The team played one season in San Diego before moving to Los Angeles for one season, and finally settled in Long Beach, California to become the Long Beach Ice Dogs. During his five seasons with the franchise, Lambert was one of the IHL's premier defenceman, scoring 308 points in 353 games. He was named an all-star four times and received the Governor's Trophy as the league's top defenceman in 1998. He also led all defencemen in scoring twice.

Lambert signed a contract with the Kölner Haie of the Deutsche Eishockey Liga in 1999, helping the team win the Spengler Cup that season. After one season in Cologne, he played three with the Krefeld Pinguine, one with the Hamburg Freezers, and five with the Hannover Scorpions. Lambert helped lead Krefeld to a DEL championship in 2003.

Lambert retired from professional hockey in 2009.

== International competition ==
Lambert had the opportunity to play for Canada on a number of occasions in international competition, most notably at the 1989 World Junior Championships in Anchorage, Alaska. In 2005, Lambert was named as Team Canada's captain for the Deutschland Cup.

== Coaching career ==
After retiring as a player in 2009, Lambert joined the Kelowna Rockets organization, first as an assistant coach and then as the head coach. As head coach, he led the Rockets to a runner-up finish at the 2015 Memorial Cup. He also served as one of Canada's three head coaches for the 2014 World Under-17 Hockey Challenge.

Lambert was hired as an assistant coach by the Buffalo Sabres in July 2015. On May 16, 2016, in a reorganization within the Sabres coaching staff, Lambert was assigned head coaching duties of the Rochester Americans. Lambert was fired as Amerks head coach at the end of the 2016-17 season but was then hired to coach the Spokane Chiefs of the Western Hockey League.

After two seasons as head coach of the Spokane Chiefs, Lambert left the organization in June 2019 to become an assistant coach with the Nashville Predators.

As of 30 May 2023, Lambert is no longer the assistant coach of the Nashville Predators, after serving as the assistant coach from 2019-2023. Consulting on the team's forward group and working with its power-play units, Nashville went 19.5 percent on the man-advantage during Lambert's tenure, including a 24.4 percent mark in 2021-22, the highest in team history.

== Personal ==
Lambert and his wife, Melanie, have three daughters.

== Career statistics ==
=== Regular season and playoffs ===
			Regular season					Playoffs
Season	Team	League	GP	G	A	Pts	PIM	GP	G	A	Pts	PIM
1985–86	Warroad High School	HS-MN	21	14	22	36	10	—	—	—	—	—
1986–87	Swift Current Broncos	WHL	68	13	53	66	95	4	1	1	2	9
1987–88	Swift Current Broncos	WHL	69	20	63	83	120	10	2	10	12	45
1988–89	Swift Current Broncos	WHL	57	25	77	102	158	12	9	19	28	12
1988–89	Swift Current Broncos	M-Cup	—	—	—	—	—	5	2	6	8	12
1989–90	Swift Current Broncos	WHL	50	17	51	68	119	4	2	3	5	12
1990–91	Quebec Nordiques	NHL	1	0	0	0	0	—	—	—	—	—
1990–91	Halifax Citadels	AHL	30	7	13	20	20	—	—	—	—	—
1990–91	Fort Wayne Komets	IHL	49	10	27	37	65	19	4	10	14	20
1991–92	Quebec Nordiques	NHL	28	6	9	15	22	—	—	—	—	—
1991–92	Halifax Citadels	AHL	47	3	28	31	33	—	—	—	—	—
1992–93	Moncton Hawks	AHL	73	11	30	41	100	5	1	2	3	2
1993–94	HIFK	FIN	13	1	2	3	8	—	—	—	—	—
1993–94	Fort Wayne Komets	IHL	62	10	27	37	138	18	3	12	15	20
1994–95	San Diego Gulls	IHL	70	6	19	25	95	5	0	5	5	10
1995–96	Los Angeles Ice Dogs	IHL	81	22	65	87	121	—	—	—	—	—
1996–97	Los Angeles Ice Dogs	IHL	71	15	50	65	70	18	2	8	10	8
1997–98	Los Angeles Ice Dogs	IHL	81	19	59	78	112	17	3	14	17	16
1998–99	Los Angeles Ice Dogs	IHL	50	17	36	53	91	8	0	6	6	12
1999–00	Kölner Haie	DEL	50	9	16	25	52	10	1	3	4	10
2000–01	Krefeld Pinguine	DEL	48	8	18	26	60	—	—	—	—	—
2001–02	Krefeld Pinguine	DEL	56	11	32	43	58	1	1	0	1	0
2002–03	Krefeld Pinguine	DEL	51	9	30	39	68	14	1	6	7	26
2003–04	Hamburg Freezers	DEL	47	10	22	32	42	11	0	6	6	4
2004–05	Hannover Scorpions	DEL	50	7	24	31	68	—	—	—	—	—
2005–06	Hannover Scorpions	DEL	49	9	14	23	114	10	0	1	1	20
2006–07	Hannover Scorpions	DEL	47	3	29	32	100	6	0	4	4	8
2007–08	Hannover Scorpions	DEL	49	10	22	32	73	3	0	0	0	2
2008–09	Hannover Scorpions	DEL	41	4	12	16	32	11	0	4	4	8
DEL totals			488	80	219	299	667	66	3	24	27	78
NHL totals			29	6	9	15	22	—	—	—	—	—

=== International ===
Year	Team	Event	GP	G	A	Pts	PIM
1989	Canada	WJC	7	1	2	3	4
Junior totals			7	1	2	3	4

== Awards ==
- WHL East First All-Star Team – 1989 & 1990
