= Aleksi Heponiemi =

Finnish ice hockey player (born 1999)

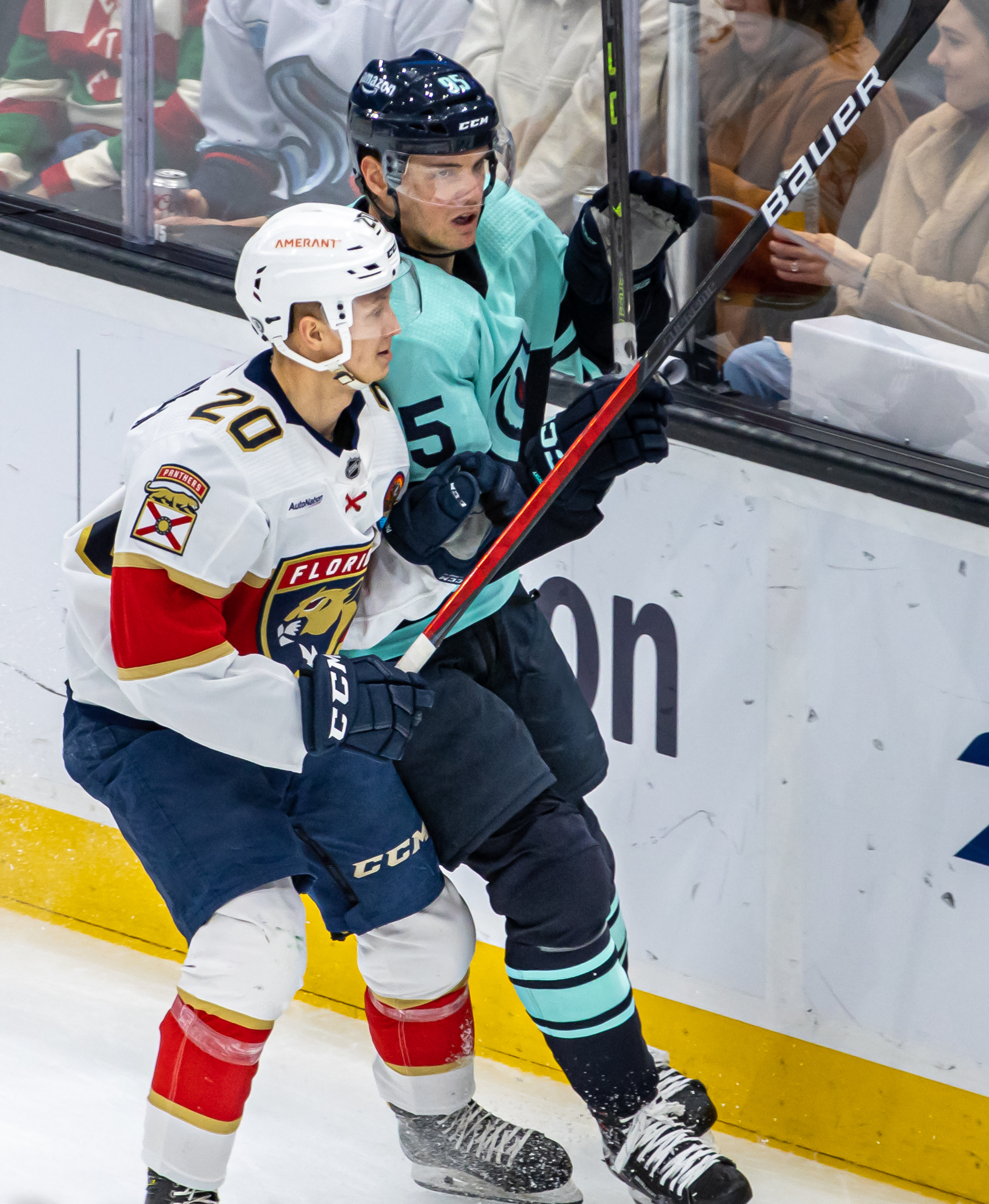
- Heponiemi (left) with the Florida Panthers in 2022
- Born: 9 January 1999 (age 27) Tampere, Finland
- Height: 5 ft 10 in (178 cm)
- Weight: 155 lb (70 kg; 11 st 1 lb)
- Position: Centre
- Shoots: Left
- SHL team Former teams: HV71; Oulun Kärpät; Florida Panthers; EHC Biel
- NHL draft: 40th overall, 2017; Florida Panthers
- Playing career: 2018–present

Aleksi Heponiemi (born 9 January 1999) is a Finnish professional ice hockey forward currently playing for HV71 in the Swedish Hockey League (SHL), with his National Hockey League (NHL) rights held by Florida Panthers. Heponiemi was selected in the second round (40th overall) in the 2017 NHL entry draft by the Panthers.

== Playing career ==
After being selected 10th overall by the Swift Current Broncos in the 2016 CHL Import Draft, Heponiemi began his junior career for the Broncos in the 2016–17 WHL season. Early in the season, Heponiemi began to rise in draft rankings and became an offensive leader for the Broncos. He adjusted quickly to the playing style of the WHL and was named WHL Rookie of the Year, producing the most points and assists out of any rookie in the season with 86.

Despite his statistics, Heponiemi's final scout ranking for the 2017 NHL entry draft was 26 by the NHL Central Scouting. Scouts mainly praised Heponiemi for his efficient point producing, his creativeness, and his speed. Heponiemi was selected in the second round, 40th overall in the 2017 NHL Entry Draft by the Florida Panthers. Due to his point-producing skill in his rookie season in the WHL, some think Heponiemi was a steal because of how late he was selected in the second round by the Panthers.

Heponiemi had a career year during the 2017–18 season, where he accumulated 118 points in 57 regular season games. For his efforts, at the conclusion of the regular season he was named the Pattison Agriculture King of the Road, the Second Star of the season, and the Eastern Conference Most Sportsmanlike Player.

Following the conclusion of the season, Heponiemi turned professional and signed with Oulun Kärpät of the Liiga. In the 2018–19 season, Heponiemi as a rookie appeared in 50 games for Kärpät producing 16 goals and 46 points. He led all Liiga rookies in points, while finishing second on Kärpät in points and tying for first on the club in assists. In the playoffs, Heponiemi tallied three goals in 17 games.

On 16 May 2019, Heponiemi was signed to a three-year, entry-level contract with the Florida Panthers.

With the 2020–21 North American season delayed until November due to the COVID-19 pandemic, Heponiemi was loaned by the Panthers to Swedish second-tier club, Modo Hockey of the Allsvenskan, on 9 August 2020. Heponiemi made his NHL debut on 30 January 2021, scoring an overtime goal in the Panthers' 3–2 win over the Detroit Red Wings. He became the fourth player in NHL history to score an overtime goal in his NHL debut.

Following his fourth season with the Florida Panthers, Heponiemi was unable to earn a full-time role with the Panthers and opted to return to Europe. Heponiemi subsequently secured a one-year contract with Swiss club EHC Biel-Bienne of the NL on 21 July 2023.

After two seasons with Biel, Heponiemi left Switzerland and signed a two-year contract with Swedish club, HV71 of the SHL, on 30 May 2025.

== International play ==
Medal record

Representing Finland

Ice hockey

World Junior Championships
| Gold medal – first place | 2019 Canada | |

Heponiemi played in the 2016 Ivan Hlinka Memorial Tournament, a tournament not regulated by the International Ice Hockey Federation but still considered an important tournament for under-18 players. He played 4 games for Finland in the tournament, recording 5 assists as Finland finished in 3rd place. Heponiemi also participated and was named to Team Finland in the 2018 World Junior Ice Hockey Championships where Finland finished 6th and Heponiemi scored 2 goals in 5 games with the team.

== Personal life ==
Heponiemi began playing hockey when he was four years old, and has two older brothers, Valtteri and Ville. Aleksi and his brother Ville both played for the Ilves youth junior team and in the 2015–16 season both brothers won the championship together. His brother, Valtteri current plays for the Pirkkala Penguins, a third division team in Pirkkala, Finland along with Ville who also plays for the Penguins, along with Valtteri.

== Career statistics ==
=== Regular season and playoffs ===
| | | | Regular season | | | | | Playoffs |
| Season | Team | League | GP | G | A | Pts | PIM | GP | G | A | Pts | PIM |
|---|---|---|---|---|---|---|---|---|---|---|---|---|
| 2015–16 | Ilves | Jr. A | 7 | 2 | 2 | 4 | 2 | 7 | 1 | 0 | 1 | 2 |
| 2016–17 | Swift Current Broncos | WHL | 72 | 28 | 58 | 86 | 18 | 14 | 0 | 8 | 8 | 8 |
| 2017–18 | Swift Current Broncos | WHL | 57 | 28 | 90 | 118 | 28 | 26 | 5 | 25 | 30 | 2 |
| 2018–19 | Oulun Kärpät | Liiga | 50 | 16 | 30 | 46 | 8 | 17 | 3 | 0 | 3 | 8 |
| 2019–20 | Springfield Thunderbirds | AHL | 49 | 3 | 11 | 14 | 16 | — | — | — | — | — |
| 2020–21 | Modo Hockey | Allsv | 16 | 6 | 8 | 14 | 22 | — | — | — | — | — |
| 2020–21 | Florida Panthers | NHL | 9 | 1 | 1 | 2 | 2 | — | — | — | — | — |
| 2020–21 | Syracuse Crunch | AHL | 6 | 0 | 6 | 6 | 6 | — | — | — | — | — |
| 2021–22 | Charlotte Checkers | AHL | 56 | 9 | 30 | 39 | 28 | 7 | 1 | 3 | 4 | 14 |
| 2021–22 | Florida Panthers | NHL | 6 | 0 | 1 | 1 | 2 | — | — | — | — | — |
| 2022–23 | Charlotte Checkers | AHL | 62 | 12 | 31 | 43 | 12 | 7 | 1 | 6 | 7 | 0 |
| 2022–23 | Florida Panthers | NHL | 10 | 1 | 2 | 3 | 2 | — | — | — | — | — |
| 2023–24 | EHC Biel | NL | 22 | 7 | 10 | 17 | 10 | 8 | 1 | 1 | 2 | 0 |
| 2024–25 | EHC Biel | NL | 37 | 6 | 12 | 18 | 8 | — | — | — | — | — |
| Liiga totals | | | 50 | 16 | 30 | 46 | 8 | 17 | 3 | 0 | 3 | 8 |
| NHL totals | | | 25 | 2 | 4 | 6 | 6 | — | — | — | — | — |

=== International ===
| Year | Team | Event | Result | GP | G | A | Pts | PIM |
|---|---|---|---|---|---|---|---|---|
| 2015 | Finland | U17 | 5th | 5 | 0 | 0 | 0 | 0 |
| 2016 | Finland | IH18 | 6th | 4 | 0 | 5 | 5 | 0 |
| 2018 | Finland | WJC | 6th | 5 | 2 | 0 | 2 | 0 |
| 2019 | Finland | WJC | 1st place, gold medalist(s) | 7 | 3 | 6 | 9 | 4 |
| Junior totals | | | | 21 | 5 | 11 | 16 | 4 |

== Awards and honours ==
| Award | Year |
WHL
| Jim Piggott Trophy | 2017 |
| First All-Star Team | 2018 |
| Brad Hornung Trophy | 2018 |
| CHL Sportsman of the Year | 2018 |
