= Scott Albert =

Scott Albert may refer to:

- Scott Albert (musician) (born 1969), electronic rock musician known as Klayton
- Scott Albert (ice hockey), participated in 1989 Memorial Cup
