= 1989 Memorial Cup =

Canadian junior men's ice hockey championship

Tournament details
- Venue(s): Saskatchewan Place; Saskatoon, Saskatchewan
- Dates: May 6–13, 1989
- Teams: 4
- Host team: Saskatoon Blades (WHL)
- TV partner: CTV (Final game only)

Final positions
- Champions: Swift Current Broncos (WHL) (1st title)

Tournament statistics
- Games played: 8

The Memorial Cup trophy

The 1989 Memorial Cup occurred May 6–13 at the brand new Saskatchewan Place in Saskatoon, Saskatchewan. It was the 71st annual Memorial Cup competition and determined the major junior ice hockey champion of the Canadian Hockey League (CHL). Participating teams were the Western Hockey League champion Swift Current Broncos, the WHL hosts, the Saskatoon Blades, as well as the winners of the Quebec Major Junior Hockey League and Ontario Hockey League which were the Laval Titan and Peterborough Petes. In the first ever all-WHL final (in fact, an all-Saskatchewan final), an overflow, bi-partisan crowd of more than 11,000 saw Swift Current beat Saskatoon in overtime to win their first Memorial Cup.

== Teams ==
QMJHL Team OHL Team WHL Team Host Team

=== Laval Titan ===
The Laval Titan represented the Quebec Major Junior Hockey League at the 1989 Memorial Cup. The Titan finished the 1988-89 season with a 43-26-1 record, earning 87 points, and second place in the league standings. The Titan offense was the second most potent in the league, scoring 361 goals. Defensively, Laval ranked third, as they allowed 292 goals. In the post-season, Laval swept the Granby Bisons in four games in the QMJHL quarter-finals. In the league semi-finals, the Titan defeated the Shawinigan Cataractes four games to two, advancing to the President's Cup. In the final round of the post-season, Laval defeated the Victoriaville Tigres in a memorable seven game series, winning the league championship and earning a berth into the 1989 Memorial Cup.

Laval's offense was led by Donald Audette, who scored a team high 76 goals and 161 points in 70 games, finishing third in the QMJHL scoring race. Audette led the Titan in post-season scoring, as he had 17 goals and 29 points in 17 games, winning the Guy Lafleur Trophy as QMJHL Playoff MVP. Denis Chalifoux scored 46 goals and 137 points in 70 games, while Claude Lapointe scored 32 goals and 104 points in 63 games, giving the Titan three 100+ point players. The Titan defense was led by top prospect Patrice Brisebois, who scored 20 goals and 65 points in 50 games. Following the season, Brisebois was drafted by the Montreal Canadiens in the second round of the 1989 NHL entry draft. In goal, the Titan were led by Ghislain Lefebvre, who earned a 31-19-1 record with a 3.90 GAA and a .869 save percentage in 53 games.

The 1989 Memorial Cup was the second time in franchise history that the Titan qualified for the tournament. In their first appearance at the 1984 Memorial Cup, Laval finished in fourth place.

=== Peterborough Petes ===
The Peterborough Petes represented the Ontario Hockey League at the 1989 Memorial Cup. The Petes finished the 1988-89 season with the top record in the Leyden Division, as they were 42-22-2, earning 86 points. The Petes offense ranked seventh in the fifteen team league, as they scored 302 goals. Peterborough was the top defensive team in the OHL, allowing only 235 goals. In the Leyden Division quarter-finals, the Petes defeated the Belleville Bulls four games to one. The club earned a bye in the division semi-finals, advancing straight to the division finals. Peterborough met the Cornwall Royals in the Leyden Division finals, as they defeated the Royals four games to two, earning a spot in the J. Ross Robertson Cup finals. In the final round of the post-season, the Petes defeated the Niagara Falls Thunder four games to two, winning the OHL championship and earning a berth into the 1989 Memorial Cup.

The Petes offense was led by Mike Ricci, who scored 54 goals and 106 points in 60 games. In the post-season, Ricci led Peterborough with 19 goals and 35 points in 17 games. He became a top prospect for the 1990 NHL entry draft during this season. Ross Wilson finished second in team scoring, as he scored 48 goals and 89 points in 64 games. Jamey Hicks was just over a point-per-game in the regular season, as he scored 18 goals and 57 points in 56 games. In the post-season, Hicks scored eight goals and 28 points in 17 games. New Jersey Devils prospect Corey Foster began the season in the National Hockey League before returning to Peterborough. In 55 games with the Petes, Foster scored 14 goals and 56 points to lead the Petes defense. Peterborough's goaltending duties were split between John Tanner and Todd Bojcun. Tanner earned a record of 22-10-0 with a 3.34 GAA in 34 games, while Bojcun was 20-12-2 with a 3.59 GAA in 35 games. They were awarded the Dave Pinkney Trophy, awarded to the Goaltenders of the OHL Team with the Fewest Goals Against.

The 1989 Memorial Cup was the sixth time in team history that the Petes participated in the event. Peterborough won the 1979 Memorial Cup when they defeated the Brandon Wheat Kings in the final game. The club was a finalist at the 1980 Memorial Cup, the 1978 Memorial Cup, the 1972 Memorial Cup, and the 1959 Memorial Cup.

=== Saskatoon Blades ===
The Saskatoon Blades represented the Western Hockey League as the host team at the 1989 Memorial Cup. The Blades finished in second place in the East Division during the 1988-89 season with a 42-28-2 record, earning 86 points. Saskatoon scored 366 goals during the regular season, which ranked them third in the WHL. The Blades allowed 335 goals, which ranked them seventh in the fourteen team league. Saskatoon earned a bye in the first round of the playoffs, as the club immediately advanced to the East Division semi-finals against the Lethbridge Hurricanes. The Blades swept the Hurricanes in four games, moving to the division finals where they met the top ranked Swift Current Broncos. The Broncos swept Saskatoon in four games, ending their season, however, the club qualified for the 1989 Memorial Cup as the host team of the event.

Detroit Red Wings top prospect Kory Kocur led the Blades in scoring, as he 45 goals and 102 points in 67 games. In the post-season, Kocur scored a team high seven goals and 18 points in eight games. Rookie Scott Scissons emerged as a top prospect for the 1990 NHL entry draft, as in 71 games, he scored 30 goals and 86 points to finish second in team scoring. Tracey Katelnikoff scored 41 goals and 79 points in 62 games, which was the third consecutive season that he had cracked the 40 goal plateau. Collin Bauer led the Blades defense corps in scoring, as he scored 17 goals and 79 points in 61 games. Ken Sutton scored 22 goals and 53 points in 71 games from the blue line. In goal, Dean Kuntz saw the majority of action, as he posted a 22-10-1 record with a 4.01 GAA in 38 games.

The 1989 Memorial Cup was the first time in team history that the Blades qualified for the event. A previous Saskatoon based team, the Saskatoon Wesleys, lost in the finals to the West Toronto Nationals at the 1936 Memorial Cup.

=== Swift Current Broncos ===
The Swift Current Broncos represented the Western Hockey League at the 1989 Memorial Cup. The Broncos finished with the best record in the WHL during the 1988-89 season, earning a 55-16-1 record, recording 111 points. The club won the Scotty Munro Memorial Trophy for their achievement. Swift Current was the highest scoring team in the WHL with 447 goals. Defensively, the Broncos ranked fifth, as they allowed 319 goals. The team earned a first round bye in the post-season, as they immediately advanced to the East Division semi-finals. In their match-up against the Moose Jaw Warriors, Swift Current swept the series, winning in four games. The Broncos remained hot in the division finals, as they swept the Saskatoon Blades in four games, advancing to the President's Cup finals. In the final round, Swift Current completed a perfect playoff run, as they swept the Portland Winter Hawks in four games to finish the post-season with a 12-0 record, and earn a berth into the 1989 Memorial Cup.

The high-powered Broncos offense was led by Tim Tisdale, as he scored 57 goals and a team-high 139 points in 68 games, placing him third in the WHL scoring race. Tisdale led Swift Current in post-season scoring, as he scored 17 goals and 32 points in 12 games. Peter Kasowski scored 58 goals and 131 points, as he placed in seventh place in WHL scoring. Sheldon Kennedy also scored 58 goals for the Broncos, as he added 48 assists for 106 points in 51 games played. Defenseman Dan Lambert scored 25 goals and 102 points in 57 games, as he was awarded the Bill Hunter Memorial Trophy, awarded to the WHL Defenseman of the Year. Brian Sakic scored 36 goals and 100 points in 70 games, as the Broncos had five players record 100+ points during the season. In goal, Trevor Kruger was the Broncos starting goaltender, as he earned a 47-8-0 record with a 4.01 GAA and a .865 save percentage in 59 games.

The 1989 Memorial Cup was the first time that the Broncos had appeared in the tournament since the team relocated back to Swift Current in 1986. The Lethbridge Broncos participated at the 1983 Memorial Cup, as they club finished in fourth place at the tournament.

== Round-robin standings ==
| Pos | Team | Pld | W | L | GF | GA | |
|---|---|---|---|---|---|---|---|
| 1 | Saskatoon Blades (WHL Host) | 3 | 2 | 1 | 12 | 10 | Advanced directly to the championship game |
| 2 | Swift Current Broncos (WHL) | 3 | 2 | 1 | 16 | 14 | Advanced to the semifinal game |
| 3 | Peterborough Petes (OHL) | 3 | 1 | 2 | 8 | 11 | Advanced to the semifinal game |
| 4 | Laval Titan (QMJHL) | 3 | 1 | 2 | 11 | 12 | Advanced to the tiebreaker |

== Scores ==
Round-robin

- May 6 Swift Current 6-4 Peterborough
- May 6 Saskatoon 5-3 Laval
- May 7 Peterborough 3-2 Saskatoon
- May 7 Swift Current 6-5 Laval
- May 9 Laval 3-1 Peterborough
- May 10 Saskatoon 5-4 Swift Current

Tie-breaker

- May 11 Peterborough 5-4 Laval

Semi-final

- May 12 Swift Current 6-2 Peterborough

Final

- May 13 Swift Current 4-3 Saskatoon (OT)

=== Winning roster ===
1988-89 Swift Current Broncos
| Goaltenders: – Don Blishen; – Trevor Kruger | Defencemen: – Kevin Barrett; – Jeff Knight; – Kevin Knopp; – Darren Kruger; – Dan Lambert - C; – Evan Marble; – Bob Wilkie | Wingers: – Scott Albert; – Sheldon Kennedy - C; – Chris Larkin; – Trent McCleary; – Mark McFarlane; – Geoff Sanderson; – Trevor Sim; – Wade Smith; – Peter Soberlak | Centres: – Kimbi Daniels; – Peter Kasowski; – Blake Knox; – Kyle Reeves; – Matt Ripley; – Brian Sakic; – Tim Tisdale; Coach: Graham James; General Manager: Graham James |

== Award winners ==
- Stafford Smythe Memorial Trophy (MVP): Dan Lambert, Swift Current
- George Parsons Trophy (Sportsmanship): Jamey Hicks, Peterborough
- Hap Emms Memorial Trophy (Goaltender): Mike Greenlay, Saskatoon

All-star team

- Goal: Mike Greenlay, Saskatoon
- Defence: Dan Lambert, Swift Current; Ken Sutton, Saskatoon
- Centre: Tim Tisdale, Swift Current
- Left wing: Neil Carnes, Laval
- Right wing: Sheldon Kennedy, Swift Current
