= Bob Wilkie (ice hockey) =

Canadian ice hockey player (born 1969)

- Born: February 11, 1969 (age 56); Calgary, Alberta, Canada
- Height: 6 ft 2 in (188 cm)
- Weight: 215 lb (98 kg; 15 st 5 lb)
- Position: Defence
- Shot: Right
- Played for: Augsburg Panthers; Detroit Red Wings; Philadelphia Flyers
- NHL draft: 41st overall, 1987; Detroit Red Wings
- Playing career: 1989–2000

Bob Wilkie (born February 11, 1969) is a Canadian former professional ice hockey defenceman who played 18 games in the National Hockey League games with the Detroit Red Wings and Philadelphia Flyers between 1990 and 1994. The rest of his career, which lasted from 1989 to 2000, was spent in the minor leagues.

== Career statistics ==
=== Regular season and playoffs ===
| | | | Regular season | | | | | Playoffs |
| Season | Team | League | GP | G | A | Pts | PIM | GP | G | A | Pts | PIM |
|---|---|---|---|---|---|---|---|---|---|---|---|---|
| 1984–85 | Calgary Buffaloes U18 | AMHL | 37 | 20 | 33 | 53 | 116 | — | — | — | — | — |
| 1985–86 | Calgary Wranglers | WHL | 63 | 8 | 19 | 27 | 56 | — | — | — | — | — |
| 1986–87 | Calgary Wranglers | WHL | 1 | 0 | 1 | 1 | 0 | — | — | — | — | — |
| 1986–87 | Swift Current Broncos | WHL | 64 | 12 | 37 | 49 | 50 | 4 | 1 | 3 | 4 | 2 |
| 1987–88 | Swift Current Broncos | WHL | 67 | 12 | 68 | 80 | 124 | 10 | 4 | 12 | 16 | 8 |
| 1988–89 | Swift Current Broncos | WHL | 62 | 18 | 67 | 85 | 89 | 12 | 1 | 11 | 12 | 47 |
| 1988–89 | Swift Current Broncos | M-Cup | — | — | — | — | — | 5 | 2 | 3 | 5 | 10 |
| 1989–90 | Adirondack Red Wings | AHL | 58 | 5 | 33 | 38 | 64 | 6 | 1 | 4 | 5 | 2 |
| 1990–91 | Detroit Red Wings | NHL | 8 | 1 | 2 | 3 | 2 | — | — | — | — | — |
| 1990–91 | Adirondack Red Wings | AHL | 43 | 6 | 18 | 24 | 71 | 2 | 1 | 0 | 1 | 2 |
| 1991–92 | Adirondack Red Wings | AHL | 7 | 1 | 4 | 5 | 6 | 16 | 2 | 5 | 7 | 12 |
| 1992–93 | Adirondack Red Wings | AHL | 14 | 0 | 5 | 5 | 20 | — | — | — | — | — |
| 1992–93 | Fort Wayne Komets | IHL | 32 | 7 | 14 | 21 | 82 | 12 | 4 | 6 | 10 | 10 |
| 1992–93 | Hershey Bears | AHL | 28 | 7 | 25 | 32 | 18 | — | — | — | — | — |
| 1993–94 | Philadelphia Flyers | NHL | 10 | 1 | 3 | 4 | 8 | — | — | — | — | — |
| 1993–94 | Hershey Bears | AHL | 69 | 8 | 53 | 61 | 100 | 9 | 1 | 4 | 5 | 8 |
| 1994–95 | Hershey Bears | AHL | 50 | 9 | 30 | 39 | 46 | — | — | — | — | — |
| 1994–95 | Indianapolis Ice | IHL | 29 | 5 | 22 | 27 | 30 | — | — | — | — | — |
| 1995–96 | Augsburg Panthers | DEL | 6 | 0 | 1 | 1 | 43 | — | — | — | — | — |
| 1995–96 | Cincinnati Cyclones | IHL | 22 | 4 | 6 | 10 | 32 | — | — | — | — | — |
| 1997–98 | Las Vegas Thunder | IHL | 3 | 0 | 1 | 1 | 0 | — | — | — | — | — |
| 1997–98 | Fresno Falcons | WCHL | 54 | 13 | 50 | 63 | 60 | 5 | 1 | 7 | 8 | 38 |
| 1998–99 | Pensacola Ice Pilots | ECHL | 16 | 2 | 11 | 13 | 18 | — | — | — | — | — |
| 1998–99 | Fresno Falcons | WCHL | 10 | 3 | 4 | 7 | 12 | 7 | 1 | 2 | 3 | 18 |
| 1999–00 | Anchorage Aces | WCHL | 15 | 3 | 10 | 13 | 18 | 4 | 1 | 4 | 5 | 16 |
| AHL totals | | | 269 | 36 | 168 | 204 | 325 | 33 | 5 | 13 | 18 | 24 |
| NHL totals | | | 18 | 2 | 5 | 7 | 10 | — | — | — | — | — |
