= Andy Schneider (ice hockey, born 1972) =

Canadian ice hockey player

- Born: March 29, 1972 (age 54) Edmonton, Alberta, Canada
- Height: 5 ft 10 in (178 cm)
- Weight: 176 lb (80 kg; 12 st 8 lb)
- Position: Left wing
- Shot: Left
- Played for: Ottawa Senators
- National team: Canada
- NHL draft: Undrafted
- Playing career: 1992–2011

Andrew Schneider (born March 29, 1972) is a Canadian former professional ice hockey winger who played in the National Hockey League (NHL).

== Career ==
Schneider signed with the expansion Ottawa Senators on October 9, 1992, and made his professional debut with the Senators' American Hockey League (AHL) affiliate, the New Haven Senators. After 19 games with New Haven, he was returned to his junior team, the Swift Current Broncos of the Western Hockey League (WHL). Schneider led the Broncos to the President's Cup championship and was named WHL Playoff MVP. He made his NHL debut with the Senators during the 1993–94 season, going scoreless in ten games played.

After the 1996–97 season, Schneider left North America and played the next fifteen seasons in Europe, primarily in the German Deutsche Eishockey Liga (DEL) and the Austrian Erste Bank Eishockey Liga (EBEL). Swedish Elite League(SHL).

He retired following the 2010–11 season and is the Director of North America Amateur Scouting for the New York Rangers.

== Awards ==
- 1992–93 WHL East Second Team All-Star
- 1992–93 WHL Playoff MVP

== Career statistics ==
			Regular season					Playoffs
Season	Team	League	GP	G	A	Pts	PIM	GP	G	A	Pts	PIM
1988–89	Seattle Thunderbirds	WHL	69	7	26	33	43	—	—	—	—	—
1989–90	Seattle Thunderbirds	WHL	28	10	12	22	55	—	—	—	—	—
1989–90	Swift Current Broncos	WHL	42	16	21	37	43	4	2	1	3	2
1990–91	Swift Current Broncos	WHL	69	12	74	86	103	3	0	0	0	2
1991–92	Swift Current Broncos	WHL	63	44	60	104	120	8	4	9	13	8
1992–93	New Haven Senators	AHL	19	2	2	4	13	—	—	—	—	—
1992–93	Swift Current Broncos	WHL	38	19	66	85	78	17	13	26	39	40
1993–94	Ottawa Senators	NHL	10	0	0	0	15	—	—	—	—	—
1993–94	Prince Edward Island Senators	AHL	61	15	46	61	119	—	—	—	—	—
1994–95	Leksands IF	SEL	39	6	8	14	62	4	1	1	2	31
1994–95	Prince Edward Island Senators	AHL	10	1	5	6	25	11	5	5	10	11
1994–95	Canadian National Team	Intl	3	1	0	1	0	—	—	—	—	—
1995–96	Minnesota Moose	IHL	81	12	28	40	85	—	—	—	—	—
1996–97	Manitoba Moose	IHL	79	14	37	51	142	—	—	—	—	—
1997–98	Revierlöwen Oberhausen	DEL	27	3	14	17	48	—	—	—	—	—
1997–98	Schwenninger Wild Wings	DEL	15	6	10	16	60	7	2	3	5	31
1998–99	Schwenninger Wild Wings	DEL	52	17	29	46	90	—	—	—	—	—
1999–00	Schwenninger Wild Wings	DEL	56	15	28	43	76	12	4	7	11	6
2000–01	Munich Barons	DEL	60	15	29	44	91	11	1	8	9	24
2001–02	Munich Barons	DEL	53	11	29	40	101	—	—	—	—	—
2002–03	Hamburg Freezers	DEL	41	20	32	52	74	5	1	1	2	16
2003–04	Hamburg Freezers	DEL	52	16	27	43	68	11	1	8	9	24
2004–05	Düsseldorfer EG	DEL	51	7	24	31	56	—	—	—	—	—
2005–06	Düsseldorfer EG	DEL	51	12	25	37	91	14	3	5	8	22
2006–07	Düsseldorfer EG	DEL	48	6	20	26	73	9	3	7	10	18
2007–08	EC KAC	EBEL	44	16	28	44	46	3	0	0	0	10
2008–09	EC KAC	EBEL	54	14	44	58	66	17	11	17	28	6
2009–10	EC KAC	EBEL	20	4	17	21	6	7	3	4	7	2
2010–11	EC KAC	EBEL	15	1	11	12	32	—	—	—	—	—
2010–11	Schwenninger Wild Wings	2.GBun	9	3	5	8	6	3	2	0	2	4
NHL totals			10	0	0	0	15	—	—	—	—	—
