= Swift Current Broncos =

Western Hockey League team in Swift Current, Saskatchewan

- City: Swift Current, Saskatchewan
- League: Western Hockey League
- Conference: Eastern
- Division: East
- Founded: 1967
- Home arena: InnovationPlex
- Colours: Blue, green, white, black
- General manager: Travis Crickard
- Head coach: Travis Crickard
- Website: chl.ca/whl-broncos/

Franchise history
- 1967–1974: Swift Current Broncos
- 1974–1986: Lethbridge Broncos
- 1986–present: Swift Current Broncos

Championships
- Regular season titles: 2 (1988–89, 1992–93)
- Playoff championships: Ed Chynoweth Cup 3 (1989, 1993, 2018); Memorial Cup 1 (1989); conference championship 1 (2018)

Current uniform

The Swift Current Broncos are a Canadian major junior ice hockey team based in Swift Current, Saskatchewan. Founded in 1967, the Broncos relocated to Lethbridge, Alberta in 1974, and were known as the Lethbridge Broncos, before returning to Swift Current in 1986. The team plays in the East Division of the Western Hockey League's Eastern Conference, and hosts games at Innovation Credit Union iPlex. Swift Current is the smallest city with a team in the WHL, and the second smallest across the entire Canadian Hockey League. The Broncos are three-time WHL playoff champions, and won the 1989 Memorial Cup. Before any of their championships, the Broncos were known for a 1986 team bus crash that resulted in the deaths of four players.

== History ==
=== Early years ===
The Broncos were founded in 1967, joining the fledgling Western Canada Hockey League. The team, playing in the league's smallest city and in the brand new Centennial Civic Centre, struggled on the ice, posting losing records in its first six seasons. The Broncos finally posted a winning record and won their first playoff series in 1973–74; however, struggling to stay afloat, the team's ownership relocated the club to Lethbridge, Alberta, home to a brand new arena, after the season. A new Swift Current Broncos team was founded to play in the Tier II junior Saskatchewan Junior Hockey League starting that year. However, the community desired a return to top-flight junior hockey, and by 1986 close to 200 investors banded together to purchase the Lethbridge Broncos—who had won a league championship in 1983—and return them to Swift Current as a community-owned club.

=== 1986 team bus crash ===
Only months into their first season back in Swift Current, on December 30, 1986, the Broncos' bus crashed in icy conditions on the way to a game in Regina. Several players were injured and four players were killed: Trent Kresse, Scott Kruger, Chris Mantyka, and Brent Ruff. Given the devastating tragedy, the team's board of directors discussed suspending operations for the remainder of the season. However, the players and coach, Graham James, voted to continue playing, and ultimately won out over a portion of the board that tried to suspend the team. The team refused professional counseling and turned down offers from other teams to loan players to the Broncos. The team called on prospects to fill out the roster and, led by star rookie Joe Sakic, who recorded 60 goals, earned the final playoff spot before bowing out in the first round.

Since the bus crash, the team has worn a commemorative patch in remembrance of the four players killed. In memory of the players, the league renamed its annual award for best player the Four Broncos Memorial Trophy. On December 30, 2016—30 years after the crash—a two-metre tall granite memorial was unveiled at the crash site.

=== Championships ===
The Broncos rapidly improved over the following two seasons, culminating in a 55-win season in 1988–89, securing the club's first Scotty Munro Trophy for best regular season record, led by the likes of Brian Sakic, Dan Lambert, and Tim Tisdale. In the playoffs, the team went undefeated en route to capturing the President's Cup and the right to play in the 1989 Memorial Cup tournament, hosted in Saskatoon. The Broncos lost their round-robin game against the Saskatoon Blades before facing the Blades in a re-match in the tournament final—it was the first ever Memorial Cup final contested between two teams from the WHL, let alone Saskatchewan. Despite losing a late lead that sent the game to overtime, Tisdale scored the sudden-death winner to give the Broncos the national championship. The final was played less than two-and-a-half years after the 1986 bus crash.

With Graham James still at the helm, the team remained competitive for several seasons, and captured a second league championship in 1992–93. At the 1993 Memorial Cup, the Broncos were eliminated in a tie-breaker. After the season, James resigned and worked on establishing an expansion team, which became the Calgary Hitmen. However, three years later, allegations arose that he sexually abused Sheldon Kennedy and one other former player during their time with the Broncos in the late 1980s. James pleaded guilty and was ultimately convicted and sentenced to three years in prison; he would later plead guilty to sexually assaulting another Broncos player in the early 1990s, among others.

After their 1993 league title, the Broncos would advance to just one more Conference Final before 2018, winning only a single playoff round between 2002 and 2017. 2017–18 saw the team post its most wins since 1992–93 and its fourth ever 100-point season. Led by Glenn Gawdin, Aleksi Heponiemi, and goaltender Stuart Skinner, the Broncos survived 7-game series against the Regina Pats and Moose Jaw Warriors, defeated the Lethbridge Hurricanes in the Conference Final, and then the Everett Silvertips in the Final for the Ed Chynoweth Cup and the Broncos' third league championship. At the 2018 Memorial Cup, hosted in Regina, the Broncos were eliminated after dropping their three round-robin matches, including to the host Pats who avenged their playoff series loss.

== Logo and jerseys ==
The Broncos' original logo featured a bucking bronco and horseshoe design with a blue and green colour scheme. The team minimized and then dropped green starting in 1995, before updating and adopting their original designs full-time in 2014.

In November 2018, a jersey honouring both the Swift Current Broncos and the Humboldt Broncos—another Saskatchewan junior team deeply affected by a fatal bus crash that occurred in April of that year—was unveiled and worn by both teams.

Like many junior teams, the Broncos frequently adopt limited-edition and special-event jerseys. In 2023, the team temporarily re-branded as the Lake Diefenbaker Slough Sharks, unveiling a new jersey featuring a northern pike logo.

== Season-by-season record ==
Note: GP = Games played, W = Wins, L = Losses, T = Ties, OTL = Overtime losses, Pts = Points, GF = Goals for, GA = Goals against

First Broncos (1967–1974)
Season	GP	W	L	T	—	GF	GA	Points	Finish	Playoffs
1967–68	60	16	38	6	–	242	343	38	9th Overall	Did not qualify
1968–69	60	14	44	2	–	186	329	30	4th West	Lost quarterfinal
1969–70	60	27	31	2	–	240	265	56	3rd West	Lost quarterfinal
1970–71	66	24	40	2	–	229	290	50	4th West	Lost quarterfinal
1971–72	68	25	42	1	–	242	311	51	5th East	Did not qualify
1972–73	68	27	35	6	–	300	359	60	5th East	Did not qualify
1973–74	68	35	24	9	–	240	306	79	3rd East	Lost semifinal
Second Broncos (1986–present)
Season	GP	W	L	T	OTL	GF	GA	Points	Finish	Playoffs
1986–87	72	28	40	4	–	331	393	60	6th East	Lost East Division quarterfinal
1987–88	72	44	26	2	–	388	312	90	4th East	Lost East Division semifinal
1988–89	72	55	16	1	–	447	319	111	1st East	Won Championship and Memorial Cup
1989–90	72	29	39	4	–	323	351	62	6th East	Lost in first round
1990–91	72	40	29	3	–	369	351	83	3rd East	Lost in first round
1991–92	72	35	33	4	–	296	313	74	5th East	Lost East Division semifinal
1992–93	72	49	21	2	–	384	267	100	1st East	Won Championship
1993–94	72	35	33	4	–	284	258	74	4th East	Lost East Division semifinal
1994–95	72	31	34	7	–	274	284	69	6th East	Lost in first round
1995–96	72	36	31	5	–	285	271	77	1st Central	Lost in first round
1996–97	72	44	23	5	–	336	243	93	2nd East	Lost Eastern Conference semifinal
1997–98	72	44	19	9	–	276	220	97	2nd East	Lost Eastern Conference semifinal
1998–99	72	34	32	6	–	232	211	74	4th East	Lost Eastern Conference quarterfinal
1999–2000	72	47	18	4	3	257	170	101	1st East	Lost Eastern Conference semifinal
2000–01	72	43	20	7	2	275	215	95	1st East	Lost Eastern Conference final
2001–02	72	42	17	6	7	274	218	97	2nd Central	Lost Eastern Conference semifinal
2002–03	72	38	24	7	3	240	215	86	2nd Central	Lost Eastern Conference quarterfinal
2003–04	72	36	29	7	0	234	209	79	4th Central	Lost Eastern Conference quarterfinal
2004–05	72	22	41	6	3	135	218	53	5th Central	Did not qualify
Season	GP	W	L	OTL	SOL	GF	GA	Pts	Finish	Playoffs
2005–06	72	24	34	6	8	175	242	62	4th Central	Lost Eastern Conference quarterfinal
2006–07	72	33	36	1	2	199	241	69	3rd East	Lost Eastern Conference quarterfinal
2007–08	72	41	24	1	6	244	205	89	3rd East	Lost Eastern Conference semifinal
2008–09	72	42	28	1	1	258	220	86	3rd East	Lost Eastern Conference quarterfinal
2009–10	72	37	30	1	4	231	232	79	3rd East	Lost Eastern Conference quarterfinal
2010–11	72	26	44	0	2	181	260	54	6th East	Did not qualify
2011–12	72	27	37	2	6	216	272	62	5th East	Did not qualify
2012–13	72	36	29	3	4	206	193	79	3rd East	Lost Eastern Conference quarterfinal
2013–14	72	38	25	3	6	248	229	85	2nd East	Lost Eastern Conference quarterfinal
2014–15	72	34	33	1	4	221	245	73	3rd East	Lost Eastern Conference quarterfinal
2015–16	72	24	38	7	3	189	249	58	5th East	Did not qualify
2016–17	72	39	23	4	6	247	239	88	3rd East	Lost Eastern Conference semifinal
2017–18	72	48	17	5	2	284	213	103	2nd East	Won Championship
2018–19	68	11	51	4	2	135	301	28	6th East	Did not qualify
2019–20	63	10	48	2	3	129	298	25	6th Central	Cancelled due to the COVID-19 pandemic
2020–21	24	6	16	2	0	72	108	14	7th East	No playoffs were held due to COVID-19 pandemic
2021–22	68	26	35	5	2	181	246	59	4th Central	Did not qualify
2022–23	68	31	33	1	3	227	242	66	5th Central	Did not qualify
2023–24	68	40	22	4	2	286	239	86	1st Central	Lost Eastern Conference semifinal
2024–25	68	35	30	1	2	240	256	73	4th East	Lost Eastern Conference quarterfinal
2025–26	68	15	44	4	5	179	326	39	6th East	Did not qualify

== Championship history ==
- Memorial Cup: 1989
- Ed Chynoweth Cup (3): 1988–89, 1992–93, 2017–18
- Conference championship (1): 2018
- Scotty Munro Memorial Trophy (2): 1988–89, 1992–93
- Regular Season Division Champions (6): 1988–89, 1992–93, 1995–96, 1999–2000, 2000–01, 2023–24

=== WHL Championship ===
- 1988–89: Win, 4–0 vs Portland Winter Hawks
- 1992–93: Win, 4–3 vs Portland Winter Hawks
- 2017–18: Win, 4–2 vs Everett Silvertips

=== Memorial Cup Championship ===
- 1989: Win, 4–3 (OT) vs Saskatoon Blades

== Players ==
=== NHL alumni ===
- Blair Atcheynum
- Warren Babe
- Ryan Bast
- Ken Baumgartner
- Rollie Boutin
- Willie Brossart
- Colby Cave
- Jakub Cutta
- Kimbi Daniels
- Jake DeBrusk
- Ron Delorme
- Ed Dyck
- Gary Emmons
- Kris Foucault
- Dallas Gaume
- Glenn Gawdin
- Larry Giroux
- Josh Green
- Dillon Heatherington
- Aleksi Heponiemi
- Ian Herbers
- Chris Herperger
- Shane Hnidy
- Milan Hnilicka
- Joel Hofer
- Bill Hogaboam
- Earl Ingarfield Jr.
- Jason Jaffray
- Trent Kaese
- Sheldon Kennedy
- Ladislav Kohn
- Don Kozak
- Maxime Lajoie
- Dan Lambert
- Lane Lambert
- Brad Larsen
- Jim Leavins
- Brett Lernout
- Adam Lowry
- Beck Malenstyn
- Dean Malkoc
- Dean McAmmond
- Trent McCleary
- Ryan McGill
- Todd McLellan
- Jim McTaggart
- Craig Millar
- John Negrin
- Lawrence Nycholat
- Jaroslav Obsut
- Bill Oleschuk
- Ben Ondrus
- Colton Orr
- Ed Patterson
- Lane Pederson
- Paul Postma
- Kelly Pratt
- Pokey Reddick
- Jeremy Reich
- Michal Rozsival
- Terry Ruskowski
- Joe Sakic
- Geoff Sanderson
- Andy Schneider
- Dave Schultz
- Cam Severson
- Trevor Sim
- Nathan Smith
- Zack Smith
- Brent Sopel
- Stuart Skinner
- Rocky Thompson
- Ryan Tobler
- Bryan Trottier
- Layne Ulmer
- Sergei Varlamov
- Dale Weise
- Ian White
- Bob Wilkie
- Jeremy Williams
- Tiger Williams
- Dody Wood
- Tyler Wright
- Joe Zanussi

=== Retired numbers ===
The Swift Current Broncos retired the jersey numbers of the four players who died in the 1986 team bus crash.

#	Player
8	Trent Kresse
9	Scott Krueger
11	Brent Ruff
22	Chris Mantyka

== Coaches ==
#	Coach	Years
1	Graham James	1986–1994
2	Todd McLellan	1994–2000
3	Brad McEwen	2000–2003
4	Randy Smith	2003–2004
5	Dean Chynoweth	2004–2009
6	Mark Lamb	2009–2016
7	Manny Viveiros	2016–2018
8	Dean Brockman	2018–2021
9	Devan Praught	2021–2023
10	Taras McEwen	2023–2025
11	Dean DeSilva	2025
12	Regan Darby†	2025–2026
13	Travis Crickard	2026-present
† Interim coach

== Team records ==
Team records for a single season
Statistic	Total	Season
Most points	111	1988–89
Most wins	55	1988–89
Longest win streak	12	1988–89; 1992–93
Longest loss streak	18	2018–19
Most goals for	447	1988–89
Fewest goals for	135	2004–05
Fewest goals against	170	1999–00
Most goals against	393	1986–87

Individual player records for a single season
Statistic	Player	Total	Season
Most goals	Jason Krywulak	81	1992–93
Most assists	Terry Ruskowski	93	1973–74
Most points	Jason Krywulak	162	1992–93
Most points, rookie	Joe Sakic	133	1986–87
Most points, defenceman	Dan Lambert	102	1988–89
Best GAA (goalie)	Bryce Wandler	2.06	1999–2000
Goalies = minimum 1500 minutes played

Career records
Statistic	Player	Total	Career
Most goals	Todd Holt	216	1989–1994
Most assists	Dan Lambert	244	1986–1990
Most points	Todd Holt	423	1989–1994
Most penalty minutes	Tiger Williams	854	1971–1974
Most games played	Brent Twordik	342	1997–2002
Most saves (goalie)	Kyle Moir	6,126	2002–2007
Most minutes (goalie)	Kyle Moir	12,792	2002–2007

=== Awards ===
Bob Clarke Trophy (WHL top scorer)

- Joe Sakic: 1987–88 (tied with Theoren Fleury, Moose Jaw Warriors)
- Jason Krywulak: 1992–93
- Sergei Varlamov: 1997–98
- Tyler Redenbach: 2003–04

Four Broncos Memorial Trophy (WHL player of the year)

- Joe Sakic (2): 1986–87 (East Division winner), 1987–88
- Jason Krywulak: 1992–93
- Sergei Varlamov: 1997–98
- Adam Lowry: 2012–13

Jim Piggott Memorial Trophy (WHL rookie of the year)

- Joe Sakic: 1986–87 (East Division winner)
- Ashley Buckberger: 1991–92
- Aleksi Heponiemi: 2016–17

Bill Hunter Memorial Trophy (WHL top defenceman)

- Dan Lambert: 1988–89
- Michal Rozsival: 1997–98

Del Wilson Trophy (WHL top goaltender)

- Bryce Wandler: 1999–2000

Dunc McCallum Memorial Trophy (WHL coach of the year)

- Stan Dunn: 1973–74
- Graham James: 1986–87 (East Division winner)
- Todd McLellan: 1999–00
- Manny Viveiros: 2017–18

Doc Seaman Trophy (WHL scholastic player of the year)

- Ashley Buckberger: 1991–92
- Adam Lowry: 2009–10

Brad Hornung Trophy (WHL most sportsmanslike)

- Rick Girard: 1992–93
- Ian White: 2001–02
- Tyler Steenbergen: 2016–17
- Aleksi Heponiemi: 2017–18

WHL Playoff MVP (Awarded since 1992)

- Andrew Schneider: 1992–93
- Glenn Gawdin: 2017–18

Stafford Smythe Memorial Trophy (Memorial Cup MVP)

- Dan Lambert: 1989 Memorial Cup

== See also ==
- Ice hockey in Saskatchewan
- List of ice hockey teams in Saskatchewan
