= Trevor Sim =

Canadian ice hockey player

- Born: June 9, 1970 (age 55) Calgary, Alberta, Canada
- Height: 6 ft 2 in (188 cm)
- Weight: 192 lb (87 kg; 13 st 10 lb)
- Position: Right wing
- Shot: Right
- Played for: Edmonton Oilers
- National team: Canada
- NHL draft: 53rd overall, 1988; Edmonton Oilers
- Playing career: 1989–1999

Trevor B. Sim (born June 9, 1970) is a Canadian former professional ice hockey forward who played most of his career in minor leagues.

Sim was born in Calgary, Alberta. He played junior hockey for four different Western Hockey League teams and was part of the Swift Current Broncos team that won the 1989 Memorial Cup. He was selected by the Edmonton Oilers in the third round of the 1988 NHL entry draft and made his National Hockey League debut in the 1989–90 season. Sim played in only three games with the Oilers and scored one assist. He was assigned to the minor league affiliate Cape Breton Oilers for the following season.

Sim played for the Canada national men's ice hockey team from 1992–94 and participated in the 1994 Winter Olympics. He spent the remainder of his career playing for teams in the AHL, ECHL, and IHL.

== Career statistics ==
=== Regular season and playoffs ===
| | | | Regular season | | | | | Playoffs |
| Season | Team | League | GP | G | A | Pts | PIM | GP | G | A | Pts | PIM |
|---|---|---|---|---|---|---|---|---|---|---|---|---|
| 1986–87 | Calgary Spurs | AJHL | 57 | 38 | 50 | 88 | 48 | — | — | — | — | — |
| 1986–87 | Seattle Thunderbirds | WHL | 4 | 2 | 0 | 2 | 0 | — | — | — | — | — |
| 1987–88 | Seattle Thunderbirds | WHL | 67 | 17 | 18 | 35 | 87 | — | — | — | — | — |
| 1988–89 | Regina Pats | WHL | 21 | 4 | 8 | 12 | 48 | — | — | — | — | — |
| 1988–89 | Swift Current Broncos | WHL | 42 | 16 | 19 | 35 | 69 | 11 | 10 | 6 | 16 | 20 |
| 1989–90 | Edmonton Oilers | NHL | 3 | 0 | 1 | 1 | 2 | — | — | — | — | — |
| 1989–90 | Swift Current Broncos | WHL | 6 | 3 | 2 | 5 | 21 | — | — | — | — | — |
| 1989–90 | Kamloops Blazers | WHL | 43 | 27 | 35 | 62 | 53 | 17 | 3 | 13 | 16 | 28 |
| 1990–91 | Cape Breton Oilers | AHL | 62 | 20 | 9 | 29 | 39 | 2 | 0 | 0 | 0 | 0 |
| 1991–92 | Cape Breton Oilers | AHL | 2 | 0 | 1 | 1 | 0 | — | — | — | — | — |
| 1991–92 | Winston-Salem Thunderbirds | ECHL | 53 | 25 | 29 | 54 | 110 | 5 | 7 | 2 | 9 | 4 |
| 1992–93 | Canadian National Team | Intl | 53 | 24 | 19 | 43 | 49 | — | — | — | — | — |
| 1993–94 | Milwaukee Admirals | IHL | 32 | 7 | 13 | 20 | 10 | 4 | 1 | 0 | 1 | 0 |
| 1994–95 | Syracuse Crunch | AHL | 3 | 2 | 0 | 2 | 0 | — | — | — | — | — |
| 1994–95 | Milwaukee Admirals | IHL | 37 | 9 | 10 | 19 | 26 | 7 | 1 | 2 | 3 | 4 |
| 1995–96 | Asiago Hockey 1935 | ITA | 7 | 1 | 4 | 5 | 12 | — | — | — | — | — |
| 1995–96 | Milwaukee Admirals | IHL | 7 | 0 | 0 | 0 | 0 | — | — | — | — | — |
| 1995–96 | Raleigh IceCaps | ECHL | 28 | 11 | 17 | 28 | 26 | 4 | 0 | 0 | 0 | 0 |
| 1995–96 | Canadian National Team | ECHL | 3 | 0 | 0 | 0 | 0 | — | — | — | — | — |
| 1996–97 | Orlando Solar Bears | IHL | 58 | 9 | 21 | 30 | 32 | 2 | 0 | 1 | 1 | 0 |
| 1997–98 | New Orleans Brass | ECHL | 13 | 4 | 11 | 15 | 23 | 4 | 0 | 3 | 3 | 2 |
| 1997–98 | Orlando Solar Bears | IHL | 36 | 8 | 3 | 11 | 17 | — | — | — | — | — |
| 1998–99 | Charlotte Checkers | ECHL | 9 | 3 | 5 | 8 | 12 | — | — | — | — | — |
| AHL totals | | | 67 | 22 | 10 | 32 | 39 | 2 | 0 | 0 | 0 | 0 |
| NHL totals | | | 3 | 0 | 1 | 1 | 2 | — | — | — | — | — |
