= Joe Sakic =

Canadian ice hockey player and executive (born 1969)

- Hockey Hall of Fame, 2012
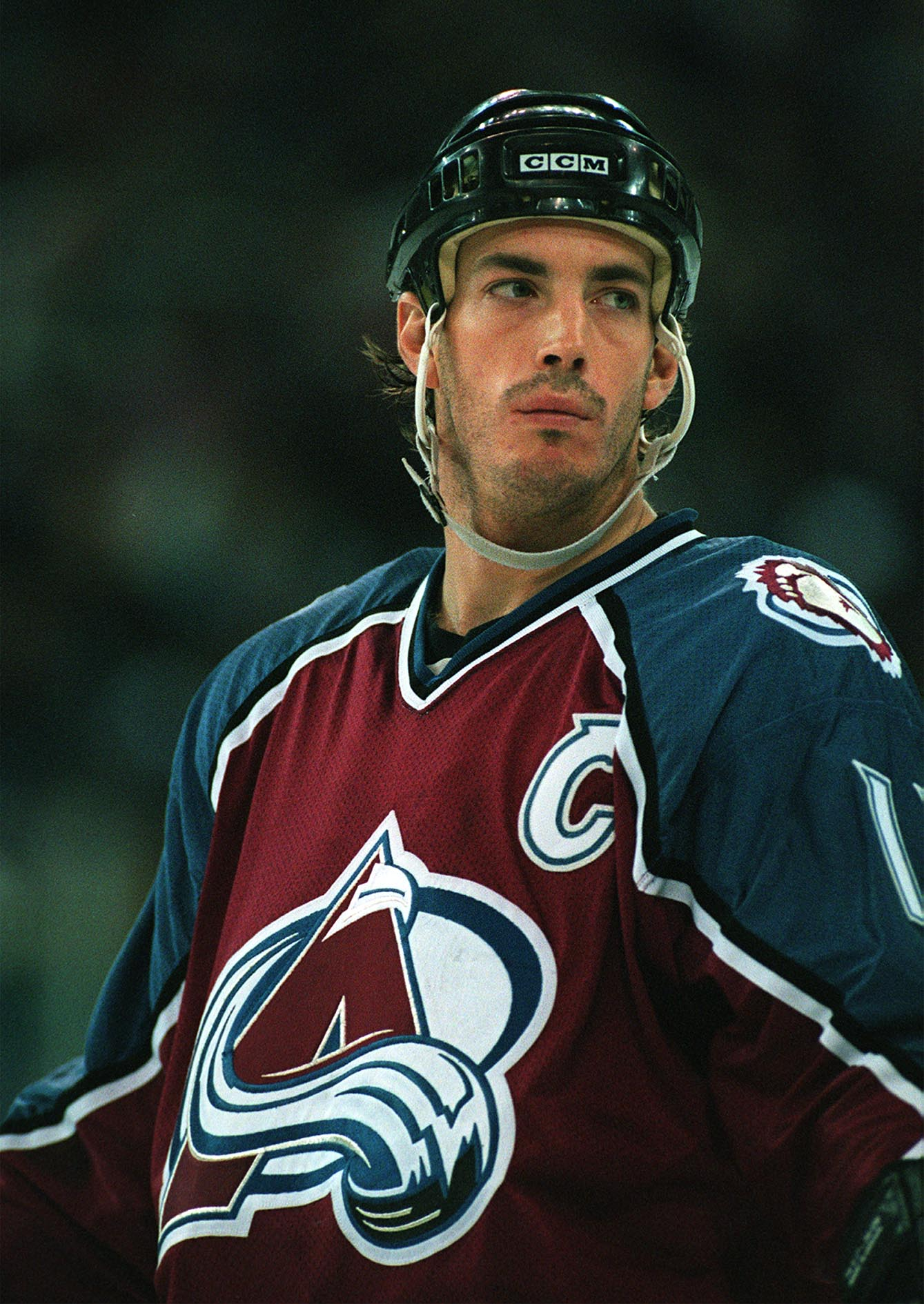
- Sakic with the Colorado Avalanche in 1997
- Born: July 7, 1969 (age 57) Burnaby, British Columbia, Canada
- Height: 5 ft 11 in (180 cm)
- Weight: 195 lb (88 kg; 13 st 13 lb)
- Position: Centre
- Shot: Left
- Played for: Quebec Nordiques; Colorado Avalanche
- National team: Canada
- NHL draft: 15th overall, 1987; Quebec Nordiques
- Playing career: 1988–2009

Joseph Steven Sakic (/ˈsækɪk/; (Croatian pronunciation: [ʃakitɕ]) born July 7, 1969) is a Canadian professional ice hockey executive and former player who currently serves as president of hockey operations and general manager of the Colorado Avalanche of the National Hockey League (NHL). He spent his entire 21-year NHL career, which lasted from 1988 to 2009, with the Quebec Nordiques/Colorado Avalanche franchise. Named captain of the team in 1992 (after serving as a co-captain in 1990–91).

Sakic is regarded as one of the greatest team leaders in league history and was able to consistently motivate his team to play at a winning level. Nicknamed "Burnaby Joe", Sakic was named to 13 NHL All-Star Games and selected to the NHL First All-Star Team at centre three times. Sakic led the Avalanche to two first-place regular season finishes in 1997 and 2001, and two Stanley Cup titles in 1996 and 2001, earning the most valuable player (MVP) in the 1996 playoffs. In 2001, Sakic earned both the Hart Memorial Trophy and Lester B. Pearson Award as MVP of the NHL. He is one of six players to participate in the first two of the team's Stanley Cup victories. He won the Stanley Cup a third time with the Avalanche in 2022 while serving as the team's general manager. Sakic became the fourth person, after Milt Schmidt, Serge Savard and Lester Patrick to win the Stanley Cup with the same franchise as a player and general manager.

Over his career, Sakic was one of the most productive forwards in the game, scoring 50 goals twice and earning at least 100 points in six different seasons. Sakic's wrist shot, considered one of the best in the NHL, was the source of much of his production as goalies around the league feared his rapid snap-shot release. At the conclusion of the 2008–09 NHL season, Sakic was the eighth all-time points leader in the NHL, as well as 14th in all-time goals and 11th in all-time assists. During the 2002 Winter Olympics, Sakic helped lead Team Canada to its first ice hockey gold medal in 50 years and was voted as the tournament's MVP. Sakic represented Team Canada in six other international competitions, including the 1998 and 2006 Winter Olympics.

Sakic retired from the NHL in 2009 and had his jersey number 19 retired prior to the Avalanche's 2009–10 season opener. In 2012, Sakic was inducted into the Hockey Hall of Fame. In 2013, Sakic was inducted into the Canada's Sports Hall of Fame. In 2017, Sakic was named one of the 100 Greatest NHL Players in history. He was also inducted into the IIHF Hall of Fame in 2017.

Two years after retiring as a player, Sakic returned to the Avalanche organization in a management capacity, first serving as executive advisor and alternate governor from 2011 to 2013. Sakic was promoted to executive vice president of hockey operations on May 10, 2013, and named general manager the following year. After overseeing a team rebuild, culminating in the franchise's third first-place regular season finish in 2021, and a Stanley Cup victory in 2022, Sakic won the Jim Gregory General Manager of the Year Award. The team announced shortly thereafter that Sakic was being promoted to president of hockey operations. Following the departure of his successor Chris MacFarland in 2026, Sakic re-assumed the role of general manager. Sakic has spent all but three years of his adult life with the Nordiques/Avalanche as a player or executive, being a member of all three Stanley Cups and four Presidents' Trophies in franchise history.

== Early life ==
Sakic was born in Burnaby, British Columbia, to Marijan and Slavica Šakić (Croatian pronunciation: [ʃakitɕ]), immigrants from Croatia. Growing up in Burnaby, Sakic did not learn to speak English until kindergarten, having been raised with Croatian as his mother tongue. At the age of four, Sakic attended his first NHL game, a match between the Vancouver Canucks and Atlanta Flames. After watching the game, Sakic decided that he wanted to become a hockey player. As a smaller player, Sakic was forced to use skill rather than size to excel and modelled himself after his idol, Wayne Gretzky. After showing exceptional promise as a young hockey player, Sakic was referred to as a new Wayne Gretzky in the making. Sakic scored 83 goals and 156 points in 80 games for Burnaby BC Selects while attending school at Burnaby North Secondary. Soon after, he was added to the Lethbridge Broncos of the Western Hockey League (WHL) for the last part of the 1985–86 season.

During the 1986–87 season, the Broncos relocated to Swift Current, Saskatchewan, becoming the Swift Current Broncos. Sakic, playing in his first full season, scored 60 goals and 73 assists for 133 points. These totals saw him named Rookie of the Year of the WHL. But while Sakic enjoyed success on the ice, he and his team faced a tragedy on the night of December 30, 1986. The Broncos were driving to a game against the Regina Pats and due to bad weather conditions, the bus crashed after the driver lost control on a patch of black ice outside of Swift Current. While Sakic was unharmed, four of his teammates (Trent Kresse, Scott Kruger, Chris Mantyka, and Brent Ruff) were killed. This incident had a lasting impact on the young Sakic, who declined to talk about the crash throughout his career. The next year, in 1987–88, Sakic was named the WHL Most Valuable Player and Canadian Major Junior Player of the Year. He scored 160 points (78 goals, 82 assists), tying him with Theoren Fleury of the Moose Jaw Warriors for the WHL scoring title.

== NHL career ==
=== Quebec Nordiques ===
Sakic was drafted 15th overall by the Quebec Nordiques in the 1987 NHL entry draft, a pick the Nordiques received when they traded away Dale Hunter and Clint Malarchuk to the Washington Capitals. Rather than make the immediate jump into the NHL, Sakic told Nordiques management he would prefer to spend the 1987–88 season in Swift Current to prepare for the NHL. Sakic made his professional debut on October 6, 1988, against the Hartford Whalers and registered an assist. His first NHL goal came two days later against goaltender Sean Burke of the New Jersey Devils. During the season, Sakic wore number 88, because his preferred number 19 was already taken by a teammate, Alain Côté. While considered a front-runner for rookie of the year due to his rapid scoring pace, an ankle injury forced Sakic to miss 10 games in December. The resulting scoring slump helped quash any hopes of winning the award. Sakic would finish his rookie season with 62 points in 70 games, finishing eighth in voting for the Calder. Defenceman Brian Leetch won the rookie scoring race with 28 goals and 48 assists, receiving forty-two first-place votes, while Sakic only received two third-place votes.

In 1989–90, his second NHL season, Sakic was able to switch back to his familiar number 19 (Alain Côté had retired over the summer) and scored 102 points, which was ninth overall in the league, becoming the first player in NHL history to score 100 points on a last place team. At the start of the next season, 1990–91, Sakic was named co-captain of the Nordiques along with Steven Finn (Sakic was captain for home games, Finn for away games). Sakic again passed the 100 point mark, improving to 109 points and sixth overall in the league but would slip during the 1991–92 season to 94 points after missing 11 games. In 1991–92, Mike Hough became captain of the Nordiques, while Sakic and Finn became alternate captains. Sakic began to display the leadership for which he would become known, standing firm during the tumultuous Eric Lindros holdout. With Lindros refusing to play for the Nordiques, one of the worst teams in league, Sakic commented, "We only want players here who have the passion to play the game. I'm tired of hearing that name. He's not here and there are a lot of others in this locker room who really care about the game." Lindros was traded a year later, ending the situation and bringing in a number of quality players who vastly improved the Nordiques. During their first four seasons with Joe Sakic, the Nordiques finished last place in the Adams Division and last in the league for three straight years, from 1989 to 1991.

Starting with the 1992–93 season, Sakic became the sole captain of the franchise. Under his leadership, the Nordiques made the playoffs for the first time in six years and set a franchise record for wins and points in the process (since broken by the 2021–22 Colorado Avalanche team). Sakic reached the 100-point plateau, the third time in five years, scoring 48 goals and 105 points in the regular season while adding another six points in the playoffs. After the shortened 1994–95 following the 1994–95 NHL lock-out, Sakic finished eight points behind Jaromír Jágr for the scoring title, finishing fourth place overall, and helped the Nordiques win the division title, their first since the 1985–86 season.

=== Colorado Avalanche ===
In May 1995, the Nordiques announced that the team had been sold and were relocating from Quebec. The franchise then moved to Denver, Colorado, and were renamed the Colorado Avalanche. Sakic led the team to a Stanley Cup championship in its first year, scoring 120 points in 82 regular season games and 34 points in 22 playoff games. Sakic was awarded the Conn Smythe Trophy as the most valuable player of the 1996 NHL playoffs. During the run for the Cup, Sakic again proved himself to be an effective team leader. Although his Nordiques had missed the playoffs in five of his first seven years in the NHL, he scored 18 goals, including six game-winners, and 34 points. Sakic was one goal away from the record for goals in a playoff year, and his game-winning goals established a new record.

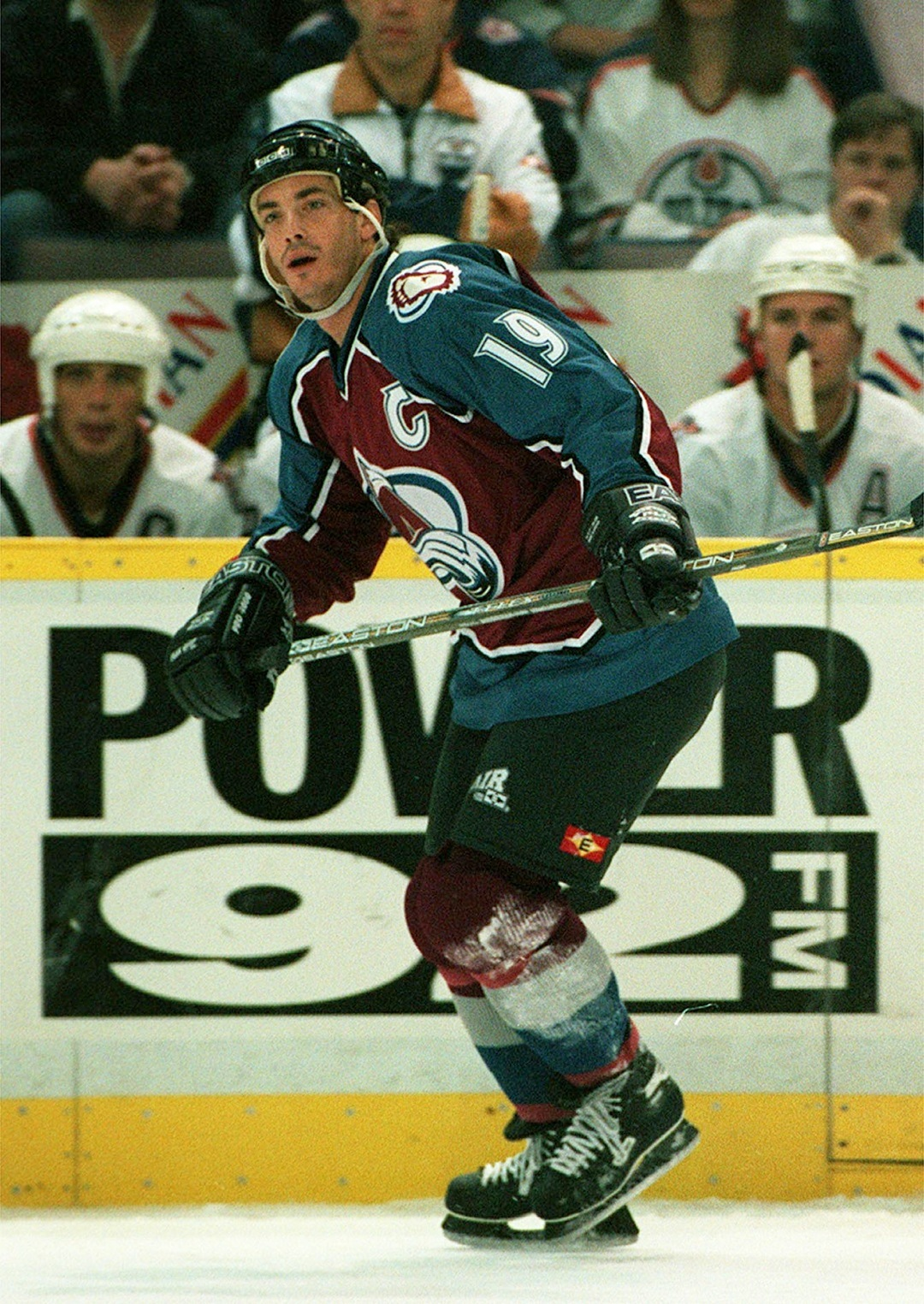
Sakic playing with the Avalanche in 1997

In the 1996–97 season, Sakic played in only 65 games due to a lacerated calf yet still managed to score 74 points as the Avalanche earned their first Presidents' Trophy and third straight division title. Sakic had another great playoff season with eight goals and 17 assists and took the Avalanche all the way to the conference finals, where they eventually lost to the Detroit Red Wings in six games. As a free agent during the summer of 1997, Sakic signed a three-year, $21 million offer sheet with the New York Rangers as a restricted free agent. Under the collective bargaining agreement at the time, the Avalanche had one week to match the Rangers' offer or let go of Sakic in exchange for five first-round draft picks as compensation. While it seemed as if the Avalanche could not afford to keep Sakic, as they had already committed large amounts of salary to Peter Forsberg and Patrick Roy, an unlikely lifeline would appear in the form of the summer blockbuster movie Air Force One, produced by Avalanche owners COMSAT. Its profits enabled the Avalanche to match the offer, which instigated a salary raise for many NHL players.

Injuries would again limit Sakic's playing time during the 1997–98 season. While playing in his first Olympics with Team Canada, Sakic hurt his knee and was forced to miss 18 games with the Avalanche. In the 64 games in which he did play, Sakic still scored 63 points, enough to earn him his seventh all-star appearance. Sakic finally rebounded from his injuries in the 1998–99 season, finishing fifth in the league in scoring with 41 goals and 96 points in only 73 games. Sakic led the Avalanche to within one game of the Stanley Cup Final, where they lost to the eventual champion Dallas Stars. After the season ended, Sakic ranked number 94 on The Hockey News' list of the 100 greatest hockey players.

During the 1999–2000 season, Sakic reached several career milestones. Injuries limited him to only 60 games, but he still managed to lead the team in scoring with 81 points. On December 27, 1999, against the St. Louis Blues, Sakic earned an assist to become the 56th player in NHL history to reach 1,000 career points. Later in the season, on March 23, 2000, he scored a hat-trick against the Phoenix Coyotes and became the 59th player to score 400 career goals. It also gave Sakic 1,049 points with the franchise, passing Peter Šťastný as the all-time leader on the team.

Sakic eclipsed the 100 point mark again in 2000–01, finishing with 118 points along with a career-best 54 goals, both second-best in the league. Sakic won the Hart Memorial Trophy, the Lady Byng Memorial Trophy and the Lester B. Pearson Award (the latter presented to him by former Nordiques mentor Peter Šťastný) while also being a finalist for the Frank J. Selke Trophy. Sakic led the Avalanche to their second Stanley Cup championship, defeating the defending title holding New Jersey Devils in seven games. Memorably, after receiving the Stanley Cup from NHL Commissioner Gary Bettman, Sakic broke with tradition. Instead of hoisting it first as most captains do, Sakic passed the cup straight to Ray Bourque, a player who had waited a record-breaking 22 seasons to win the Stanley Cup.

Sakic led the Avalanche in scoring again in the 2001–02 season, finishing sixth in the league with 79 points. On March 9, 2002, Sakic played in his 1,000th career game. The Avalanche once again reached the Western Conference Finals but lost to the eventual cup-winning Detroit Red Wings. The following year, Sakic appeared in only 58 games and finished with just 58 points. Sakic rebounded the following year, finishing third in the league with 87 points. It also marked the first time since the 1993–94 season that the franchise did not win the division title, which was won by the Vancouver Canucks.

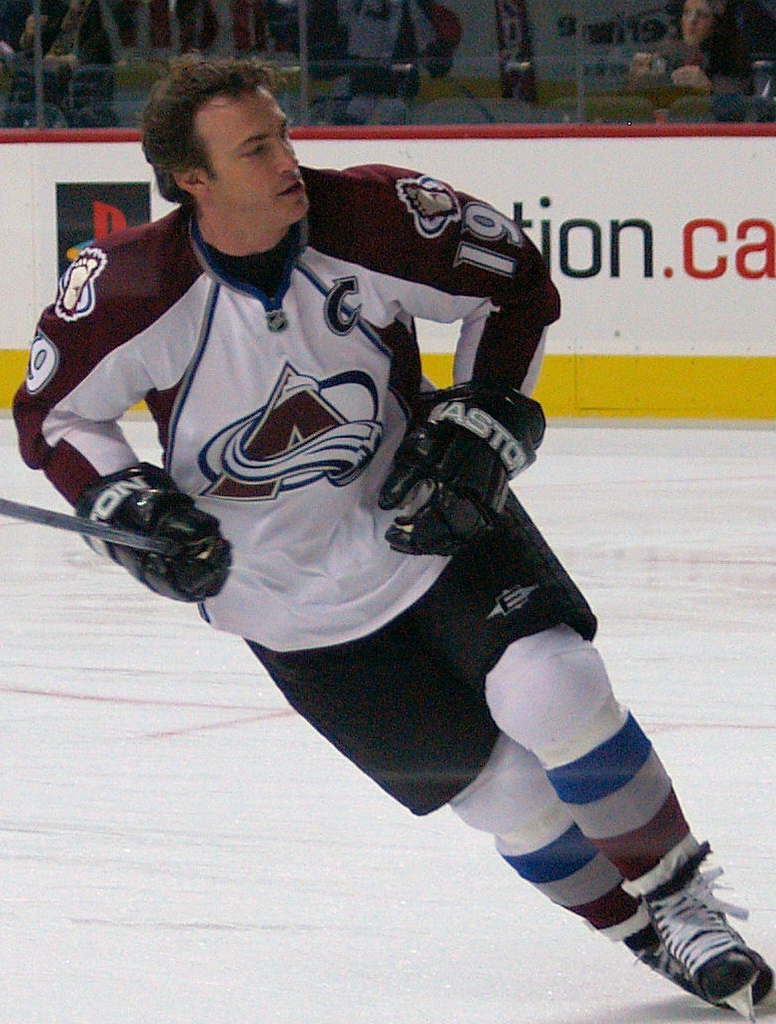
Sakic warming up before a game in 2007

Following the 2004–05 NHL lock-out, the Avalanche were forced to lose many of their key players in order to stay below the salary cap. Even with the loss of teammates Peter Forsberg and Adam Foote, Sakic still helped the Avalanche get into the playoffs, where they eventually lost to the Anaheim Ducks in the conference semi-finals. In June 2006, Sakic signed a one-year, $5.75 million deal to keep him with the Avalanche for the 2006–07 season. Upon the retirement of Steve Yzerman a month later, on July 3, 2006, Sakic became the league leader for most career points among active players.

Sakic had another strong season in the 2006–07. He scored his 600th career goal on February 15, 2007, against the Calgary Flames, becoming the 17th player in history to reach the milestone and third that year. On the final day of the regular season, Sakic scored his 100th point, reaching the milestone for the sixth time in his career. At the same time, Sakic became the second-oldest NHL player to score 100 points in a season at age 37, alongside hockey legend Gordie Howe. Despite his efforts, as well as a late-season charge, Sakic and the Avalanche missed the playoffs for the first time in 11 years, finishing one point behind the eighth placed Calgary Flames. On May 1, the NHL announced that Sakic was named as one of the three finalists for the Lady Byng Trophy, but it was eventually awarded to Pavel Datsyuk of the Detroit Red Wings.

In April 2007, Sakic signed to a 19th NHL season with the Avalanche on a one-year deal for the 2007–08 season. Sakic commented on the deal, saying, "at this stage in my career, I prefer to do one-year deals as I evaluate my play year-to-year." Upon signing Sakic to the deal, Avalanche General Manager François Giguère said, "Joe is the heart of this organization and his leadership and value to this team and especially our young players is unquestioned." On October 7, 2007, he scored a goal and had an assist against the San Jose Sharks, moving past Phil Esposito into eighth place on the NHL career points list with 1,591 points. Nineteen days later, Sakic scored a goal and assisted Ryan Smyth for an overtime game-winning goal against the Calgary Flames, reaching his 1,600th point in the NHL. On December 27, 2007, it was announced that Sakic underwent hernia surgery to accelerate the recovery of an injury that had forced him to miss the previous 12 games after a 232 consecutive games-played streak. The operation caused him to miss a career-high 38 games. He was activated off injured reserve on February 24 and played that night, recording an assist. On March 22, 2008, Sakic recorded his 1,000th career assist against the Edmonton Oilers, becoming the 11th player in NHL history to reach the milestone.

In June 2008, Sakic spoke with Colorado General Manager François Giguère and said he was uncertain with his future with the Avalanche. However, it was announced on August 27, 2008, that Sakic would sign a one-year contract with the team. Injuries limited Sakic's playing time in 2008–09. After 15 games, in which he scored 12 points, a herniated disk forced Sakic to stop playing in early November. While at home letting his back heal, Sakic broke three fingers in a snow-blower accident.

Sakic announced his retirement on July 9, 2009 The Avalanche retired his jersey number 19 prior to their 2009–10 season opener on October 1, 2009, with a "C" on the banner to represent his lengthy service as team captain (having been the only captain of the Avalanche until he retired). The Avalanche also named Sakic the inaugural member of the Avalanche Alumni Association.

=== All-Star Games ===
Sakic was voted into the NHL All-Star Game 13 times and played in 12 of them, serving as a captain for two, the last in 2007. He had at least one point in 11 of them. The only one Sakic missed was the 1997 All-Star Game due to injury. Sakic won the MVP award in the 2004 All-Star Game after scoring a hat trick, despite the Western Conference losing the game. He is the all-time assist leader in All-Star Games with 16 assists and is third place in all-time all-star scoring with 22 points, behind Mario Lemieux (23 points) and Wayne Gretzky (25 points). His best record in an All-Star Game was in 2007, when he scored four assists for the winning team; however, the MVP award was given to Daniel Brière, who had a goal and four assists.

== International play ==
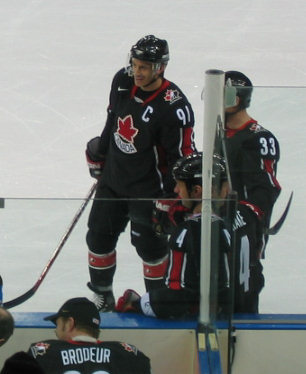
- Sakic (no. 91) at the 2006 Olympics

Medal record

Representing Canada

Olympics
| Gold medal – first place | 2002 Salt Lake City | |

World Championships
| Gold medal – first place | 1994 Italy | |
| Silver medal – second place | 1991 Finland | |

World Cup
| Gold medal – first place | 2004 World Cup | |
| Silver medal – second place | 1996 World Cup | |

World Junior Championships
| Gold medal – first place | 1988 Soviet Union | |

Sakic had an extensive international hockey career, representing Canada in seven international competitions. After being drafted by the Nordiques in 1987, Sakic went on to help the Canadian junior team win the 1988 World Junior Championship. Sakic's next tournament was the 1991 World Championships, in which Team Canada won the silver medal and Sakic contributed eleven points in ten games. Sakic tried out for the 1991 Canada Cup Canadian team but was the first player to be cut, being cited for his weak leg strength. Sakic was bitter about the experience, feeling he was not given a good enough chance to prove himself, and called the whole experience "a complete waste of time."

Sakic's first successful professional tournament was the 1994 World Championships, in which Canada won its first gold medal in the tournament since 1961. Sakic's seven points in eight games were a crucial part of the team's success. During the 1996 World Cup of Hockey, Sakic played only a minor role in Canada's second-place finish as he scored one goal and two assists in six games. However, the tournament allowed Sakic to showcase that he was indeed a dominant player who had simply been overlooked.

Sakic's first Olympic appearance came in 1998 at Nagano, Japan, the first tournament in which NHL players participated. Bothered by a knee injury, Sakic scored only three points in four games as the Canadian squad failed to meet expectations and finished fourth. Sakic's second Olympic appearance came in 2002 in Salt Lake City; led by his strong play, the Canadian team reached the gold medal match against Team USA, in which Sakic scored four points and helped Canada to its first gold medal in 50 years. Sakic was later named MVP of the tournament with a cumulative tally of four goals and six assists and became one of the first Canadian members of the Triple Gold Club. Sakic also played a part in Canada's triumph in the 2004 World Cup of Hockey, where he scored six points in six games.

On December 21, 2005, Sakic was named captain of Canada for the 2006 Winter Olympics in Turin, Italy. Once again, Canada was heavily favoured to win and given high expectations, but they failed to medal, finishing seventh overall. Sakic finished the tournament with three points.

== Executive career ==
After he retired, Sakic decided to take time off from hockey and spent time with his family. In 2011, two years after his retirement, Sakic returned to the Avalanche to work in their front office. Sakic was named an executive advisor and alternate governor of the team, effective at the end of the 2010–11 season. In his role as an advisor, Sakic advised the team in hockey-related matters. As an alternate governor, Sakic represented the team at Board of Governors meetings.

On June 26, 2012, Sakic was selected to the Hockey Hall of Fame in his first year of eligibility. He was inducted into the Hockey Hall of Fame on November 12, 2012, along with Mats Sundin, Pavel Bure, and Adam Oates. Sakic was the only member of his class who won the Stanley Cup during his career.

On May 10, 2013, the Avalanche promoted Sakic to executive vice president of hockey operations. In this expanded role, Sakic had the final say on all matters regarding hockey personnel. During Patrick Roy's tenure as head coach, they shared most of the duties normally held by a general manager. General Manager Greg Sherman remained in his post but served mainly in an advisory role to Roy and Sakic. This de facto arrangement was formalized the following season, when Sakic was formally named general manager and Sherman was demoted to assistant general manager.

Sakic's tenure as general manager faced early adversity, notably in the 2016–17 season, in which the team finished in last place and managed only 48 points in the standings. Sakic later admitted that at points he was to be relieved by team ownership in midst of the poor results. Despite finishing last, the team did not win any of the top three lottery picks in the 2017 NHL entry draft, dropping to fourth. This seeming misfortune would later prove beneficial, as it led to the Avalanche selecting future Norris Trophy-winning defenceman Cale Makar at fourth overall. The poor season also perpetuated a trade request from star player Matt Duchene, which Sakic would ultimately translate into several assets, including defencemen Sam Girard and Bowen Byram. In later years, Sakic would make additional trades for Nazem Kadri, Devon Toews, and Artturi Lehkonen, and sign Valeri Nichushkin as a free agent. The Avalanche won the Presidents' Trophy for the 2020–21 season but faltered in the second round of the playoffs for the third consecutive season. The Avalanche finished second in the regular season the following year but won the Stanley Cup. Sakic became only the third person, after Milt Schmidt and Serge Savard, to win a Stanley Cup with the same franchise as a player and general manager. In recognition of his work for the 2021–22 season, Sakic received the Jim Gregory General Manager of the Year Award.

On July 11, 2022, the Avalanche announced that Sakic would be ceding the general manager title to longtime assistant Chris MacFarland and assuming a new role as president of hockey operations. Following MacFarland's departure to the Nashville Predators on June 2, 2026, Sakic re-assumed the role of general manager.

== Personal life ==
Sakic and his wife Debbie have three children: son Mitchell, born 1996, and fraternal twins, son Chase and daughter Kamryn, born October 2000. Sakic and his wife met at a local high school while he was playing in Swift Current, and they frequently return to the town during the off-season. Sakic is an avid golfer and competed in the celebrity pro am golf tournament in Lake Tahoe in the summer of 2006. Each summer during his playing career, Sakic also hosted his own charity golf tournament, which benefited the Food Bank of the Rockies. Sakic's charity work is estimated to have provided more than seven million meals to poor children and families and earned him an NHL Foundation Player Award in 2007.

Sakic is a fan favourite in his hometown of Burnaby, where a street has been named Joe Sakic Way in his honour. Throughout British Columbia, Sakic is known as "Burnaby Joe". In Colorado, Sakic is known as "Super Joe." His younger brother Brian joined the Swift Current Broncos during Joe's final season with the team and later played for the Flint Generals of the United Hockey League.

== Career statistics ==
=== Regular season and playoffs ===
| | | | Regular season | | | | | Playoffs |
| Season | Team | League | GP | G | A | Pts | PIM | GP | G | A | Pts | PIM |
|---|---|---|---|---|---|---|---|---|---|---|---|---|
| 1985–86 | Burnaby BC Selects | BCAHA | 80 | 83 | 73 | 156 | 96 | — | — | — | — | — |
| 1985–86 | Lethbridge Broncos | WHL | 3 | 0 | 0 | 0 | 0 | — | — | — | — | — |
| 1986–87 | Swift Current Broncos | WHL | 72 | 60 | 73 | 133 | 31 | 4 | 0 | 1 | 1 | 0 |
| 1987–88 | Swift Current Broncos | WHL | 64 | 78 | 82 | 160 | 64 | 10 | 11 | 13 | 24 | 12 |
| 1988–89 | Quebec Nordiques | NHL | 70 | 23 | 39 | 62 | 24 | — | — | — | — | — |
| 1989–90 | Quebec Nordiques | NHL | 80 | 39 | 63 | 102 | 27 | — | — | — | — | — |
| 1990–91 | Quebec Nordiques | NHL | 80 | 48 | 61 | 109 | 24 | — | — | — | — | — |
| 1991–92 | Quebec Nordiques | NHL | 69 | 29 | 65 | 94 | 20 | — | — | — | — | — |
| 1992–93 | Quebec Nordiques | NHL | 78 | 48 | 57 | 105 | 40 | 6 | 3 | 3 | 6 | 2 |
| 1993–94 | Quebec Nordiques | NHL | 84 | 28 | 64 | 92 | 18 | — | — | — | — | — |
| 1994–95 | Quebec Nordiques | NHL | 47 | 19 | 43 | 62 | 30 | 6 | 4 | 1 | 5 | 0 |
| 1995–96 | Colorado Avalanche | NHL | 82 | 51 | 69 | 120 | 44 | 22 | 18 | 16 | 34 | 14 |
| 1996–97 | Colorado Avalanche | NHL | 65 | 22 | 52 | 74 | 34 | 17 | 8 | 17 | 25 | 14 |
| 1997–98 | Colorado Avalanche | NHL | 64 | 27 | 36 | 63 | 50 | 6 | 2 | 3 | 5 | 6 |
| 1998–99 | Colorado Avalanche | NHL | 73 | 41 | 55 | 96 | 29 | 19 | 6 | 13 | 19 | 8 |
| 1999–00 | Colorado Avalanche | NHL | 60 | 28 | 53 | 81 | 28 | 17 | 2 | 7 | 9 | 8 |
| 2000–01 | Colorado Avalanche | NHL | 82 | 54 | 64 | 118 | 30 | 21 | 13 | 13 | 26 | 6 |
| 2001–02 | Colorado Avalanche | NHL | 82 | 26 | 53 | 79 | 18 | 21 | 9 | 10 | 19 | 4 |
| 2002–03 | Colorado Avalanche | NHL | 58 | 26 | 32 | 58 | 24 | 7 | 6 | 3 | 9 | 2 |
| 2003–04 | Colorado Avalanche | NHL | 81 | 33 | 54 | 87 | 42 | 11 | 7 | 5 | 12 | 8 |
| 2005–06 | Colorado Avalanche | NHL | 82 | 32 | 55 | 87 | 60 | 9 | 4 | 5 | 9 | 6 |
| 2006–07 | Colorado Avalanche | NHL | 82 | 36 | 64 | 100 | 46 | — | — | — | — | — |
| 2007–08 | Colorado Avalanche | NHL | 44 | 13 | 27 | 40 | 20 | 10 | 2 | 8 | 10 | 0 |
| 2008–09 | Colorado Avalanche | NHL | 15 | 2 | 10 | 12 | 6 | — | — | — | — | — |
| NHL totals | | | 1,378 | 625 | 1,016 | 1,641 | 614 | 172 | 84 | 104 | 188 | 78 |

=== International ===
| Year | Team | Event | GP | G | A | Pts | PIM |
|---|---|---|---|---|---|---|---|
| 1988 | Canada | WJC | 7 | 3 | 1 | 4 | 2 |
| 1991 | Canada | WC | 10 | 6 | 5 | 11 | 0 |
| 1994 | Canada | WC | 8 | 4 | 3 | 7 | 0 |
| 1996 | Canada | WCH | 8 | 2 | 2 | 4 | 6 |
| 1998 | Canada | OLY | 4 | 1 | 2 | 3 | 4 |
| 2002 | Canada | OLY | 6 | 4 | 3 | 7 | 0 |
| 2004 | Canada | WCH | 6 | 4 | 2 | 6 | 2 |
| 2006 | Canada | OLY | 6 | 1 | 2 | 3 | 0 |
| Junior totals | | | 7 | 3 | 1 | 4 | 2 |
| Senior totals | | | 48 | 22 | 19 | 41 | 39 |

=== All-Star games ===
| Year | Location | G | A | Pts |
|---|---|---|---|---|
| 1990 | Pittsburgh | 0 | 2 | 2 |
| 1991 | Chicago | 0 | 1 | 1 |
| 1992 | Philadelphia | 0 | 2 | 2 |
| 1993 | Montreal | 0 | 3 | 3 |
| 1994 | New York | 1 | 2 | 3 |
| 1996 | Boston | 0 | 0 | 0 |
| 1998 | Vancouver | 0 | 2 | 2 |
| 2000 | Toronto | 1 | 0 | 1 |
| 2001 | Denver | 1 | 0 | 1 |
| 2002 | Los Angeles | 0 | 0 | 0 |
| 2004 | St. Paul | 3 | 0 | 3 |
| 2007 | Dallas | 0 | 4 | 4 |
| All-Star totals | | 6 | 16 | 22 |

== Legacy ==
=== Milestones ===
Sakic recorded his 1,000th career point on December 27, 1999, against the St. Louis Blues. Sakic became the 11th player to reach 1,500 points, doing so on October 25, 2006, with an assist against the Washington Capitals, and the sixth to do so with one franchise. Gordie Howe, Wayne Gretzky, Mario Lemieux, Ray Bourque, and Steve Yzerman are the others who achieved this feat.

Sakic played his 1,000th career game on March 9, 2002, against the Los Angeles Kings. Sakic's 500th career goal came against the Vancouver Canucks on December 11, 2002. In a February 15, 2007, game against the Calgary Flames, Sakic scored his 600th career goal. He also earned his 900th assist, the 16th player to do so, against the Flames in a game on March 12, 2006.

During the final game of the 2006–07 season, Sakic scored his 100th point of the year. This made him, at age 37, the second oldest player in NHL history, after Gordie Howe, to record 100 points in a regular season. Sakic became the longest active tenured captain in the league, with fifteen seasons leading the Nordiques/Avalanche franchise, after the retirement of Steve Yzerman at the conclusion of the 2005–06 regular season. On March 22, 2008, against the Edmonton Oilers, Sakic recorded the 1,000th assist of his career, the 11th player to do so. The gloves he wore in the game were later sent to the Hockey Hall of Fame.

Alongside Bobby Clarke, Wayne Gretzky, and Mark Messier, Sakic is one of four players to captain his team to a Stanley Cup championship and win the Hart Memorial Trophy in the same year. Sakic is also a member of the Triple Gold Club, a term used in hockey to describe players who have won an Olympic gold medal, a World Championship gold medal and the Stanley Cup.

=== Records ===
Sakic retired holding almost every scoring record in Nordiques/Avalanche franchise history, including most all-time goals (625), assists (1,016) and points (1,641). He also holds the franchise record for most games played (1,363). Sakic also holds several notable NHL records, including most All-Star game assists (16) and most playoff overtime goals (8).

=== Leadership ===
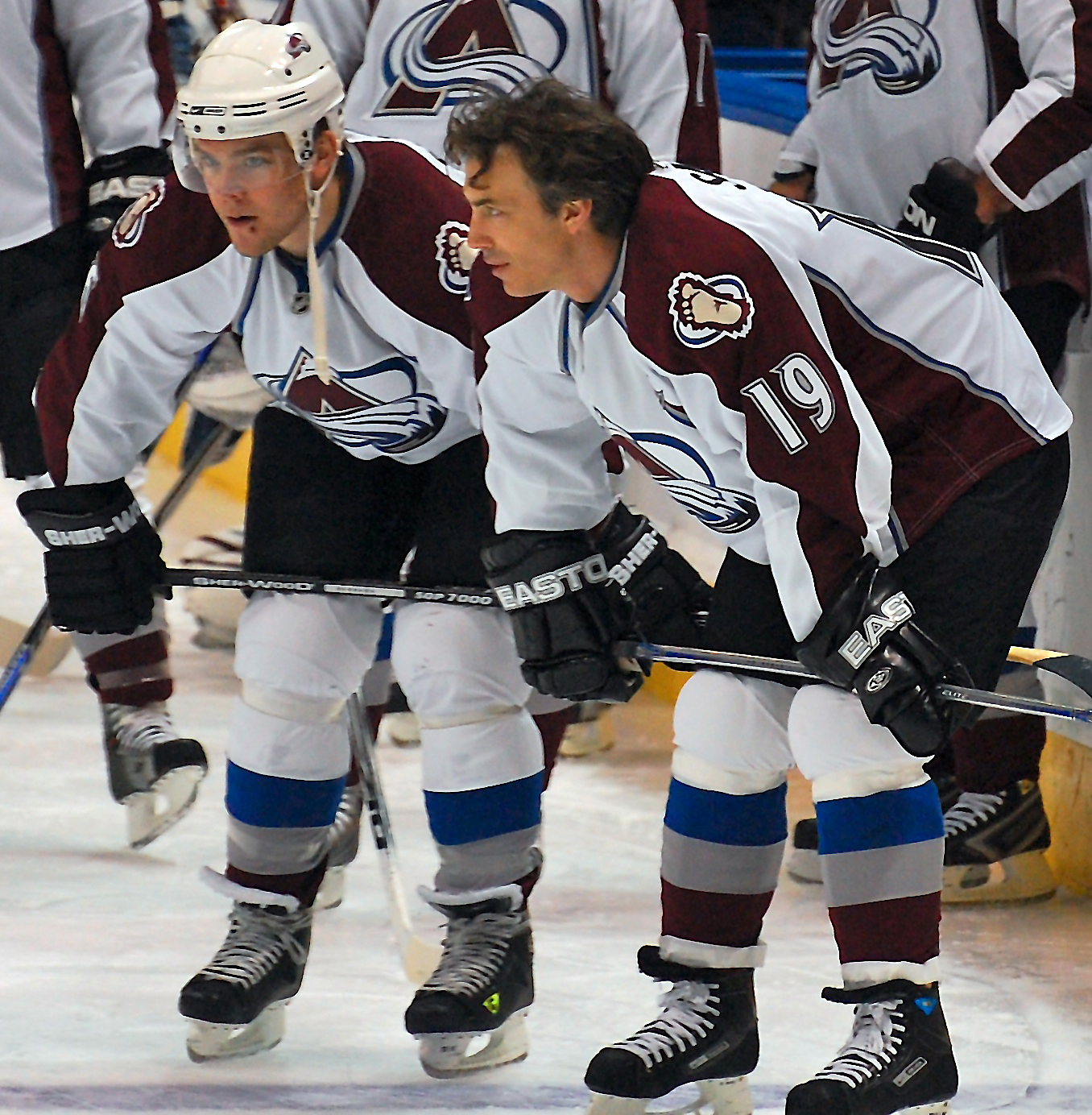
Sakic with Paul Šťastný. When Sakic entered the NHL, he was mentored by Peter Šťastný, Paul's father.

Throughout his career, Sakic was one of the top scorers in the league; but in his early years, he was criticized for not leading his team to playoff success. While in Quebec, the Nordiques were one of the worst teams in the league, finishing last in their division five out of the seven years Sakic was with the team, including three straight years of being last overall in the league. After leading the Avalanche to the Stanley Cup in 1996 with his 34 playoff points, Sakic began to be seen as capable of leading a team to success, and he was seen as one of the league's premier players.

Though Sakic was a quiet individual, he was able to motivate his team to play at higher levels, which earned him the respect of his peers and executives. The first signs of Sakic's leadership began to show while still a member of the Swift Current Broncos of the WHL. After the bus crash that killed four of his teammates, Sakic was seen as the leader of the team, acknowledging that the experience changed his outlook on life. Early in his career with the Nordiques (when Mike Hough was still captain), with the team hoping to rebuild around their top draft pick Eric Lindros and holding onto Lindros' rights for the season when he refused to sign, Sakic suggested that the team could progress without Lindros. Lindros was traded a year later, bringing in a number of quality players, which vastly improved the Nordiques. Sakic's leadership qualities led him to be courted by other teams, such as in the summer of 1997, when the New York Rangers offered him a large contract in order to replace departed captain Mark Messier, though the Avalanche ultimately matched the offer and retained Sakic.

One of the most defining actions of Sakic's career was at the conclusion of the 2001 playoffs. Defying the NHL tradition of the captain being the first to skate around with the Stanley Cup, Sakic passed it off to teammate Ray Bourque. Bourque, one of the best defensemen to ever play, had been traded to the Avalanche the year before after spending 21 years with the Boston Bruins and setting the record for most games played without winning the Cup.

When an eye injury forced Steve Yzerman (who normally wore number 19 for Canada) to miss the 2004 World Cup of Hockey, Sakic and Joe Thornton both refused the number out of respect for their injured countryman, even though both players each wore the number 19 for their respective NHL clubs and were now eligible to wear it for Team Canada in Yzerman's absence.

Sakic's leadership qualities and abilities helped carry the Avalanche in the years after their 2001 Stanley Cup, which saw the team lose key players to retirement and free agency, especially after the 2004–05 lock-out.

== Awards ==
=== WHL and CHL ===
| Award | Year |
|---|---|
| WHL East Stewart "Butch" Paul Memorial Trophy (Rookie of the Year) | 1987 |
| WHL East Player of the Year | 1987 |
| WHL East Second All-Star Team | 1987 |
| WHL Bob Clarke Trophy (Leading Scorer) | 1988 |
| CHL Player of the Year | 1988 |
| WHL Player of the Year | 1988 |
| WHL East First All-Star Team | 1988 |

=== NHL ===
| Award | Year(s) |
|---|---|
| Stanley Cup champion (as player) | 1996, 2001 |
| Stanley Cup champion (as executive) | 2022 |
| Conn Smythe Trophy | 1996 |
| M.A.C. (Most Assists with Children) Award | 1998 |
| Bud Light Plus/Minus Award (shared with Patrik Eliáš) | 2001 |
| Hart Memorial Trophy | 2001 |
| Lester B. Pearson Award | 2001 |
| Lady Byng Memorial Trophy | 2001 |
| NHL First All-Star Team | 2001, 2002, 2004 |
| NHL All-Star Game MVP | 2004 |
| NHL/Sheraton Road Performer Award (most road points) | 2004 |
| NHL Foundation Player Award | 2007 |
| NHL 2000s All-Decade First Team | 2009 |
| Jim Gregory General Manager of the Year Award | 2021–22 |

=== International ===
| Award | Year |
|---|---|
| Winter Olympic Games Ice Hockey Tournament Most Valuable Player | 2002 |
| Winter Olympic Games Ice Hockey All-Star Team | 2002 |
| IIHF Hall of Fame | 2017 |

- All awards taken from NHL.com

=== Other ===
- In October 2022, he was inaugurated in the Croatian-American Sports Hall of Fame.

== See also ==
- List of NHL statistical leaders
- List of NHL players with 1000 points
- List of NHL players with 500 goals

Awards and achievements
| Preceded by Rob Brown | CHL Player of the Year; 1988 | Succeeded by Bryan Fogarty |
| Preceded by Bryan Fogarty | Quebec Nordiques first-round draft pick 1987 | Succeeded by Curtis Leschyshyn |
| Preceded by Claude Lemieux | Conn Smythe Trophy winner 1996 | Succeeded by Mike Vernon |
| Preceded by Chris Pronger | Hart Memorial Trophy winner 2001 | Succeeded by José Théodore |
| Preceded by Jaromír Jágr | Lester B. Pearson Award winner 2001 | Succeeded by Jarome Iginla |
| Preceded by Pavol Demitra | Lady Byng Trophy winner 2001 | Succeeded by Ron Francis |
| Preceded by Chris Pronger | NHL Plus/Minus Award winner 2001; With: Patrik Eliáš | Succeeded by Chris Chelios |
Sporting positions
| Preceded by Peter Šťastný; Mike Hough | Quebec Nordiques captain 1990–1991 (with Steven Finn); 1992–1995 | Succeeded by Mike Hough; Franchise relocated to Colorado |
| Preceded by Franchise relocated from Quebec | Colorado Avalanche captain 1995–2009 | Succeeded by Adam Foote |
| Preceded by Greg Sherman; Chris MacFarland | General manager of the Colorado Avalanche; 2014–2022; 2026–present | Succeeded by Chris MacFarland; Incumbent |
