= Brian Sakic =

Canadian ice hockey player (born 1971)

- Born: September 4, 1971 (age 55) Burnaby, British Columbia, Canada
- Height: 5 ft 10 in (178 cm)
- Weight: 179 lb (81 kg; 12 st 11 lb)
- Position: Centre
- Shot: Left
- Played for: Erie Panthers; Flint Generals; Austin Ice Bats
- NHL draft: 93rd overall, 1990; Washington Capitals
- Playing career: 1992–1999

Brian Sakic (born September 4, 1971) is a Canadian former professional ice hockey player.

== Playing career ==
Born in Burnaby, British Columbia, Sakic started his junior career with the Swift Current Broncos of the Western Hockey League (WHL). His brother, Hockey Hall of Famer Joe Sakic, was also on the team. Brian was drafted in the fifth round, 93rd overall in the 1990 NHL entry draft by the Washington Capitals; however, he never played a single game in the NHL. He set WHL records for career assists, with 405, and points, with 591. His jersey number has been retired by the Tri-City Americans.

Sakic retired from professional hockey in 1999.

== Personal life ==
Brian Sakic was accused, along with fellow Swift Current Broncos teammate, Wade Smith, of gang raping a teenage girl with an undisclosed learning disability in 1989. The case never went to trial, but the complainant did end up going on trial for mischief, for which she was acquitted. Sakic and Smith were both traded away from Swift Current and were never charged or tried.

== Career statistics ==
			Regular season					Playoffs
Season	Team	League	GP	G	A	Pts	PIM	GP	G	A	Pts	PIM
1987–88	Swift Current Broncos	WHL	65	12	37	49	12	9	3	8	11	0
1988–89	Swift Current Broncos	WHL	71	36	64	100	28	12	9	9	18	8
1989–90	Swift Current Broncos	WHL	8	6	7	13	4	—	—	—	—	—
1989–90	Tri-City Americans	WHL	58	47	92	139	8	—	—	—	—	—
1990–91	Tri-City Americans	WHL	69	40	122	162	19	5	2	3	5	4
1991–92	Tri-City Americans	WHL	72	45	83	128	55	5	4	4	8	14
1992–93	Erie Panthers	ECHL	51	18	33	51	22	—	—	—	—	—
1993–94	Flint Generals	CoHL	64	39	86	125	30	10	6	7	13	2
1994–95	Flint Generals	CoHL	62	28	85	113	22	6	1	5	6	0
1995–96	Flint Generals	CoHL	74	30	66	96	30	15	8	12	20	0
1996–97	Austin Ice Bats	WPHL	16	2	8	10	23	—	—	—	—	—
1996–97	Flint Generals	CoHL	53	19	47	66	4	13	5	15	20	4
1997–98	Flint Generals	UHL	72	21	99	120	10	3	0	2	2	0
1998–99	Flint Generals	UHL	71	36	72	108	10	12	4	15	19	2
WHL totals			343	186	405	591	126	31	18	24	42	26
CoHL/UHL totals			396	173	455	628	106	59	24	56	80	8

== Awards and honours ==
Award	Year
WHL
West Second All-Star Team	1990
West First All-Star Team	1991
CHL
Memorial Cup (Swift Current Broncos)	1989
