= Ken Sutton =

Canadian ice hockey player

- Born: November 5, 1969 (age 56) Edmonton, Alberta, Canada
- Height: 6 ft 0 in (183 cm)
- Weight: 200 lb (91 kg; 14 st 4 lb)
- Position: Defence
- Shot: Left
- Played for: Buffalo Sabres; Edmonton Oilers; St. Louis Blues; New Jersey Devils; San Jose Sharks; New York Islanders; ERC Ingolstadt
- NHL draft: 98th overall, 1989; Buffalo Sabres
- Playing career: 1989–2006

Kenneth William Sutton (born November 5, 1969) is a Canadian former professional ice hockey player. Sutton played defence in the National Hockey League (NHL) for the Buffalo Sabres, Edmonton Oilers, St. Louis Blues, New Jersey Devils, San Jose Sharks and New York Islanders.

== Playing career ==
=== Junior career ===
Born in Edmonton, Alberta, Ken Sutton played one season for the Saskatoon Blades in 1988–89 helping the team to the Memorial Cup final.

=== Professional career ===
He began his career with the Rochester Americans of the American Hockey League (AHL) where he would play for two seasons before being called up to the Buffalo Sabres in 1991. He stayed with Buffalo until he was traded to the Edmonton Oilers for Scott Pearson on April 7, 1995.

Sutton played parts of two seasons for Edmonton in between stints with the Worcester IceCats. He was traded to the St. Louis Blues along with Igor Kravchuk for Jeff Norton and Donald Dufresne on January 4, 1996. He only played a total of seven games for the Blues spending the rest of the season with the IceCats.

Sutton was traded to the New Jersey Devils with St. Louis' second-round choice (Brett Clouthier) in the 1999 NHL entry draft for Mike Peluso and Ricard Persson on November 26, 1996. Sutton would spend the entire 1997 in the minors between the Manitoba Moose of the International Hockey League (IHL) and the AHL's Albany River Rats.

Sutton played 13 games for New Jersey in the 1997–98 season before being traded to the San Jose Sharks with John MacLean for Doug Bodger and Dody Wood on December 7, 1997. He only played eight games for San Jose before being sent back to New Jersey on August 26, 1998 for future considerations. Sutton played the next season for the Albany River Rats. Sutton was claimed by the Washington Capitals in the Waiver Draft on September 27, 1999 before being sent back to New Jersey for future considerations on October 5. Sutton again played the majority of the season in Albany before being called up to the Devils for the playoffs. He would help New Jersey win the Stanley Cup in 2000. Sutton's name was included on the Stanley Cup in 2000 even though he did not qualify as he had played only six regular season games, and did not dress in the playoffs. Sutton played the next season for the Devils, this time playing in the 2001 Stanley Cup Final where the Devils lost to the Colorado Avalanche in seven games.

Sutton signed as a free agent with the New York Islanders on July 5, 2001. He split the 2001–02 season between the NHL and the Bridgeport Sound Tigers of the AHL. Sutton went back to the Devils for the 2002–03 season playing the whole year for the Albany River Rats. After 2003, he left the NHL and went to play in Europe.

=== Europe ===
From 2003–2006, Sutton played for ERC Ingolstadt of the DEL.

== Awards and achievements ==
- 1999 Eddie Shore Award (AHL Best Defenceman)

== Career statistics ==
			Regular season					Playoffs
Season	Team	League	GP	G	A	Pts	PIM	GP	G	A	Pts	PIM
1987–88	Calgary Canucks	AJHL	53	13	43	56	226	—	—	—	—	—
1988–89	Saskatoon Blades	WHL	71	22	31	53	104	8	2	5	7	12
1988–89	Saskatoon Blades	MC	—	—	—	—	—	4	3	2	5	6
1989–90	Rochester Americans	AHL	57	5	14	19	83	11	1	6	7	15
1990–91	Buffalo Sabres	NHL	15	3	6	9	13	6	0	1	1	2
1990–91	Rochester Americans	AHL	62	7	24	31	65	3	1	1	2	14
1991–92	Buffalo Sabres	NHL	64	2	18	20	71	7	0	2	2	4
1992–93	Buffalo Sabres	NHL	63	8	14	22	30	8	3	1	4	8
1993–94	Buffalo Sabres	NHL	78	4	20	24	71	4	0	0	0	2
1994–95	Buffalo Sabres	NHL	12	1	2	3	30	—	—	—	—	—
1994–95	Edmonton Oilers	NHL	12	3	1	4	12	—	—	—	—	—
1995–96	Edmonton Oilers	NHL	32	0	8	8	39	—	—	—	—	—
1995–96	St. Louis Blues	NHL	6	0	0	0	4	1	0	0	0	0
1995–96	Worcester IceCats	AHL	32	4	16	20	60	4	0	2	2	21
1996–97	Manitoba Moose	IHL	20	3	10	13	48	—	—	—	—	—
1996–97	Albany River Rats	AHL	61	6	13	19	79	16	4	8	12	55
1997–98	New Jersey Devils	NHL	13	0	0	0	6	—	—	—	—	—
1997–98	Albany River Rats	AHL	10	0	7	7	15	—	—	—	—	—
1997–98	San Jose Sharks	NHL	8	0	0	0	15	—	—	—	—	—
1998–99	New Jersey Devils	NHL	5	1	0	1	0	—	—	—	—	—
1998–99	Albany River Rats	AHL	75	13	42	55	118	5	0	2	2	12
1999–2000	New Jersey Devils	NHL	6	0	2	2	2	—	—	—	—	—
1999–2000	Albany River Rats	AHL	57	5	16	21	129	—	—	—	—	—
2000–01	New Jersey Devils	NHL	53	1	7	8	37	6	0	0	0	13
2001–02	New York Islanders	NHL	21	0	2	2	8	—	—	—	—	—
2001–02	Bridgeport Sound Tigers	AHL	28	1	10	11	51	20	2	8	10	24
2002–03	Albany River Rats	AHL	74	6	26	32	70	—	—	—	—	—
2003–04	ERC Ingolstadt	DEL	47	3	13	16	157	3	0	0	0	25
2004–05	ERC Ingolstadt	DEL	51	7	19	26	80	11	2	4	6	34
2005–06	ERC Ingolstadt	DEL	49	4	22	26	112	7	0	4	4	8
2007–08	Dundas Real McCoys	MLH	1	0	0	0	0	—	—	—	—	—
AHL totals			456	47	168	215	670	59	8	27	35	141
NHL totals			388	23	80	103	338	32	3	4	7	29
DEL totals			147	14	54	68	349	21	2	8	10	67
