= Tracey Katelnikoff =

Canadian ice hockey player

- Born: July 17, 1968 (age 57) Calgary, Alberta, Canada
- Height: 5 ft 9 in (175 cm)
- Weight: 175 lb (79 kg; 12 st 7 lb)
- Position: Left wing
- Shot: Left
- Played for: DEL; SC Riessersee; WPHL; Lake Charles Ice Pirates
- NHL draft: Undrafted
- Playing career: 1995–2000

Tracey Katelnikoff (born July 17, 1968) is a Canadian former professional ice hockey player.

Katelnikoff played four seasons (1985 to 1989) of major junior hockey in the Western Hockey League, scoring 156 goals and 149 assists for 305 points, while earning 280 penalty minutes, in 267 games played. He then attended the University of Calgary where he was named to the Canada West Second All-Star team in three consecutive seasons (1993 to 1995) before commencing his professional career in Europe.

Katelnikoff made his Deutsche Eishockey Liga debut with SC Riessersee during the 1995-96 season, but played the majority of his European games in Germany's 2nd Bundesliga. Returning to North America, he spent the 1999-2000 season in the Western Professional Hockey League with the Lake Charles Ice Pirates before retiring as a professional player.

Katelnikoff, who is currently the owner of the Calgary-based Endurance Oilfield Supply Inc., continues to play senior hockey in the Western Hockey Oilmens Association.

Katelnikoff also coaches elite level minor hockey with the HSL U14 Prep Hurricanes.
