= Swift Current Broncos bus crash =

1986 road incident in Saskatchewan, Canada

Details
- Date: December 30, 1986; 15:45 (CST)
- Location: Saskatchewan Highway 1 (Trans-Canada Highway), Swift Current No. 137, Saskatchewan
- Cause: Black ice on road

Statistics
- Bus: Western Flyer D600 motorcoach
- Passengers: 28
- Deaths: 4

The Swift Current Broncos bus crash occurred in December 1986, killing four members of the Swift Current Broncos ice hockey team.

== Accident ==
On December 30, 1986, the Broncos' bus, a mid-1960s Western Flyer D600 Canuck, left the Centennial Civic Centre in the 3:00 PM hour, bound for Regina. The team was on its way to play the Regina Pats. Shortly after entering eastbound Saskatchewan Highway 1 (the Trans-Canada Highway), the bus, travelling at a speed of 53 km/h (33 mph), hit a patch of black ice in the eastbound lanes of Highway 1 as the road curved to the right over the Canadian Pacific main line. It then slid off the overpass and hit an embankment on a nearby access road, causing the bus to go airborne, and then flipped on its side sliding about 100 metres before coming to rest in a ditch. Many players were able to extricate themselves from the wreck before first responders arrived, giving first aid and attempting to identify where individuals had landed and what their injuries were.

Four players who were sitting at the very rear of the coach, Trent Kresse, Scott Kruger, Chris Mantyka, and Brent Ruff (younger brother of then-Buffalo Sabres captain Lindy Ruff), were killed; Mantyka and Ruff were crushed by the rear of the bus and Kresse and Kruger were catapulted from it. Eyewitness Leesa Culp was the first person to arrive at Kreese and Kruger's sides after the accident to see if any aid could be given.

== Aftermath ==
Following the incident, the four players' jersey numbers were retired by the team. The Broncos still wear a commemorative patch in remembrance of the four players to this day. The rest of the team, led by future NHL star Joe Sakic, who recorded 60 goals, played out the season despite the loss. Future NHLer Sheldon Kennedy was also a member of the team. Shortly after the accident there was confusion between Trent Kresse and recently traded Trent Kaese, who shared the same jersey number, leading many to offer condolences to Trent Kaese's family.

Years later, following the 2018 Humboldt Broncos crash, Kennedy recalled the silence after the accident claiming: "Everything was in slow motion. It was eerily deaf. There was just no sound at all. I remember us standing in the snow, in stocking feet, in shock..." Kennedy has become involved in raising awareness across Canada for children and young adults experiencing trauma and/or abuse, after recognizing the trauma from the accident.

Multiple survivors and their families allege that then coach Graham James would not let mental health and other based individuals help the players after the crash, due to James` fear of his history of sexual abuse being exposed. Bob Wilkie claimed: "We weren't allowed to talk about it....My mom wondered for years why we were never given any of the resources we need to cope properly. Those who wanted to help were told 'no' by Graham. Now we know why." However, while professional help was out of the question, player Dan Lambert stated that the entire team banded together and created a support network to deal with the questions, doubts, guilt, and other thoughts.

== Memorials ==
After the accident the team and town created a large memorial at the rink, and teams from across the Western Hockey League came to pay their respects along with family, friends and residents of Swift Current.

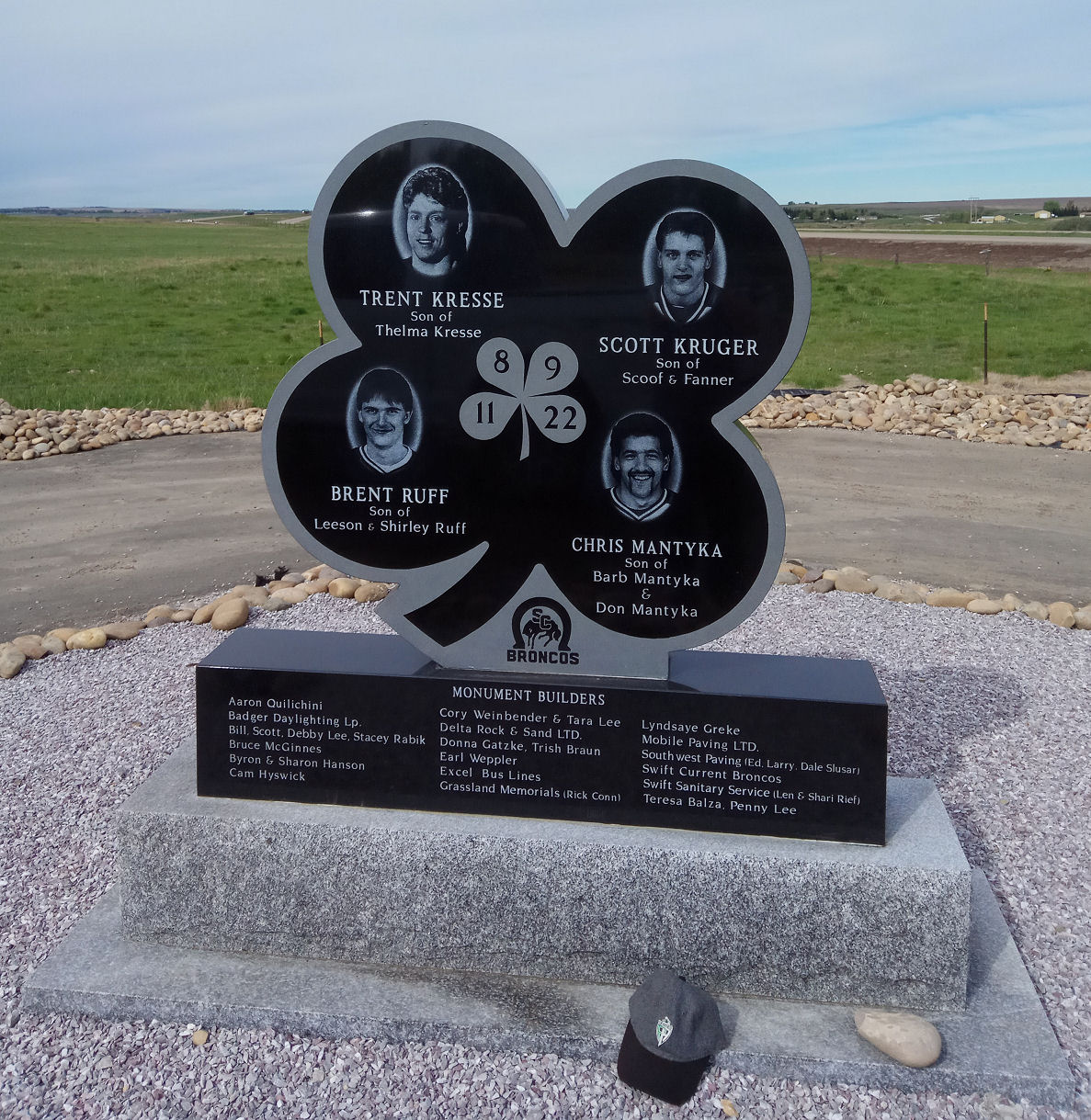
Four Broncos memorial

A memorial for the four killed in the accident was mounted on the back wall of the Swift Current Broncos arena, on the 20th anniversary, with photos of the deceased and hockey sweaters bearing the players numbers, encased in glass.

During the game that would become known as the Punch-up in Piestany, a moment of silence was held for the players who were killed at the start of the second, and ultimately final, period.

On the 30th anniversary of the crash, December 30, 2016, a memorial was unveiled near the site of the accident. The memorial is a two-metre granite structure in the shape of a four-leaf clover, with each player featured in one segment of the clover. The memorial is accessible travelling eastbound on Hwy 1, about four kilometres east of Swift Current, and when viewing the memorial, the raised overpass over the CP Rail Line can be clearly seen.

In a move to memorialize the fallen players, the WHL awards the Four Broncos Memorial Trophy to the league's Player of the Year.

== In popular culture ==
In 2013, Trilight Entertainment secured the rights to produce a feature film adaptation of the book Sudden Death: The Incredible Saga of the 1986 Swift Current Broncos. The book is written in collaboration of three individuals who are connected to the incident; defenseman Bob Wilkie, WHL Historian Gregg Drinnan, and witness to the crash Leesa Culp.

== Reaction to other crashes ==
=== Bathurst, N.B. Phantoms Basketball ===
After the crash, a survivor of the Swift Current crash, Joe Sakic, weighed in on how the crashes were similar and how the town would possibly overcome the accident.

=== Humboldt Broncos crash ===
Shortly after the 2018 crash involving the Humboldt Broncos, surviving members of the team flew to Saskatoon to meet with injured players and their families. Sheldon Kennedy offered his thoughts on the grieving process that all those involved should talk about the tragedy and the feelings that it invokes, as the collective trauma is far-reaching and residual.

== See also ==
- List of accidents involving sports teams
- Humboldt Broncos bus crash
