= Kimbi Daniels =

Canadian ice hockey player

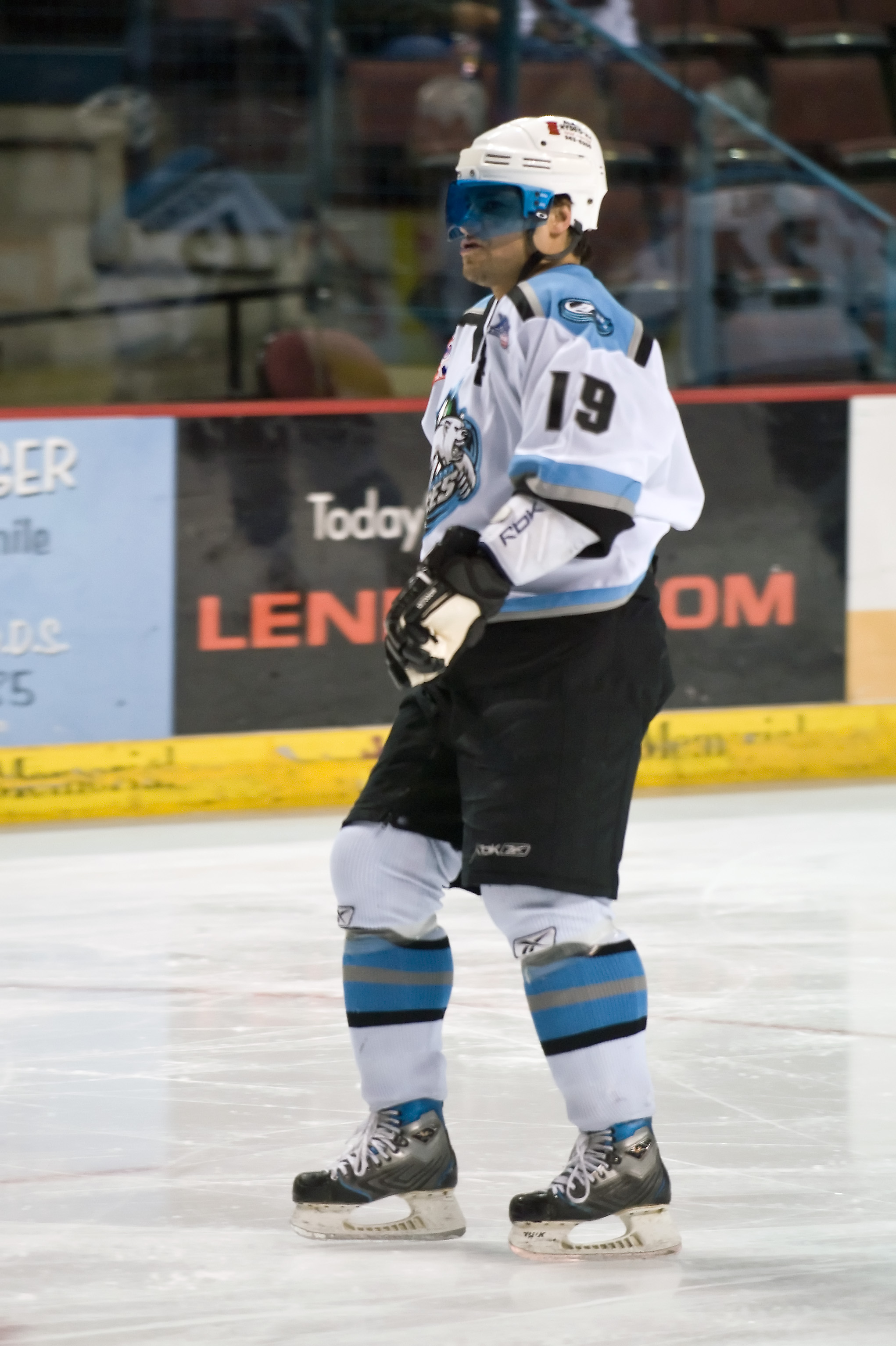
- Born: Estevan, Saskatchewan, Canada
- Height: 5 ft 11 in (180 cm)
- Weight: 185 lb (84 kg; 13 st 3 lb)
- Position: Centre
- Shot: Right
- Played for: Philadelphia Flyers
- NHL draft: 44th overall, 1990; Philadelphia Flyers
- Playing career: 1991–2009

Kimball J. Daniels is a Canadian former professional ice hockey player who played parts of two seasons in the National Hockey League (NHL) for the Philadelphia Flyers.

== Playing Career ==
Daniels's career started with the Swift Current Broncos of the WHL, where he racked up at least 50 points in each of his three seasons. On October 2, 1990, against the Medicine Hat Tigers, Daniels scored all 7 goals in a 7-4 win that still stands as a WHL record for goals in a game by one player. He then had two brief stints with the Philadelphia Flyers of the NHL, before an injury to his knee and leg forced him to return to the WHL, where he would have 21-point seasons for the Seattle Thunderbirds and the Tri-City Americans. After stints in the IHL and AHL, Daniels started to see improvement in the ECHL, a league that was less than ten years old when he started play in the 95–96 season with the Jacksonville Lizard Kings. He topped 30 points that year, and he would get close to that mark over the next three years with the Charlotte Checkers and the Wheeling Nailers.

After some time in the IHL and AHL, Daniels's return to the ECHL with the New Orleans Brass and the Tallahassee Tiger Sharks would once again give him a slight improvement in stats. He was then shipped to the Anchorage Aces of the WCHL, where his stats took a huge spike with three seasons of 89 points, 62 points, and 63 points respectively. The WCHL then folded operations, which forced the Aces to merge into the ECHL and become the Alaska Aces. Despite Daniels drop in stats as a result of the change, the Aces won the Kelly Cup championship for the 05–06 season. Daniels led the Aces team in scoring with 81 points and volleyed between the top three scoring spots for the entire ECHL league in 06–07. He also notched his 400th point as an Ace.

On September 16, 2008, Daniels moved from the Alaska Aces to the Phoenix RoadRunners.

== Personal life ==
Daniels was born in Estevan, Saskatchewan, but grew up in Brandon, Manitoba. He has three children, Kaden, Claire and Kellen. He resides in Anchorage, AK with his wife Colleen and kids.

== Career statistics ==
			Regular season					Playoffs
Season	Team	League	GP	G	A	Pts	PIM	GP	G	A	Pts	PIM
1987–88	Kildonan North Stars	MJHL	18	5	11	16	28
1988–89	Swift Current Broncos	WHL	68	30	31	61	48	12	6	6	12	12
1989–90	Swift Current Broncos	WHL	69	43	51	94	84	4	1	3	4	10
1990–91	Swift Current Broncos	WHL	69	64	64	128	68	3	4	2	6	6
1990–91	Philadelphia Flyers	NHL	2	0	1	1	0	—	—	—	—	—
1991–92	Seattle Thunderbirds	WHL	19	7	14	21	133	15	5	10	15	27
1991–92	Philadelphia Flyers	NHL	25	1	1	2	4	—	—	—	—	—
1992–93	Tri-City Americans	WHL	9	9	12	21	12	3	0	1	1	8
1993–94	Detroit Falcons	CoHL	23	11	28	39	42	—	—	—	—	—
1993–94	Salt Lake Golden Eagles	IHL	25	6	19	25	108	—	—	—	—	—
1994–95	Minnesota Moose	IHL	10	1	4	5	2	—	—	—	—	—
1995–96	Baltimore Bandits	AHL	7	2	1	3	25	—	—	—	—	—
1995–96	Jacksonville Lizard Kings	ECHL	26	12	22	34	129	—	—	—	—	—
1995–96	Charlotte Checkers	ECHL	18	16	14	30	6	16	8	6	14	24
1996–97	Charlotte Checkers	ECHL	32	12	24	36	116	—	—	—	—	—
1996–97	Wheeling Nailers	ECHL	17	5	24	29	10	3	1	4	5	6
1996–97	Rochester Americans	AHL	6	1	3	4	2	—	—	—	—	—
1996–97	Hamilton Bulldogs	AHL	3	0	0	0	0	16	8	8	16	4
1997–98	San Antonio Dragons	IHL	13	2	12	14	20	—	—	—	—	—
1997–98	Quebec Rafales	IHL	28	17	9	26	69	—	—	—	—	—
1997–98	Providence Bruins	AHL	32	12	15	27	130	—	—	—	—	—
1998–99	New Orleans Brass	ECHL	29	11	28	39	61	—	—	—	—	—
1999–00	Tallahassee Tiger Sharks	ECHL	34	11	12	23	38	—	—	—	—	—
1999–00	Quebec Citadelles	AHL	25	6	4	10	44	—	—	—	—	—
2000–01	Anchorage Aces	WCHL	66	36	53	89	182	3	0	1	1	0
2001–02	Anchorage Aces	WCHL	64	29	33	62	161	4	0	2	2	28
2002–03	Anchorage Aces	WCHL	72	23	40	63	91	—	—	—	—	—
2003–04	Alaska Aces	ECHL	70	19	42	61	113	7	2	2	4	8
2004–05	Alaska Aces	ECHL	40	8	10	18	73	11	4	6	10	20
2005–06	Alaska Aces	ECHL	33	14	19	33	30	22	5	15	20	30
2006–07	Alaska Aces	ECHL	70	18	63	81	128	15	3	10	13	16
2007–08	Alaska Aces	ECHL	71	25	41	66	134	9	2	7	9	16
2008–09	Phoenix RoadRunners	ECHL	60	20	36	56	42	—	—	—	—	—
NHL totals			27	1	2	3	4	—	—	—	—	—
