= Ville Heponiemi =

Finnish ice hockey player

- Born: September 12, 1995 (age 29); Tampere, Finland
- Height: 5 ft 11 in (180 cm)
- Weight: 170 lb (77 kg; 12 st 2 lb)
- Position: Forward
- Shoots: Left
- Liiga team: Ilves
- NHL draft: Undrafted
- Playing career: 2015–present

Ville Heponiemi (born September 12, 1995) is a Finnish professional ice hockey player. He is currently playing for Ilves of the Finnish Liiga.

Heponiemi made his Liiga debut playing with Ilves during the 2014–15 Liiga season.
