= Terry McDonald (ice hockey) =

Canadian former ice hockey defenceman (born 1955)

- Born: June 17, 1955 (age 70) Coquitlam, British Columbia, Canada
- Height: 6 ft 1 in (185 cm)
- Weight: 180 lb (82 kg; 12 st 12 lb)
- Position: Defence
- Shot: Left
- Played for: Kansas City Scouts
- NHL draft: 74th overall, 1975; Kansas City Scouts
- Playing career: 1975–1979

Terry Grant McDonald (born June 17, 1955) is a Canadian former ice hockey defenceman.

== Early life ==
Born in Coquitlam, British Columbia, McDonald played junior hockey with the Vancouver Villas and Kamloops Chiefs.

== Career ==
McDonald was drafted 74th overall by the Kansas City Scouts in the 1975 NHL Amateur Draft and played eight games for the Scouts in the 1975–76 season, scoring one assist and accumulating six penalty minutes. The rest of his career was spent in the minor leagues, and he retired in 1979.

== Career statistics ==
=== Regular season and playoffs ===
			Regular season					Playoffs
Season	Team	League	GP	G	A	Pts	PIM	GP	G	A	Pts	PIM
1971–72	Coquitlam Comets	BCJHL	—	—	—	—	—	—	—	—	—	—
1972–73	Vancouver Nats	WCHL	49	9	18	27	81	—	—	—	—	—
1973–74	Kamloops Chiefs	WCHL	68	10	22	32	102	—	—	—	—	—
1974–75	Kamloops Chiefs	WCHL	66	32	37	69	89	6	3	1	4	2
1975–76	Kansas City Scouts	NHL	8	0	1	1	6	—	—	—	—	—
1975–76	Springfield Indians	AHL	24	0	0	0	13	—	—	—	—	—
1975–76	Port Huron Flags	IHL	43	6	25	31	75	15	5	2	7	23
1976–77	Rhode Island Reds	AHL	76	20	18	38	18	—	—	—	—	—
1976–77	Flint Generals	IHL	2	0	0	0	0	—	—	—	—	—
1977–78	Phoenix Roadrunners	CHL	27	12	10	22	11	—	—	—	—	—
1977–78	Flint Generals	IHL	42	19	32	51	29	5	3	0	3	0
1978–79	Phoenix Roadrunners	PHL	60	26	31	57	20	—	—	—	—	—
NHL totals			8	0	1	1	6	—	—	—	—	—

Preceded by Tim Young	New England Whalers first-round draft pick 1975	Succeeded by Ray Allison
