= Barry Smith (ice hockey, born 1955) =

Canadian ice hockey player

- Born: April 25, 1955; Surrey, British Columbia, Canada
- Died: September 7, 2013 (aged 58); Blaine, Tennessee, U.S.
- Height: 5 ft 11 in (180 cm)
- Weight: 178 lb (81 kg; 12 st 10 lb)
- Position: Centre
- Shot: Left
- Played for: Boston Bruins; Colorado Rockies; Rochester Americans
- NHL draft: 32nd overall, 1975; Boston Bruins
- WHA draft: 36th overall, 1975; Edmonton Oilers
- Playing career: 1975–1981

Barry Edward Smith (April 25, 1955 – September 7, 2013) was a Canadian NHL player for the Boston Bruins and the Colorado Rockies.

== Career ==
Smith was drafted 32nd overall by the Boston Bruins in the 1975 NHL Amateur Draft. He played a total of 114 regular season games, scoring seven goals and seven assists for 14 points. He was also drafted 36th overall by Edmonton Oilers in the 1975 WHA Amateur Draft but never played in that league.

After retiring from playing, he became a coach in the ECHL for the Knoxville Cherokees for five seasons between 1992 and 1997. He was replaced midseason in his fifth season by Jack Capuano. He coached again from 2000 to 2001, helming the San Angelo Outlaws of the WPHL in their final season before the league folded. Smith died in September 2013 at the age of 58.

== Career statistics ==
=== Regular season and playoffs ===
			Regular season					Playoffs
Season	Team	League	GP	G	A	Pts	PIM	GP	G	A	Pts	PIM
1969–70	Estevan Bruins	WCHL	2	0	0	0	2	—	—	—	—	—
1970–71	Estevan Bruins	WCHL	62	6	13	19	96	7	3	3	6	10
1971–72	New Westminster Bruins	WCHL	9	4	2	6	10	—	—	—	—	—
1971–72	Vancouver Nats	WCHL	41	9	15	24	39	—	—	—	—	—
1972–73	Vancouver Nats	WCHL	30	5	6	11	13	—	—	—	—	—
1972–73	New Westminster Bruins	WCHL	32	5	6	11	46	5	0	0	0	0
1973–74	New Westminster Bruins	WCHL	65	8	10	18	61	11	2	1	3	12
1974–75	New Westminster Bruins	WCHL	65	19	24	43	50	18	7	6	13	14
1974–75	New Westminster Bruins	M-Cup	—	—	—	—	—	3	1	2	3	0
1975–76	Boston Bruins	NHL	19	1	0	1	2	—	—	—	—	—
1975–76	Rochester Americans	AHL	50	14	22	36	14	7	4	4	8	5
1976–77	Rochester Americans	AHL	79	9	13	22	16	12	3	2	5	4
1977–78	Rochester Americans	AHL	81	16	16	32	22	6	2	1	3	0
1978–79	Rochester Americans	AHL	80	23	43	66	46	—	—	—	—	—
1979–80	Colorado Rockies	NHL	33	2	3	5	4	—	—	—	—	—
1979–80	Rochester Americans	AHL	35	3	7	10	14	—	—	—	—	—
1979–80	Birmingham Bulls	CHL	13	2	0	2	43	4	1	1	2	0
1980–81	Colorado Rockies	NHL	62	4	4	8	4	—	—	—	—	—
1980–81	Fort Worth Texans	CHL	14	2	5	7	14	—	—	—	—	—
1967–68	Port Huron Flags	IHL	37	11	26	37	25	—	—	—	—	—
AHL totals			325	65	101	166	112	25	9	7	16	9
NHL totals			114	7	7	14	10	—	—	—	—	—

=== International ===
Year	Team	Event	GP	G	A	Pts	PIM
1975	Canada	WJC	5	1	2	3	2
Junior totals			5	1	2	3	2
