= Mike Wanchuk =

Canadian ice hockey player (born 1954)

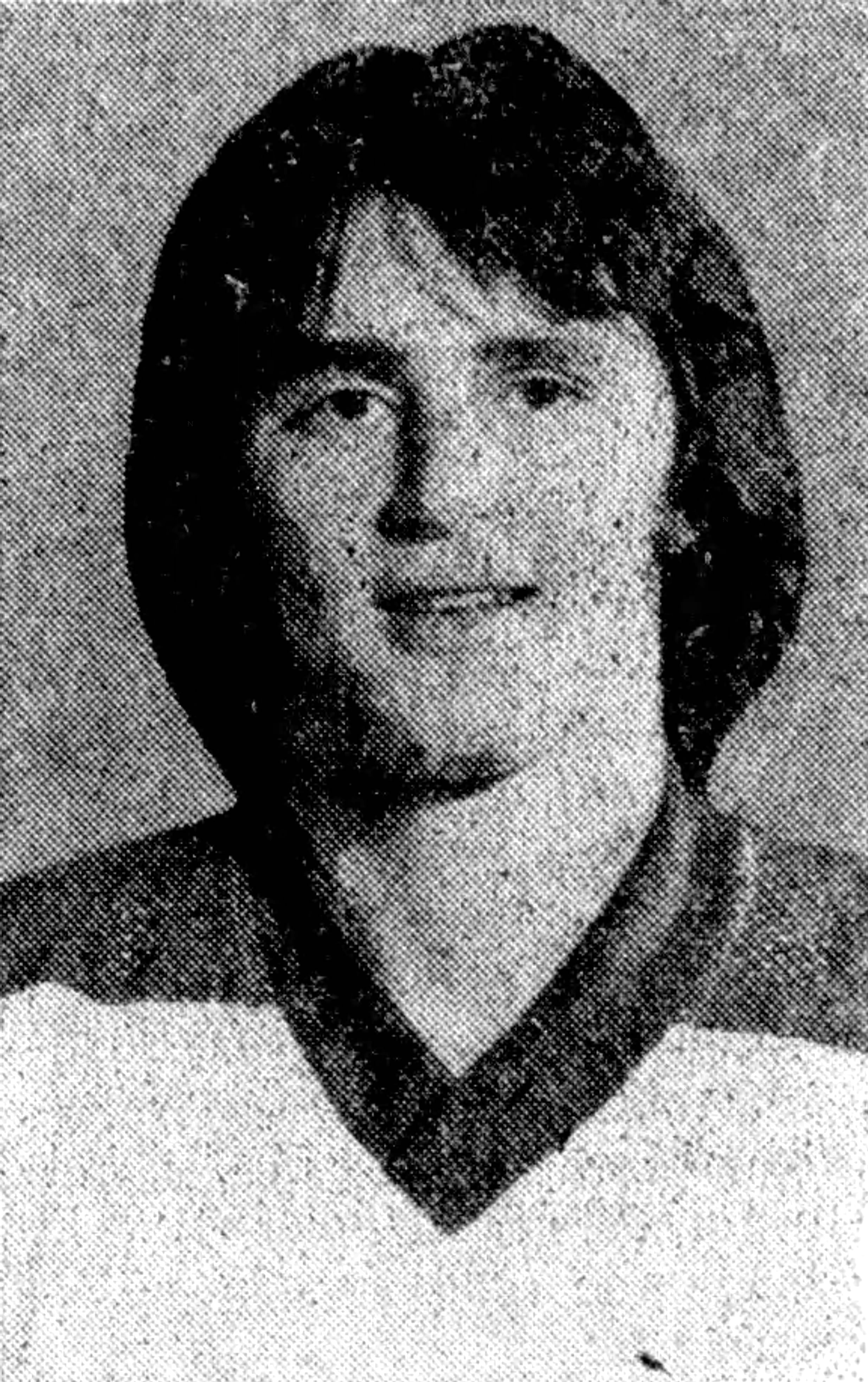
- Wanchuk in 1977
- Born: October 10, 1954 (age 71) St. Paul, Alberta, Canada
- Height: 5 ft 9 in (175 cm)
- Weight: 161 lb (73 kg; 11 st 7 lb)
- Position: Right wing
- Shot: Right
- Played for: Kalamazoo Wings
- Playing career: 1974–1980

Michael Wanchuk (born October 10, 1954) is a Canadian former professional ice hockey player who played right wing. He spent his entire professional career with the Kalamazoo Wings of the International Hockey League (IHL) from 1974 to 1980.

== Playing career ==
Wanchuk played major junior hockey with the Regina Pats of the Western Canada Hockey League (WCHL), recording 258 points in 181 games between 1971 and 1974. In his final season with the team, they won the WCHL and went on to win the 1974 Memorial Cup.

At the start of his professional career, he went to the Montreal Canadiens training camp before joining the Kalamazoo Wings for the franchise’s inaugural IHL season in 1974–75. In his rookie season, Wanchuk became the team's star player, scoring 45 goals and 81 points in 71 games despite breaking his leg late in the season. He was also named the most valuable player of the 1975 IHL All-Star Game.

In the 1975–76 season Wanchuk scored 53 goals, sharing the league lead with Len Fontaine, and 91 points, the third result in the league. He was also selected for the second All-Star Team.

In the 1976–77 season he scored 47 goals and 97 points and earned a first All-Star Team selection. He also scored four goals, including the game winner, against the reigning Soviet champion HC Spartak Moscow to lead the Kalamazoo Wings to a 7–6 victory.

Wanchuk remained with Kalamazoo for six seasons. He scored a total of 239 goals for the team, a franchise record at the time.

Wanchuk helped the Wings win back-to-back Turner Cup championships and retired from professional hockey following the club’s second championship.

Wanchuk was the first player in Kalamazoo Wings history to have his number (22) retired.

== Draft ==
Wanchuk was selected by the Winnipeg Jets in the 1974 WHA Amateur Draft (10th round, 139th overall).

== Career statistics ==
=== Regular season and playoffs ===
Season	Team	League	GP	G	A	Pts	PIM	GP (PO)	G (PO)	A (PO)	Pts (PO)	PIM (PO)
1973–74	Regina Pats	WCHL	64	44	38	82	40	18	15	9	24	18
1972–73	Regina Pats	WCHL	68	36	58	94	18	4	2	1	3	7
1973–74	Regina Pats	WCHL	49	42	40	82	17	16	0	7	7	2
1974–75	Kalamazoo Wings	IHL	71	45	36	81	12	—	—	—	—	—
1975–76	Kalamazoo Wings	IHL	78	53	38	91	12	6	0	3	3	0
1976–77	Kalamazoo Wings	IHL	76	47	50	97	24	10	5	8	13	6
1977–78	Kalamazoo Wings	IHL	80	45	47	92	19	10	9	5	14	4
1978–79	Kalamazoo Wings	IHL	77	24	35	59	11	15	13	10	23	2
1979–80	Kalamazoo Wings	IHL	52	25	22	47	4	16	4	2	6	0
