= Rick Lapointe =

Canadian ice hockey player (1955–1999)

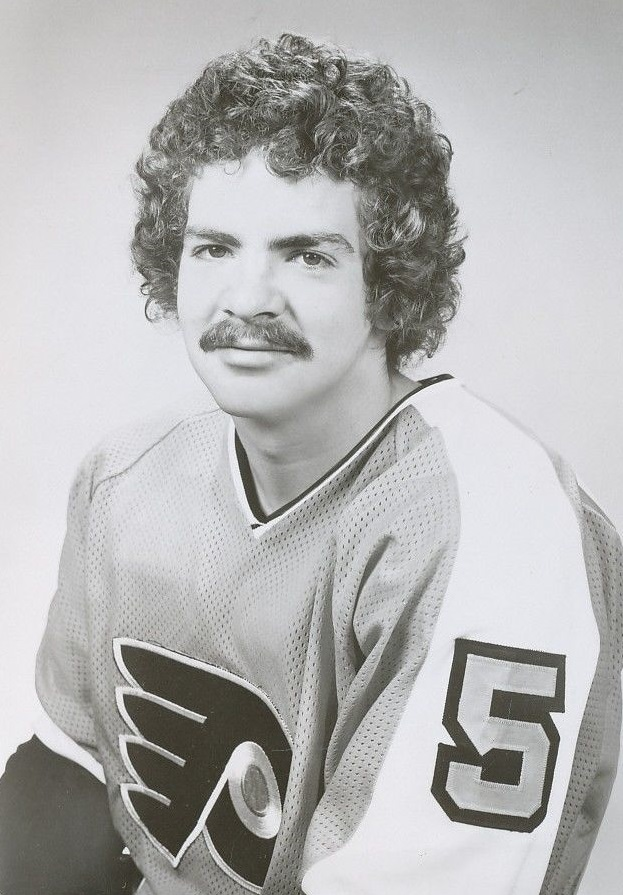
- Lapointe in 1977
- Born: August 2, 1955 Victoria, British Columbia, Canada
- Died: October 17, 1999 (aged 44) Victoria, British Columbia, Canada
- Height: 6 ft 2 in (188 cm)
- Weight: 200 lb (91 kg; 14 st 4 lb)
- Position: Defence
- Shot: Left
- Played for: Detroit Red Wings; Philadelphia Flyers; St. Louis Blues; Quebec Nordiques; Los Angeles Kings
- NHL draft: 5th overall, 1975; Detroit Red Wings
- WHA draft: 11th overall, 1975; Toronto Toros
- Playing career: 1975–1986

Richard Paul "Jumbo" Lapointe (August 2, 1955 – October 17, 1999) was a Canadian professional ice hockey defenceman who played eleven seasons in the National Hockey League (NHL) for the Detroit Red Wings, Philadelphia Flyers, St. Louis Blues, Quebec Nordiques and Los Angeles Kings.

LaPointe married his high school sweetheart Rhonda and had three children. He died in 1999 of a heart attack. In his honour, there is an annual Bantam Triple-A Showcase tournament in Victoria, British Columbia.

== Career statistics ==
=== Regular season and playoffs ===
			Regular season					Playoffs
Season	Team	League	GP	G	A	Pts	PIM	GP	G	A	Pts	PIM
1971–72	Victoria Cougars	WCHL	4	0	0	0	0	—	—	—	—	—
1972–73	Victoria Cougars	WCHL	39	3	12	15	21	—	—	—	—	—
1973–74	Victoria Cougars	WCHL	66	8	18	26	207	—	—	—	—	—
1974–75	Victoria Cougars	WCHL	67	19	51	70	177	12	1	12	13	26
1975–76	Detroit Red Wings	NHL	80	10	23	33	95	—	—	—	—	—
1976–77	Kansas City Blues	CHL	6	0	0	0	6	—	—	—	—	—
1976–77	Detroit Red Wings	NHL	49	2	11	13	80	—	—	—	—	—
1976–77	Philadelphia Flyers	NHL	22	1	8	9	39	10	0	0	0	7
1977–78	Philadelphia Flyers	NHL	47	4	16	20	91	12	0	3	3	19
1978–79	Philadelphia Flyers	NHL	77	3	18	21	53	7	0	1	1	14
1979–80	St. Louis Blues	NHL	80	6	19	25	87	3	0	1	1	6
1980–81	St. Louis Blues	NHL	80	8	25	33	124	8	2	2	4	12
1981–82	St. Louis Blues	NHL	71	2	20	22	127	3	0	0	0	6
1982–83	Quebec Nordiques	NHL	43	2	9	11	59	—	—	—	—	—
1982–83	Fredericton Express	AHL	31	4	14	18	50	12	0	6	6	8
1983–84	Quebec Nordiques	NHL	22	2	10	12	12	3	0	0	0	0
1983–84	Fredericton Express	AHL	54	8	22	30	79	—	—	—	—	—
1984–85	Los Angeles Kings	NHL	73	4	13	17	46	—	—	—	—	—
1985–86	Los Angeles Kings	NHL	20	0	4	4	18	—	—	—	—	—
NHL totals			664	44	176	220	831	46	2	7	9	64

=== International ===
Year	Team	Event	GP	G	A	Pts	PIM
1975	Canada	WJC	5	2	3	5	17

== Awards ==
- WCHL All-Star Team – 1975

Preceded by Bill Lochead	Detroit Red Wings first-round draft pick 1975	Succeeded by Fred Williams
Preceded by Jim Turkiewicz	Toronto Toros first round draft pick 1975	Succeeded by Kent Nilsson
