= Jamie Gallimore =

Canadian ice hockey player

- Born: November 28, 1957 (age 67); Edmonton, Alberta, Canada
- Height: 6 ft 0 in (183 cm)
- Weight: 180 lb (82 kg; 12 st 12 lb)
- Position: Left wing
- Shot: Left
- Played for: Minnesota North Stars
- NHL draft: 97th overall, 1977; Minnesota North Stars
- Playing career: 1977–1982

James Wilfred Gallimore (born November 28, 1957) is a Canadian retired ice hockey player who played two games in the National Hockey League for the Minnesota North Stars during the 1977–78 season.

== Career statistics ==
=== Regular season and playoffs ===
			Regular season					Playoffs
Season	Team	League	GP	G	A	Pts	PIM	GP	G	A	Pts	PIM
1974–75	Kamloops Chiefs	WCHL	56	3	5	8	50	3	0	1	1	27
1975–76	Kamloops Chiefs	WCHL	28	5	7	12	57	1	0	0	0	0
1976–77	Kamloops Chiefs	WCHL	72	24	22	46	121	5	1	1	2	2
1977–78	Fort Wayne Komets	IHL	23	6	6	12	21	—	—	—	—	—
1977–78	Fort Worth Texans	CHL	47	8	2	10	24	9	0	0	0	29
1977–78	Minnesota North Stars	NHL	2	0	0	0	0	—	—	—	—	—
1978–79	Oklahoma City Stars	CHL	38	8	6	14	26	—	—	—	—	—
1979–80	Oklahoma City Stars	CHL	67	5	8	13	35	—	—	—	—	—
1981–82	Wichita Wind	CHL	3	0	1	1	11	—	—	—	—	—
CHL totals			155	21	17	38	96	9	0	0	0	29
NHL totals			2	0	0	0	0	—	—	—	—	—
