= Gary Donaldson =

Canadian ice hockey player

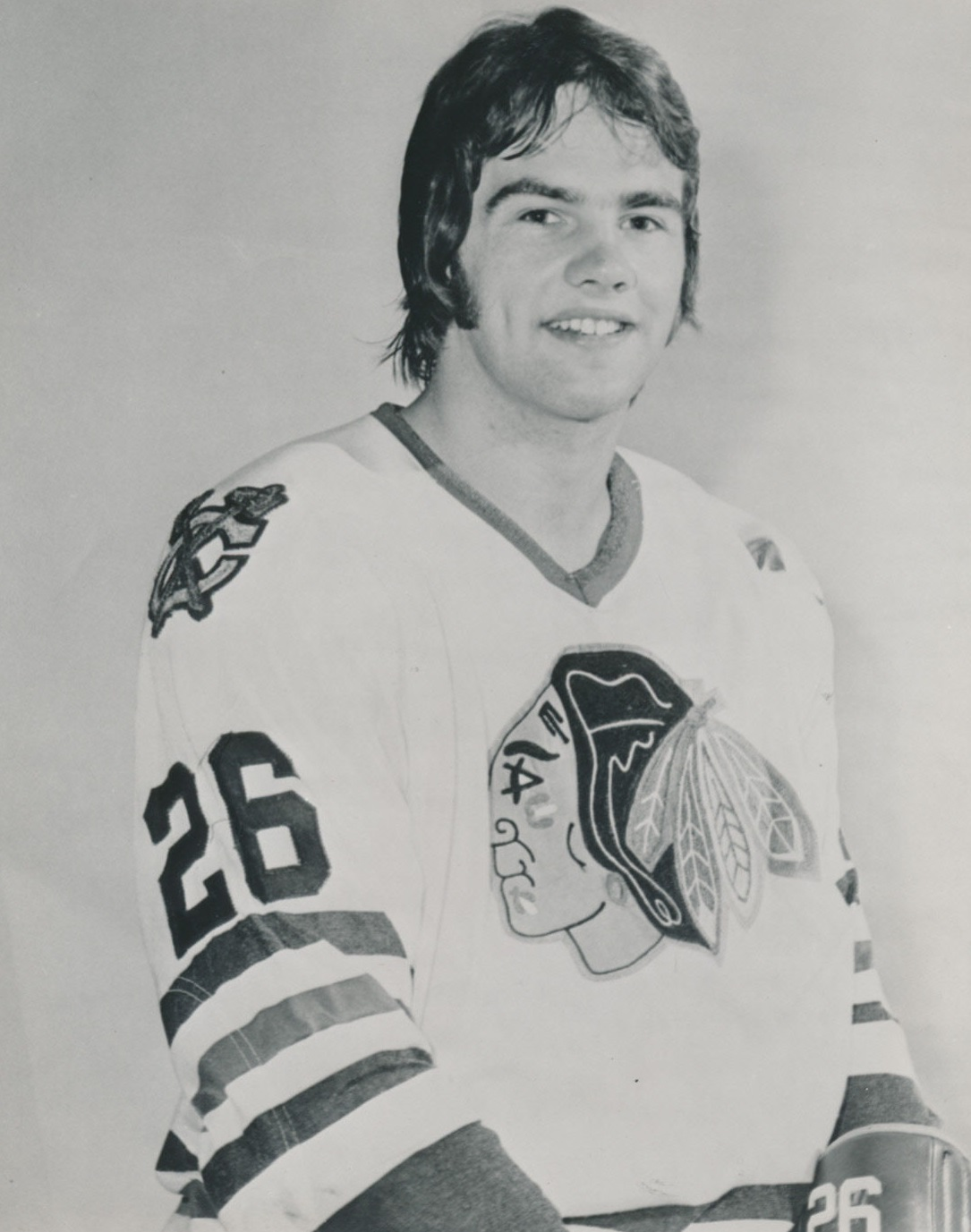
- Donaldson in 1973
- Born: July 15, 1952 (age 73) Trail, British Columbia, Canada
- Height: 5 ft 9 in (175 cm)
- Weight: 190 lb (86 kg; 13 st 8 lb)
- Position: Right wing
- Shot: Right
- Played for: Chicago Black Hawks; Houston Aeros
- NHL draft: 141st overall, 1972; Chicago Black Hawks
- Playing career: 1972–1977

Robert Gary Donaldson (born July 15, 1952) is a Canadian former professional ice hockey player. He played one game for the Chicago Black Hawks of the National Hockey League and 5 games for the WHA's Houston Aeros between 1973 and 1977. The rest of his career, which lasted from 19872 to 1977, was spent in the minor leagues. His one NHL game was on December 5, 1973 against the Detroit Red Wings

== Career statistics ==
=== Regular season and playoffs ===
			Regular season					Playoffs
Season	Team	League	GP	G	A	Pts	PIM	GP	G	A	Pts	PIM
1970–71	Penticton Broncos	BCJHL	60	37	53	90	61	—	—	—	—	—
1971–72	Victoria Cougars	WCHL	62	31	44	75	53	—	—	—	—	—
1972–73	Dallas Black Hawks	CHL	71	15	24	39	46	7	2	1	3	14
1973–74	Chicago Black Hawks	NHL	1	0	0	0	0	—	—	—	—	—
1973–74	Dallas Black Hawks	CHL	71	21	21	42	66	10	3	3	6	24
1974–75	Dallas Black Hawks	CHL	77	24	28	52	46	8	3	1	4	7
1975–76	Dallas Black Hawks	CHL	68	33	39	72	26	6	2	0	2	0
1976–77	Houston Aeros	WHA	5	0	0	0	6	—	—	—	—	—
1976–77	Oklahoma City Blazers	CHL	74	23	34	57	37	—	—	—	—	—
1978–79	Kamloops Cowboys	CarHL	—	—	—	—	—	—	—	—	—	—
1979–80	Kamloops Cowboys	BCSHL	—	—	—	—	—	—	—	—	—	—
1980–81	Kamloops Cowboys	BCSHL	—	—	—	—	—	—	—	—	—	—
WHA totals			5	0	0	0	6	—	—	—	—	—
NHL totals			1	0	0	0	0	—	—	—	—	—

== See also ==
- List of players who played only one game in the NHL
