= Brian Ogilvie =

Canadian ice hockey player (born 1952)

- Born: January 30, 1952 (age 74) Stettler, Alberta, Canada
- Height: 5 ft 11 in (180 cm)
- Weight: 186 lb (84 kg; 13 st 4 lb)
- Position: Centre
- Shot: Right
- Played for: Chicago Black Hawks; St. Louis Blues
- NHL draft: 29th overall, 1972; Chicago Black Hawks
- Playing career: 1972–1980

Brian Hugh Ogilvie (born January 30, 1952) is a Canadian former professional ice hockey player. He played 90 games in the National Hockey League for the Chicago Black Hawks and St. Louis Blues between 1972 and 1979. The rest of his career, which lasted from 1972 to 1980, was spent in various minor leagues.

== Career statistics ==
=== Regular season and playoffs ===
			Regular season					Playoffs
Season	Team	League	GP	G	A	Pts	PIM	GP	G	A	Pts	PIM
1968–69	Red Deer Rustlers	AJHL	2	1	0	1	0	—	—	—	—	—
1969–70	Red Deer Rustlers	AJHL	40	24	17	41	52	—	—	—	—	—
1970–71	Red Deer Rustlers	AJHL	44	29	47	76	106	—	—	—	—	—
1971–72	Vancouver Nats	WCHL	21	11	17	28	21	—	—	—	—	—
1971–72	Edmonton Oil Kings	WCHL	33	23	32	55	40	16	7	7	14	24
1971–72	Edmonton Oil Kings	M-Cup	—	—	—	—	—	2	1	1	2	4
1972–73	Chicago Black Hawks	NHL	12	1	2	3	4	—	—	—	—	—
1972–73	Dallas Black Hawks	CHL	58	17	25	42	64	7	1	2	3	16
1973–74	Dallas Black Hawks	CHL	70	21	33	54	66	10	2	2	4	4
1974–75	St. Louis Blues	NHL	20	5	5	10	4	—	—	—	—	—
1974–75	Denver Spurs	CHL	34	20	12	32	45	2	1	0	1	0
1975–76	St. Louis Blues	NHL	9	2	1	3	2	—	—	—	—	—
1975–76	Providence Reds	AHL	47	16	18	34	61	3	0	2	2	9
1976–77	St. Louis Blues	NHL	3	0	0	0	0	—	—	—	—	—
1976–77	Kansas City Blues	CHL	66	26	28	54	91	10	2	4	6	17
1977–78	St. Louis Blues	NHL	32	6	8	14	12	—	—	—	—	—
1977–78	Salt Lake Golden Eagles	CHL	15	7	7	14	22	—	—	—	—	—
1978–79	St. Louis Blues	NHL	14	1	5	6	7	—	—	—	—	—
1978–79	Salt Lake Golden Eagles	CHL	59	26	28	54	72	5	0	5	5	8
1979–80	Salt Lake Golden Eagles	CHL	75	30	31	61	88	13	5	9	14	16
CHL totals			377	147	164	311	448	47	11	22	33	61
NHL totals			90	15	21	36	29	—	—	—	—	—
