= Dwayne Lowdermilk =

Canadian ice hockey player

- Born: January 9, 1958 (age 68) Burnaby, British Columbia, Canada
- Height: 5 ft 11 in (180 cm)
- Weight: 201 lb (91 kg; 14 st 5 lb)
- Position: Defence
- Shot: Right
- Played for: Washington Capitals
- NHL draft: 51st overall, 1978; New York Islanders
- Playing career: 1978–1982

Dwayne Kenneth Lowdermilk (born January 9, 1958) is a Canadian retired ice hockey defenceman. He played two games in the National Hockey League for the Washington Capitals during the 1980–81 season. He was selected by the New York Islanders in the 1978 NHL entry draft.

Lowdermilk was born in Burnaby, British Columbia. As a youth, he played in the 1971 Quebec International Pee-Wee Hockey Tournament with a minor ice hockey team from Burnaby.

== Career statistics ==
=== Regular season and playoffs ===
			Regular season					Playoffs
Season	Team	League	GP	G	A	Pts	PIM	GP	G	A	Pts	PIM
1973–74	Langley Lords	BCJHL	—	—	—	—	—	—	—	—	—	—
1974–75	Langley Lords	BCJHL	—	13	31	44	—	—	—	—	—	—
1975–76	Langley Lords	BCJHL	—	—	—	—	—	—	—	—	—	—
1975–76	Kamloops Chiefs	WCHL	35	5	7	12	10	12	0	2	2	2
1976–77	Kamloops Chiefs	WCHL	72	13	46	59	79	5	1	1	2	0
1977–78	Seattle Breakers	WCHL	71	28	58	86	108	—	—	—	—	—
1978–79	Fort Worth Texans	CHL	75	13	37	50	63	4	0	0	0	2
1979–80	Indianapolis Checkers	CHL	79	7	29	36	38	7	2	2	4	0
1980–81	Washington Capitals	NHL	2	0	1	1	2	—	—	—	—	—
1980–81	Fort Wayne Komets	IHL	21	7	10	17	19	—	—	—	—	—
1980–81	Indianapolis Checkers	CHL	5	0	4	4	8	—	—	—	—	—
1980–81	Hershey Bears	AHL	46	6	17	23	28	5	2	1	3	2
1981–82	Hershey Bears	AHL	70	4	34	38	44	5	1	3	4	2
AHL totals			116	10	51	61	72	10	3	4	7	4
CHL totals			159	20	70	90	109	11	2	2	4	2
NHL totals			2	0	1	1	2	—	—	—	—	—

== Awards ==
- WCHL Second All-Star Team – 1978
