= Dev Dley =

Canadian lawyer and judge (born 1950/1951)

- Born: 1950 or 1951 (age 74–75)
- Occupations: Lawyer, judge
- Known for: commissioner of the Western Hockey League

S. Dev Dley (born 1950/1951 (Note: In 1995, Dley was reported to be 44)) is a Canadian lawyer and judge. From 1996 to 2000, he served as commissioner of the Western Hockey League (WHL). He was later elected Chair of the Law Foundation of B.C., which he held until 2010, when he was promoted to the Supreme Court of British Columbia.

== Career ==
After earning his law degree from the University of Victoria in 1978, Dley began a private law practice which lasted until 1996. He also served as legal counsel of the Western Hockey League (WHL) for five years before he was promoted to commissioner in 1995. During his time as commissioner, he dealt with a sexual abuse case regarding Sheldon Kennedy and coach Graham James. In response to criticisms for lack of action, Dley stated that the league had not conducted an investigation because there had been no formal complaint about the assault. However, he later promised to hire a counseling agency for players in the league, as a result of the case.

While discussions on extension of his contract with the league were ongoing, he also sat on the National Junior Team Policy Committee which appointed head coaches for 1999 Men's Ice Hockey World Championships. Dley was an advocate for the league to expand into Winnipeg and planned on hosting discussions with interested parties in January 2000.

Despite rumors to the contrary, Dley's contract was not renewed; he was replaced by Ron Robison in 2000. After his time as commissioner, Dley was appointed to the Queen's Counsel and sat as director on the B.C. Traffic Safety Foundation. In 2008, he was named Chair of the Law Foundation of B.C., a position he held until his appointment as a Justice of the Supreme Court of British Columbia in 2010.

== Memberships and affiliations ==
Dley served two terms as vice president of the Social Credit Party of Canada.

== Personal life ==
Dley is a Sikh.
