= Kevin Evans (ice hockey) =

Canadian ice hockey player

- Born: July 10, 1965 (age 60) Peterborough, Ontario, Canada
- Height: 5 ft 10 in (178 cm)
- Weight: 182 lb (83 kg; 13 st 0 lb)
- Position: Left wing
- Shot: Left
- Played for: Minnesota North Stars; San Jose Sharks
- NHL draft: Undrafted
- Playing career: 1985–2000

Kevin Robert Evans (born July 10, 1965) is a Canadian former professional ice hockey winger who played briefly for the Minnesota North Stars and San Jose Sharks of the NHL.

== Early life ==
Evans was born in Peterborough, Ontario, the brother of NHL hockey players Paul Evans and Doug Evans. As a youth, he played in the 1978 Quebec International Pee-Wee Hockey Tournament with a minor ice hockey team from Peterborough.

== Career ==
Evans is the all-time leader in penalty minutes for the IHL with 3,083, And until being surpassed by Dennis Bonvie in the 2008 season, he was the career leader in penalty minutes in all of professional hockey, and still holds the single season professional hockey mark of 648, recorded in the 1987 season with the Kalamazoo Wings of the International Hockey League.

== Career statistics ==
			Regular season					Playoffs
Season	Team	League	GP	G	A	Pts	PIM	GP	G	A	P	PIM
1983–84	Peterborough Petes	OHL	2	0	0	0	0	—	—	—	—	—
1984–85	London Knights	OHL	52	3	7	10	148	6	0	0	0	8
1985–86	Victoria Cougars	WHL	66	16	39	55	441	—	—	—	—	—
1985–86	Kalamazoo Wings	IHL	11	3	5	8	97	6	3	0	3	56
1986–87	Kalamazoo Wings	IHL	73	19	31	50	648	3	1	0	1	24
1987–88	Kalamazoo Wings	IHL	54	9	28	37	404	5	1	1	2	46
1988–89	Kalamazoo Wings	IHL	54	22	32	54	328	—	—	—	—	—
1989–90	Kalamazoo Wings	IHL	76	30	54	84	346	10	4	8	12	86
1990–91	Kalamazoo Wings	IHL	16	10	12	22	70	—	—	—	—	—
1990–91	Minnesota North Stars	NHL	4	0	0	0	19	—	—	—	—	—
1991–92	Kansas City Blades	IHL	66	10	39	49	342	14	2	13	15	70
1991–92	San Jose Sharks	NHL	5	0	1	1	25	—	—	—	—	—
1992–93	Kalamazoo Wings	IHL	49	7	24	31	283	—	—	—	—	—
1993–94	Peoria Rivermen	IHL	67	10	29	39	254	4	0	0	0	6
1994–95	Peoria Rivermen	IHL	29	5	9	14	121	—	—	—	—	—
1994–95	Kansas City Blades	IHL	26	3	6	9	192	19	2	4	6	111
1995–96	Memphis Riverkings	CHL	38	11	32	43	356	6	2	9	11	48
1996–97	Mississippi Sea Wolves	ECHL	63	19	27	46	505	3	1	1	2	21
1997–98	Mississippi Sea Wolves	ECHL	38	8	18	26	234	—	—	—	—	—
1999–00	Tupelo T-Rex	WPHL	25	0	2	2	131	2	0	1	1	4
1999–00	Memphis Riverkings	CHL	7	0	5	5	64	—	—	—	—	—
IHL totals			517	128	271	399	3083	61	17	22	39	399
NHL totals			9	0	1	1	44	—	—	—	—	—
