= Geordie Robertson =

Canadian ice hockey player

- Born: August 1, 1959 (age 66) Victoria, British Columbia, Canada
- Height: 6 ft 0 in (183 cm)
- Weight: 165 lb (75 kg; 11 st 11 lb)
- Position: Right wing
- Shot: Right
- Played for: Buffalo Sabres
- NHL draft: Undrafted
- Playing career: 1979–1989

Geordie Jay Robertson (born August 1, 1959) is a Canadian former professional ice hockey centre. He played in five games in the National Hockey League with the Buffalo Sabres during the 1982–83 season. The rest of his career, which lasted from 1979 to 1989, was mainly spent in the minor American Hockey League.

== Biography ==
Born in Victoria, British Columbia, Roberston is the brother of Torrie Robertson. As a youth, Robertson played in the 1971 Quebec International Pee-Wee Hockey Tournament with a minor ice hockey team from Victoria.

He played in five games in the National Hockey League with the Buffalo Sabres during the 1982–83 season, going one goal and adding two assists.

Robertson was the leading scorer on two American Hockey League Calder Cup-winning teams, the 1982–83 Rochester Americans and the 1985–86 Adirondack Red Wings. He was the Coach of the varsity hockey team at Monroe Community College in Rochester, New York from 2000 to 2004. In 1993, he was inducted into the Rochester Americans Hall of Fame.

== Career statistics ==
=== Regular season and playoffs ===
			Regular season					Playoffs
Season	Team	League	GP	G	A	Pts	PIM	GP	G	A	Pts	PIM
1975–76	Nanaimo Clippers	BCHL	—	—	—	—	—	—	—	—	—	—
1975–76	Victoria Cougars	WCHL	3	3	2	5	0	—	—	—	—	—
1976–77	Victoria Cougars	WCHL	72	39	44	83	107	4	0	2	2	7
1977–78	Victoria Cougars	WCHL	61	64	72	136	85	13	15	11	26	42
1978–79	Victoria Cougars	WHL	54	31	42	73	94	14	15	10	25	22
1979–80	Rochester Americans	AHL	55	26	26	52	66	4	1	4	5	2
1980–81	Rochester Americans	AHL	20	3	3	6	19	—	—	—	—	—
1981–82	Rochester Americans	AHL	46	14	15	29	45	9	1	3	4	13
1982–83	Buffalo Sabres	NHL	5	1	2	3	7	—	—	—	—	—
1982–83	Rochester Americans	AHL	72	46	73	119	83	16	8	6	14	23
1983–84	Rochester Americans	AHL	64	37	54	91	103	18	9	9	18	42
1984–85	Rochester Americans	AHL	70	27	48	75	91	5	0	1	1	4
1985–86	Adirondack Red Wings	AHL	79	36	56	92	99	15	4	6	10	25
1986–87	Adirondack Red Wings	AHL	63	28	41	69	94	—	—	—	—	—
1987–88	JYP Jyväskylä	FIN	34	14	6	20	28	—	—	—	—	—
1987–88	Adirondack Red Wings	AHL	30	11	15	26	24	6	1	2	3	14
1988–89	Rochester Americans	AHL	32	11	12	23	12	—	—	—	—	—
AHL totals			531	239	343	582	636	73	24	31	55	123
NHL totals			5	1	2	3	7	—	—	—	—	—
