= Torrie Robertson =

Canadian ice hockey player

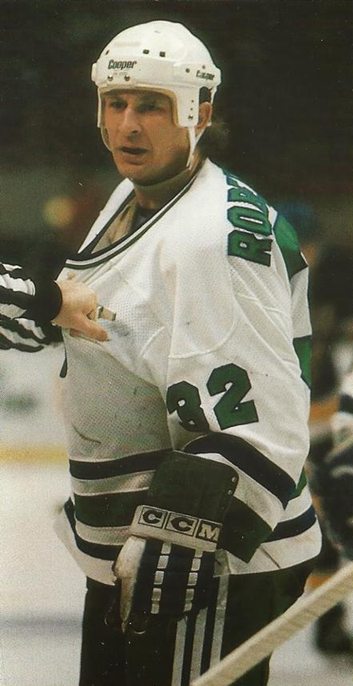
- Born: August 2, 1961 (age 64) Victoria, British Columbia, Canada
- Height: 5 ft 11 in (180 cm)
- Weight: 195 lb (88 kg; 13 st 13 lb)
- Position: Left wing
- Shot: Left
- Played for: Washington Capitals; Hartford Whalers; Detroit Red Wings
- NHL draft: 55th overall, 1980; Washington Capitals
- Playing career: 1981–1991

Torrie Andrew Robertson (born August 2, 1961) is a Canadian former ice hockey player who played for the Washington Capitals, Hartford Whalers and Detroit Red Wings of the National Hockey League.

== Career ==
Drafted in 1980 by the Capitals, Robertson was traded to the Whalers in 1983. Primarily known as an enforcer, he is the Whalers' all-time penalty minutes leader with 1,368. He was a member of the WHL Second All-Star Team in 1981.

== Personal life ==
Torrie is the brother of Geordie Robertson.

== Career statistics ==
=== Regular season and playoffs ===
			Regular season					Playoffs
Season	Team	League	GP	G	A	Pts	PIM	GP	G	A	Pts	PIM
1976–77	Nanaimo Clippers	BCJHL	—	25	16	41	—	—	—	—	—	—
1976–77	Victoria Cougars	WCHL	1	0	0	0	0	—	—	—	—	—
1977–78	Nanaimo Clippers	BCJHL	34	15	15	30	198	—	—	—	—	—
1978–79	Victoria Cougars	WHL	69	18	23	41	141	15	1	2	3	29
1979–80	Victoria Cougars	WHL	72	23	24	47	298	17	5	7	12	117
1980–81	Victoria Cougars	WHL	59	45	66	111	274	15	10	13	23	55
1980–81	Victoria Cougars	M-Cup	—	—	—	—	—	4	2	2	4	6
1980–81	Washington Capitals	NHL	3	0	0	0	0	—	—	—	—	—
1981–82	Washington Capitals	NHL	54	8	13	21	204	—	—	—	—	—
1981–82	Hershey Bears	AHL	21	5	3	8	60	—	—	—	—	—
1982–83	Washington Capitals	NHL	5	2	0	2	4	—	—	—	—	—
1982–83	Hershey Bears	AHL	69	21	33	54	187	5	1	2	3	8
1983–84	Hartford Whalers	NHL	66	7	13	20	198	—	—	—	—	—
1984–85	Hartford Whalers	NHL	74	11	30	41	337	—	—	—	—	—
1985–86	Hartford Whalers	NHL	76	13	24	37	358	10	1	0	1	67
1986–87	Hartford Whalers	NHL	20	1	0	1	98	—	—	—	—	—
1987–88	Hartford Whalers	NHL	63	2	8	10	293	6	0	1	1	6
1988–89	Hartford Whalers	NHL	27	2	4	6	84	—	—	—	—	—
1988–89	Detroit Red Wings	NHL	12	2	2	4	63	6	1	0	1	17
1989–90	Detroit Red Wings	NHL	42	1	5	6	112	—	—	—	—	—
1989–90	Adirondack Red Wings	AHL	27	3	13	16	47	6	1	1	2	33
1990–91	Rochester Americans	AHL	1	0	1	1	0	—	—	—	—	—
1990–91	Albany Choppers	IHL	1	0	0	0	0	—	—	—	—	—
NHL totals			442	49	99	148	1751	22	2	1	3	90
