= Kalamazoo Wings (1974–2000) =

- City: Kalamazoo, Michigan, United States
- League: IHL
- Conference: Eastern
- Founded: 1974
- Operated: 1974–2000
- Home arena: Wings Stadium
- Colors: Green, gold, black, white
- Owner: R.T. Parfet
- Affiliates: Detroit Red Wings (NHL); Minnesota North Stars/Dallas Stars (NHL)

Franchise history
- 1974–1995: Kalamazoo Wings
- 1995–2000: Michigan K-Wings

Championships
- Regular season titles: 2 IHL 1979–80, 1980–81
- Division titles: 5 IHL 1979–80, 1980–81, 1990–91, 1993–94, 1998–99
- Conference titles: 3 IHL 1979–80, 1980–81, 1981-82
- Turner Cups: 2 IHL 1978–79, 1979–80

The Kalamazoo Wings, nicknamed the K-Wings, were a professional ice hockey team in Kalamazoo, Michigan. The team played in the International Hockey League from the 1974–75 season to the 1999–2000 season. The team played in Wings Stadium and was affiliated with the National Hockey League's Detroit Red Wings, Minnesota North Stars, and the Dallas Stars.

== History ==
That team, which had named itself for its affiliation with the NHL Detroit Red Wings, changed its name during the 1995 playoffs to the Michigan K-Wings because the league wanted to raise its appeal for expanding to larger markets. The team's owner, the late R.T. Parfet, was the only small-market owner to oblige. However, concerns about larger-market teams entering the league, the league's instability, and the Dallas Stars ending their affiliation led to the Wings owners to request inactive status on April 17, 2000, and the team was dissolved. The IHL would fold a season later before the franchise could be resurrected.

The original team colors were red, white, and blue until the end of the 1987–88 season when the owners announced that they would change colors to green, gold, black, and white to match their new NHL affiliate, the Minnesota North Stars.

On July 27, 2000, the Madison Kodiaks of the United Hockey League announced that they were moving to Kalamazoo for the 2000–01 season, and would be known as the Kalamazoo Wings. The new K-Wings also obtained the rights to use the original team's name, colors, logos, and history as their own.

== Championships ==
Year	League	Trophy
1979–1980	IHL	Turner Cup
1978–1979	IHL	Turner Cup

== Standings ==
Year	GP	W	L	T/OTL*	PTS	GF	GA	Pct	Standings
1974–1975	75	17	53	5	39	203	318	.260	10 of 11
1975–1976	78	27	41	10	6	273	318	.410	8 of 9
1976–1977	78	38	27	13	89	325	290	.571	2 of 9
1977–1978	80	35	31	14	84	315	288	.525	4 of 9
1978–1979	80	40	28	12	92	368	327	.575	4 of 9
1979–1980	80	45	26	9	99	366	274	.619	1 of 10
1980–1981	82	52	20	10	114	369	244	.704	1 of 8
1981–1982	82	41	36	5	89	355	333	.543	3 of 7
1982–1983	82	32	44	6	76	311	341	.463	5 of 8
1983–1984	82	37	38	7	83	333	316	.506	5 of 7
1984–1985	82	40	35	7	89	323	297	.543	5 of 9
1985–1986	82	47	35	0	100	345	314	.610	4 of 10
1986–1987	82	36	46	0	80	331	353	.479	8 of 9
1987–1988	82	37	33	12	86	328	360	.524	7 of 9
1988–1989	82	39	36	7	85	345	350	.518	6 of 10
1989–1990	82	53	23	6	112	389	311	.682	3 of 9
1990–1991	82	52	29	1	105	354	302	.640	2 of 11
1991–1992	82	37	35	10	84	292	312	.512	7 of 10
1992–1993	82	29	42	11	69	291	367	.421	10 of 12
1993–1994	81	48	26	7	103	337	297	.636	5 of 13
1994–1995	81	43	24	14	100	288	249	.617	5 of 17
1995–1996	82	40	24	18	98	290	272	.598	7 of 19
1996–1997	82	31	44	7	69	208	272	.421	17 of 19
1997–1998	82	39	36	7	79	223	261	.518	15 of 18
1998–1999	82	35	34	13	83	232	253	.506	11 of 16
1999–2000	82	33	37	12	78	178	223	.476	12 of 13

(*) - For 1987–1988 season Overtime Losses were tracked instead of Ties

== Players ==
=== Team captains ===
- Al Genovy, 1974-1978
- Tom Ross 1979-80
- Rob Plumb 1980-81
- John Flesch 1984-85
- Mitch Messier early 90s
- Brad Berry, 1995–99
- Unknown, 1999–00

== Team records ==
=== Retired numbers ===
- #22 Mike Wanchuk
- #26 Kevin Schamehorn

=== Single season ===
Goals: 66 (Canada) Dave Michayluk (1984–85)
Assists: 113 (Canada) Rob Brown (1993–94)
Points: 155 (Canada) Rob Brown (1993–94)
Penalty minutes: 648 (Canada) Kevin Evans (1986–87)

=== Career ===
Career goals: 239 (Canada) Mike Wanchuk and (Canada) Kevin Schamehorn
Career assists: 308 (Canada) Brent Jarrett
Career points: 475 (Canada) Kevin Schamehorn
Career penalty minutes: 2,176 (Canada) Kevin Evans
Career games played: 495 (Canada) Kevin Schamehorn (1976–90)
