= Dan Near =

Canadian ice hockey executive (born 1980)

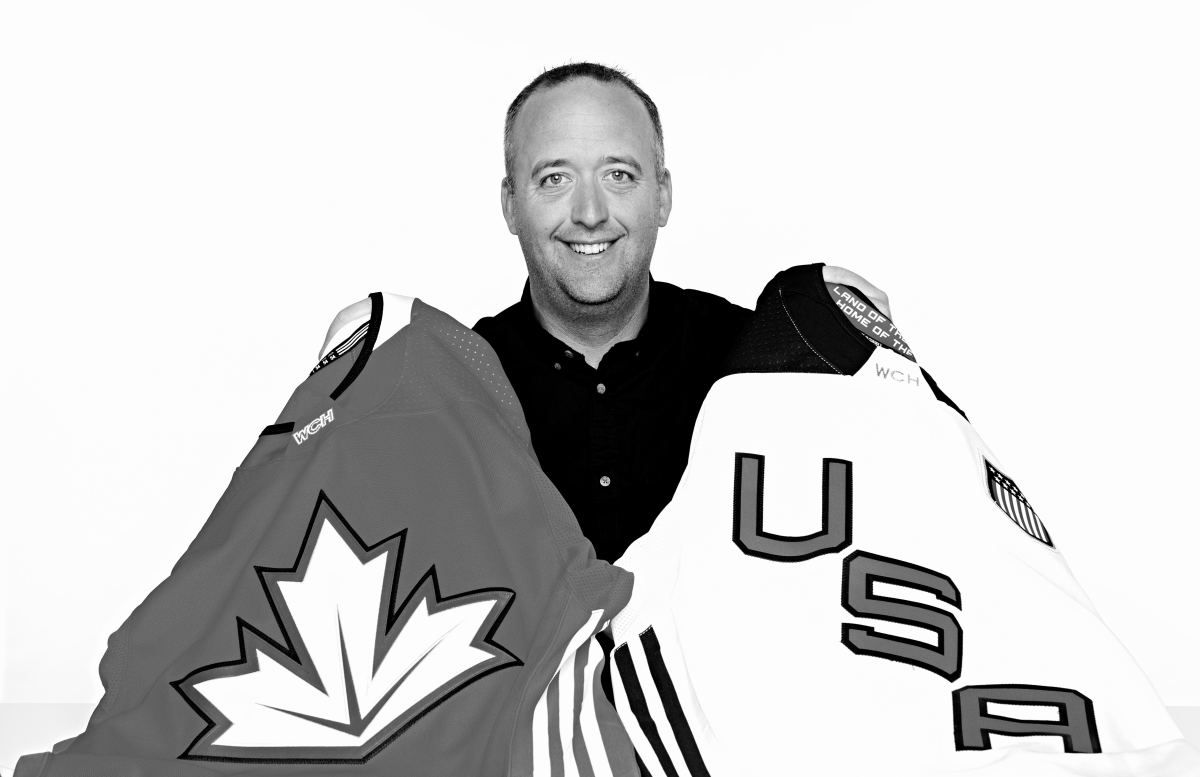
- Near with the adidas jerseys worn at the 2016 World Cup of Hockey
- Born: Daniel Robert Near; October 6, 1980 (age 46); Toronto, Ontario, Canada
- Education: B.A., Arts and Sciences, University of Western Ontario; Masters of Business Administration, University of Miami, Ohio
- Occupation: Commissioner of the Western Hockey League

Daniel Robert Near (born October 6, 1980) is a Canadian ice hockey executive, and commissioner of the Western Hockey League (WHL). He previously worked at Adidas in a variety of roles between 2016 and 2023, including Global Head of Hockey, leading adidas' entry into Ice Hockey and management of its NHL partnership, and later senior director, Creation Centre Portland. Previous to that, he served as senior director, consumer products and licensing at the National Hockey League.

== Early life and education ==
Near was born in Toronto, Ontario to parents John and Nancy in 1980. The oldest of three siblings, Near grew up in Markham, Ontario, and attended secondary school at St. Andrew's College, an all boys private school in Aurora, Ontario. He was active in athletics, playing competitive baseball, hockey, football, and lacrosse.

Near obtained a bachelor's degree in Administrative and Commercial Studies with a Finance concentration from Huron University College. While there he was a member of the Western University Mustangs football team in the 1999–2000 season. He obtained a Master's in business administration from Miami University in Ohio in 2006.

== Business career ==
=== National Hockey League ===
From 2006 to 2016, Near worked as a Marketing Executive for the National Hockey League, based at the league head offices in Manhattan. Serving as the Director of Consumer Products and Licensing for the NHL, he was responsible for retail marketing and global development in all channels of distributions for the NHL's consumer products business, and helped NHL's consumer products business reach more than 1B in annual retail sales.

=== Adidas ===
From 2016 to 2023, Near served as the Global Head of Adidas Hockey, based in Portland, Oregon. During Near's tenure, Adidas signed multiple high-profile NHL athletes to sponsorship contracts, including Sidney Crosby, P.K. Subban, and Brent Burns. Near also led the team that spearheaded the popular "Reverse Retro" NHL jersey program.

== WHL commissioner ==
Near was announced as the commissioner of the Western Hockey League on November 30, 2023. Near was chosen for the role of commissioner following a search led by Vancouver Giants owner Ron Toigo. Near assumed the role of commissioner on February 15, 2024, succeeding Ron Robison who retired from the Western Hockey Leagues after 24 years.

== Awards and recognitions ==
In 2013, Near was named to the Sporting Goods Business 40 under 40. In 2016, Near was named one of George Brown College's 5 to Watch winners for his work as Global Head of Adidas Hockey. In Jan 2023, Near was ranked number 52 on The Hockey News' list of People of Power and Influence in the world of hockey.

== Personal life ==
Near is married with three children and resides in Calgary, Alberta. Prior to taking the position as WHL commissioner, Near and his family resided in Portland, Oregon.
