= Paul Evans (ice hockey, born 1955) =

Canadian ice hockey player

- Born: February 24, 1955 (age 70) Peterborough, Ontario, Canada
- Height: 5 ft 10 in (178 cm)
- Weight: 195 lb (88 kg; 13 st 13 lb)
- Position: Right wing
- Shot: Left
- Played for: Toronto Maple Leafs
- NHL draft: 149th overall, 1975; Toronto Maple Leafs
- WHA draft: 162nd overall, 1975; Indianapolis Racers
- Playing career: 1975–1979

Paul Edward Vincent Evans (born February 24, 1955) is a Canadian former professional ice hockey player. He played 11 games in the National Hockey League with the Toronto Maple Leafs during the 1976–77 and 1977–78 seasons. The rest of his career, which lasted from 1975 to 1979, was spent in the minor leagues. He was born in Peterborough, Ontario, and is the brother of two other NHL hockey players, Doug Evans and Kevin Evans.

== Early life ==
As a child, Paul Evans was a gifted athlete, winning his team championships in hockey, softball, and lacrosse.

== Hockey career ==
Paul Evans played for the Peterborough Petes from 1971 to 1975. In 1971, he played in the Memorial Cup finals. In 1973, he joined his team on a trip to the Soviet Union.

Paul Evans was drafted into both the National Hockey League and the World Hockey Association in 1975. The Toronto Maple Leafs took him in round 9, 149th overall in the 1975 NHL Amateur Draft, while the Indianapolis Racers took him in round 13, 162nd overall in the 1975 WHA Amateur Draft.

Despite being drafted into both major leagues, he never played in the WHA, only in the NHL. He played a total of 11 games over two seasons, 1976–77 and 1977–78, in the NHL, all for the Toronto Maple Leafs. He scored one goal and had two points.

== Lacrosse career ==
During the hockey off-season of his major junior years, he played professional lacrosse. From 1972 to 1975, he joined four teams that were vying for the Minto Cup. He also played in four lacrosse teams vying for the Mann Cup in 1978, 1980, 1982 and 1984.

After he retired from professional sports, Evans became a lacrosse coach in his hometown of Peterborough for 17 years. As a coach, his team won the Minto Cup once.

== Career statistics ==
=== Regular season and playoffs ===
			Regular season					Playoffs
Season	Team	League	GP	G	A	Pts	PIM	GP	G	A	Pts	PIM
1973–74	Peterborough Petes	OHA	67	15	30	45	181	—	—	—	—	—
1974–75	Peterborough Petes	OMJHL	70	25	70	95	192	10	5	7	12	39
1975–76	Oklahoma City Blazers	CHL	67	7	23	30	179	4	0	1	1	24
1976–77	Toronto Maple Leafs	NHL	7	1	1	2	19	2	0	0	0	0
1976–77	Dallas Black Hawks	CHL	71	18	46	64	163	5	0	2	2	15
1977–78	Toronto Maple Leafs	NHL	4	0	0	0	2	—	—	—	—	—
1977–78	Dallas Black Hawks	CHL	74	16	39	55	116	13	1	11	12	20
1978–79	Saginaw Gears	IHL	11	0	11	11	24	—	—	—	—	—
1978–79	Flint Generals	IHL	38	7	27	34	93	—	—	—	—	—
CHL totals			212	41	108	149	458	22	1	14	15	59
NHL totals			11	1	1	2	21	2	0	0	0	0

=== International ===
Year	Team	Event	GP	G	A	Pts	PIM
1974	Canada	WJC	5	1	1	2	13
Junior totals			5	1	1	2	13
