= Victoria Cougars (WHL) =

- City: Victoria, British Columbia
- League: Western Hockey League
- Operated: 1971–94
- Home arena: Victoria Memorial Arena
- Colours: Blue, red, gold and white

Franchise history
- 1971–1994: Victoria Cougars
- 1994-present: Prince George Cougars

The Victoria Cougars were a major junior ice hockey team based in Victoria, British Columbia that played in the WCHL (Western Canadian Hockey League) a precursor to the Western Hockey League between 1971 and 1994. Prior to 1971, the Cougars were members of the Pacific Coast Junior Hockey League (1962–1967) and the British Columbia Junior Hockey League (1967–1971). The Cougars played their home games at the Victoria Memorial Arena, which was demolished in 2003.

They won the WHL championship in 1981. The team moved to Prince George, British Columbia in 1994 and are now the Prince George Cougars. The Cougars earned several WHL records during their time in Victoria, both for most wins (60 in 1980–81) and for fewest points (12 in 1989–90). Their five wins that season set a WHL record for futility within a 72-game season, which included a record setting 32 game losing streak (November 22, 1989 – February 11, 1990).

== Season-by-season record ==
Note: GP = Games played, W = Wins, L = Losses, T = Ties Pts = Points, GF = Goals for, GA = Goals against

Season	GP	W	L	T	GF	GA	Points	Finish	Playoffs
1967–68	40	11	23	6	146	198	28	6th BCJHL	DNQ
1968–69	40	22	12	6	223	150	50	1st BCJHL	Won League, won Mowat Cup
1969–70	48	31	12	5	238	155	67	2nd BCJHL	Lost final
1970–71	60	40	12	8	348	187	88	1st BCJHL	Lost quarter-final
1971–72	68	18	48	2	215	321	38	5th West	Out of playoffs
1972–73	68	13	51	4	231	390	30	5th West	Out of playoffs
1973–74	68	22	40	6	259	336	50	5th West	Out of playoffs
1974–75	70	47	18	5	416	257	99	1st West; 1st WCHL	Lost semi-final
1975–76	72	37	28	7	343	320	81	4th West	Lost semi-final
1976–77	72	27	32	13	299	301	67	4th West	Lost quarter-final
1977–78	72	34	29	9	365	333	77	2nd West	Lost West Division final
1978–79	72	34	27	11	318	295	79	2nd West	Lost West Division final
1979–80	72	51	21	0	349	226	102	2nd West	Lost final
1980–81	72	60	11	1	462	217	121	1st West; 1st WHL	Won championship
1981–82	72	43	28	1	398	314	87	2nd West	Lost West Division semi-final
1982–83	72	47	24	1	444	335	95	2nd West	Lost West Division final
1983–84	72	32	40	0	340	338	64	5th West	Out of playoffs
1984–85	72	24	43	4	314	385	52	6th West	Out of playoffs
1985–86	72	22	49	1	346	439	45	6th West	Out of playoffs
1986–87	72	30	41	1	334	412	61	4th West	Lost West Division semi-final
1987–88	72	37	34	1	326	335	75	3rd West	Lost West Division semi-final
1988–89	72	36	32	4	341	351	76	2nd West	Lost West Division semi-final
1989–90	72	5	65	2	221	565	12	6th West	Out of playoffs
1990–91	72	10	59	3	201	437	23	6th West	Out of playoffs
1991–92	72	15	52	5	231	372	35	7th West	Out of playoffs
1992–93	72	20	49	3	217	326	43	7th West	Out of playoffs
1993–94	72	18	51	3	222	393	39	7th West	Out of playoffs

== NHL alumni ==
There were 58 alumni of the Victoria Cougars who graduated from junior hockey to play in the National Hockey League. Source. Goaltender Grant Fuhr was inducted in the Hockey Hall of Fame.

- Greg Adams
- Micah Aivazoff
- Jim Atamanenko
- Murray Bannerman
- Len Barrie
- Fred Berry
- Wayne Bianchin
- Alexandre Boikov
- Mel Bridgman
- Don Cairns
- Rich Chernomaz
- Kim Clackson
- Glen Cochrane
- Geoff Courtnall
- Russ Courtnall
- Bruce Cowick
- Paul Cyr
- Gary Donaldson
- Kevin Evans
- Tony Feltrin
- Wade Flaherty
- Curt Fraser
- Grant Fuhr
- Lorry Gloeckner
- Richard Hajdu
- Archie Henderson
- Matt Hervey
- Al Hill
- Garry Howatt
- Brent Hughes
- Stu Kulak
- Rick Lapointe
- Mike Leclerc
- Danny Lucas
- Gary Lupul
- David Mackey
- Tom Martin
- Chris Mason
- Jeff McDill
- Bob McGill
- Jack McIlhargey
- Jim McKenzie
- John Mokosak
- Mark Morrison
- John Newberry
- Brad Palmer
- Steve Passmore
- Barry Pederson
- George Pesut
- Ken Priestlay
- Gordie Roberts
- Geordie Robertson
- Torrie Robertson
- Joel Savage
- Greg Tebbutt
- Mike Toal
- Alexander Vasilevski
- Terry Virtue
- Simon Wheeldon
- Darryl Williams

== See also ==
- List of ice hockey teams in British Columbia
