= Doug Evans (ice hockey) =

Canadian ice hockey player

- Born: June 2, 1963 (age 62) Peterborough, Ontario, Canada
- Height: 5 ft 9 in (175 cm)
- Weight: 185 lb (84 kg; 13 st 3 lb)
- Position: Left wing
- Shot: Left
- Played for: St. Louis Blues; Winnipeg Jets; Philadelphia Flyers
- NHL draft: Undrafted
- Playing career: 1984–1999

Douglas Thomas Evans (born June 2, 1963) is a Canadian former professional ice hockey left winger who played in the National Hockey League (NHL) for the St. Louis Blues, Winnipeg Jets, and Philadelphia Flyers. As a youth, he played in the 1976 Quebec International Pee-Wee Hockey Tournament with a minor ice hockey team from Peterborough, Ontario.

Evans is the brother of the NHL hockey players Paul Evans and Kevin Evans.

== Career statistics ==
=== Regular season and playoffs ===
			Regular season					Playoffs
Season	Team	League	GP	G	A	Pts	PIM	GP	G	A	Pts	PIM
1980–81	Peterborough Petes	OHL	51	9	24	33	139	—	—	—	—	—
1981–82	Peterborough Petes	OHL	56	17	49	66	176	9	0	2	2	41
1982–83	Peterborough Petes	OHL	65	31	55	86	165	4	0	3	3	23
1983–84	Peterborough Petes	OHL	61	45	79	124	98	8	4	12	16	26
1984–85	Peoria Rivermen	IHL	81	36	61	97	189	20	8	11	19	88
1985–86	St. Louis Blues	NHL	13	1	0	1	2	—	—	—	—	—
1985–86	Peoria Rivermen	IHL	60	46	51	97	179	10	4	6	10	32
1986–87	St. Louis Blues	NHL	53	3	13	16	91	5	0	0	0	10
1986–87	Peoria Rivermen	IHL	18	10	15	25	39	—	—	—	—	—
1987–88	St. Louis Blues	NHL	41	5	7	12	49	2	0	0	0	0
1987–88	Peoria Rivermen	IHL	11	4	16	20	64	—	—	—	—	—
1988–89	St. Louis Blues	NHL	53	7	12	19	81	7	1	2	3	16
1989–90	St. Louis Blues	NHL	3	0	0	0	0	—	—	—	—	—
1989–90	Winnipeg Jets	NHL	27	10	8	18	33	7	2	2	4	10
1989–90	Peoria Rivermen	IHL	42	19	28	47	128	—	—	—	—	—
1990–91	Winnipeg Jets	NHL	70	7	27	34	108	—	—	—	—	—
1991–92	Winnipeg Jets	NHL	30	7	7	14	68	1	0	0	0	2
1991–92	Moncton Hawks	AHL	10	7	8	15	10	—	—	—	—	—
1991–92	Peoria Rivermen	IHL	16	5	14	19	38	—	—	—	—	—
1992–93	Philadelphia Flyers	NHL	65	8	13	21	70	—	—	—	—	—
1993–94	Peoria Rivermen	IHL	76	27	63	90	108	6	2	6	8	10
1994–95	Peoria Rivermen	IHL	74	13	39	52	103	9	2	9	11	10
1995–96	Peoria Rivermen	IHL	74	19	48	67	81	1	0	0	0	0
1996–97	Peoria Rivermen	ECHL	67	23	59	82	128	10	10	12	22	20
1997–98	Peoria Rivermen	ECHL	52	27	37	64	98	3	0	1	1	4
1998–99	Peoria Rivermen	ECHL	57	14	46	60	112	4	0	5	5	10
IHL totals			452	179	335	514	929	46	16	32	48	140
NHL totals			355	48	87	135	502	22	3	4	7	38
