= Greg Joly =

Canadian ice hockey player (born 1954)

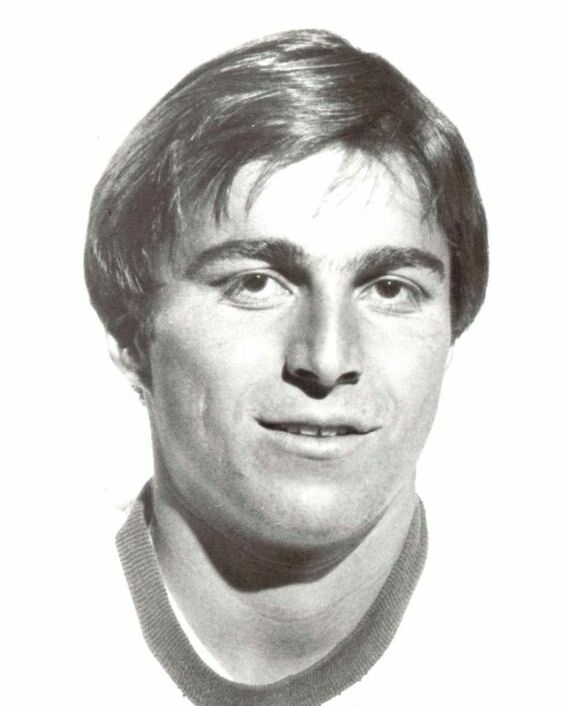
- Joly in 1979.
- Born: May 30, 1954 (age 72) Rocky Mountain House, Alberta, Canada
- Height: 6 ft 1 in (185 cm)
- Weight: 190 lb (86 kg; 13 st 8 lb)
- Position: Defence
- Shot: Left
- Played for: Washington Capitals; Detroit Red Wings
- NHL draft: 1st overall, 1974; Washington Capitals
- WHA draft: 31st overall, 1974; Phoenix Roadrunners
- Playing career: 1974–1986

Gregory James Joly (born May 30, 1954) is a Canadian former ice hockey player who played nine seasons in the National Hockey League (NHL) for the Washington Capitals and Detroit Red Wings. He won the 1974 Memorial Cup with the Regina Pats and the 1981 Calder Cup with the AHL's Adirondack Red Wings.

After winning the 1974 Memorial Cup with the Regina Pats, Joly was drafted first overall by the Washington Capitals in the 1974 NHL Amateur Draft (just a couple of days before his 20th birthday). Before the draft, Washington general manager Milt Schmidt explained that "Joly can do a lot of the same incredible things that Bobby Orr does." On May 28, 1974, Joly was the first of two Regina players selected in the first round (Clark Gillies was selected fourth overall by the Islanders).

Washington's general manager, Milt Schmidt, referred to Joly at the time as "the next Bobby Orr", but over his nine seasons playing with Washington (1974–76) and the Detroit Red Wings (1976–83), Joly spent parts of seven seasons on the American Hockey League (AHL) farm teams of those two organizations. He spent his first three seasons in the NHL in last place (Capitals 1974-75 and 1975-76, Red Wings 1976-77). After playing 365 National Hockey League (NHL) games over the course of those nine seasons, Joly played his final three years of professional hockey in the AHL. He is considered to have been a draft bust. Joly scored the last goal at Detroit’s Olympia Stadium.

Joly was born in Rocky Mountain House, Alberta.

== Career statistics ==
			Regular season					Playoffs
Season	Team	League	GP	G	A	Pts	PIM	GP	G	A	Pts	PIM
1971–72	Regina Pats	WCJHL	67	6	38	44	41	15	0	3	3	10
1972–73	Regina Pats	WCJHL	67	14	54	68	94	4	0	3	3	4
1973–74	Regina Pats	WCJHL	67	21	71	92	103	16	7	13	20	8
1973–74	Regina Pats	M-Cup	—	—	—	—	—	3	2	3	5	4
1974–75	Washington Capitals	NHL	44	1	7	8	44	—	—	—	—	—
1975–76	Richmond Robins	AHL	3	3	2	5	4	—	—	—	—	—
1975–76	Washington Capitals	NHL	54	8	17	25	28	—	—	—	—	—
1976–77	Springfield Indians	AHL	22	0	8	8	16	—	—	—	—	—
1976–77	Detroit Red Wings	NHL	53	1	11	12	14	—	—	—	—	—
1977–78	Detroit Red Wings	NHL	79	7	20	27	73	5	0	0	0	8
1978–79	Detroit Red Wings	NHL	20	0	4	4	6	—	—	—	—	—
1979–80	Adirondack Red Wings	AHL	8	3	3	6	10	—	—	—	—	—
1979–80	Detroit Red Wings	NHL	59	3	10	13	45	—	—	—	—	—
1980–81	Adirondack Red Wings	AHL	62	3	34	37	158	17	4	12	16	38
1980–81	Detroit Red Wings	NHL	17	0	2	2	10	—	—	—	—	—
1981–82	Adirondack Red Wings	AHL	36	3	22	25	59	—	—	—	—	—
1981–82	Detroit Red Wings	NHL	37	1	5	6	30	—	—	—	—	—
1982–83	Adirondack Red Wings	AHL	71	8	40	48	118	6	1	0	1	0
1982–83	Detroit Red Wings	NHL	2	0	0	0	0	—	—	—	—	—
1983–84	Adirondack Red Wings	AHL	78	10	33	43	133	7	0	1	1	19
1984–85	Adirondack Red Wings	AHL	76	9	40	49	111	—	—	—	—	—
1985–86	Adirondack Red Wings	AHL	65	0	22	22	68	16	0	4	4	38
NHL totals			365	21	76	97	250	5	0	0	0	8
AHL totals			421	39	204	243	677	46	5	17	22	95

== Awards ==
- WCHL All-Star Team – 1973 & 1974

Preceded by Denis Potvin	NHL first overall draft pick 1974	Succeeded by Mel Bridgman
Preceded by None	Washington Capitals first-round draft pick 1974	Succeeded by Alex Forsyth
