= Kamloops Chiefs =

- City: Kamloops, British Columbia
- League: Western Hockey League
- Operated: 1973–1977
- Home arena: Kamloops Memorial Arena

Franchise history
- 1971–1973: Vancouver Nats
- 1973–1977: Kamloops Chiefs
- 1977–1985: Seattle Breakers
- 1985–present: Seattle Thunderbirds

The Kamloops Chiefs were a junior ice hockey team based in Kamloops, British Columbia that played in the Western Canada Hockey League from 1973 to 1977. They were founded in 1971 as the Vancouver Nats, and relocated to Seattle, Washington to become the Seattle Breakers in 1977.

== Season-by-season record ==
Note: GP = Games played, W = Wins, L = Losses, T = Ties Pts = Points, GF = Goals for, GA = Goals against

Season	GP	W	L	T	GF	GA	Points	Finish	Playoffs
1973–74	68	13	49	6	248	376	32	6th West	Out of playoffs
1974–75	70	38	24	8	329	279	84	4th West	Lost quarter-final
1975–76	72	40	26	6	365	285	86	2nd West	Lost semi-final
1976–77	72	34	26	12	308	291	80	2nd West	Lost quarter-final

== NHL alumni ==
- Barry Beck
- Dan Clark
- Rob Flockhart
- Jamie Gallimore
- Brad Gassoff
- Reg Kerr
- Dwayne Lowdermilk
- Terry McDonald
- Barry Melrose
- Glenn Merkosky
- Andy Moog
- Larry Playfair
- Errol Rausse
- Rocky Saganiuk
- Mark Taylor
- Alec Tidey
- Ryan Walter
- Tim Watters

== See also ==
- List of ice hockey teams in British Columbia
- Kamloops Blazers
