= 1974 Memorial Cup =

Canadian junior men's ice hockey championship

Tournament details
- Venue(s): Stampede Corral (Calgary, Alberta)
- Dates: May 5–12, 1974
- Teams: 3

Final positions
- Champions: Regina Pats (WHL) (4th title)

The Memorial Cup trophy

The 1974 Memorial Cup occurred May 5–12 at the Stampede Corral in Calgary, Alberta. It was the 56th annual Memorial Cup competition, organized by the Canadian Amateur Hockey Association (CAHA) to determine the champion of major junior A ice hockey. Participating teams were the winners of the Ontario Hockey Association, Quebec Major Junior Hockey League and Western Hockey League which were the St. Catharines Black Hawks, Quebec Remparts and Regina Pats. Regina won their 4th Memorial Cup, defeating Quebec in the final game.

== Teams ==
QMJHL Team OHA Team WCHL Team Host City

=== Quebec Remparts ===
The Quebec Remparts represented the Quebec Major Junior Hockey League at the 1974 Memorial Cup. The Remparts had a very strong season in 1973-74, finishing in second place in the East Division with a 52-16-2 record, earning 106 points. In an unusually high scoring season, the Remparts scored 531 goals, which ranked second in the league. Quebec allowed 314 goals, which was the second fewest in the QMJHL. In the post-season, the Remparts swept the Shawinigan Dynamos in the QMJHL quarter-finals, winning the series in four games. Quebec then defeated the Laval National four games to two in the QMJHL semi-finals, setting up a matchup against the league leading Sorel Éperviers in the finals. The Remparts defeated Sorel four games to two in the QMJHL finals, winning the President's Cup and earning a berth at the 1974 Memorial Cup.

The high-scoring Remparts were led offensively by Real Cloutier, who scored 93 goals and a team high 216 points in 69 games. Cloutier emerged as a top prospect for the upcoming 1974 WHA Amateur Draft, and would be drafted ninth overall by the Quebec Nordiques. In the post-season, Cloutier scored a league high 26 goals, and added 24 assists for 50 points in 16 games. Jacques Locas scored a team high 99 goals as he also broke the 200 point plateau, as Locas had 206 points in 63 games. Locas finished with a league high 51 points in 16 playoff games. Rich Nantais narrowly missed reaching 200 points, as he scored 64 goals and 194 points in 67 games. Daniel Beaulieu scored 45 goals and 104 points in 70 games, as Quebec had five players with 100+ points during the season. Michel Lachance scored nine goals and 72 points in 70 games to lead the defense in scoring. The Remparts goaltending duties were split up between Michel Corcoran and Maurice Barrette.

The 1974 Memorial Cup was the Remparts second consecutive appearance at the tournament. In 1973, the Remparts lost in the final game to the Toronto Marlboros. Quebec also appeared at the 1971 Memorial Cup, which they won over the Edmonton Oil Kings.

=== Regina Pats ===
The Regina Pats represented the Western Canada Hockey League at the 1974 Memorial Cup. The Pats finished the 1973-74 with the best record in the league, with a 43-14-11 record, earning 97 points. Regina won the Scotty Munro Memorial Trophy for their regular season success. The Pats were a high scoring team, leading the WCHL with 377 goals. They were also the best defensive team in the league, allowing a league low 225 goals. In the post-season, Regina defeated the Saskatoon Blades four games to two in the East Division semi-finals. In the East Division finals, the Pats beat the Swift Current Broncos four games to two, earning the right to compete for the WCHL championship. In the final round, Regina swept the Calgary Centennials in four games, capturing the President's Cup and a berth into the 1974 Memorial Cup.

The Pats offensive was led by Dennis Sobchuk, who finished second in WCHL scoring with 68 goals and 146 points in 66 games. Sobchuk led the Pats in post-season scoring, scoring 10 goals and 31 points in 16 playoff games. Top prospect Clark Gillies scored 46 goals and 112 points in 65 games. Gillies would later be drafted with the fourth overall pick by the New York Islanders at the 1974 NHL entry draft. Defenseman Greg Joly, known as the best prospect since Bobby Orr, scored 21 goals and 92 points in 67 games during the season. Joly would become the first overall pick in the 1974 NHL entry draft by the Washington Capitals. In goal, Ed Staniowski played a majority of the games. He finished the season with a 39-12-9 record with a 3.00 GAA and a .905 save percentage.

The 1974 Memorial Cup would be the Pats thirteenth appearance. The team had previously won the Memorial Cup in 1925, 1928 and 1930.

=== St. Catharines Black Hawks ===
The St. Catharines Black Hawks represented the Ontario Hockey Association at the 1974 Memorial Cup. The Black Hawks finished in second place in the OHA during the 1973-74 season with a 41-23-6 record, earning 88 points. St. Catharines scored the second most goals in the league with 358 goals, while the club allowed 278 goals, which ranked them in seventh. In the post-season, the Black Hawks cruised to a nine points to one victory over the Oshawa Generals in the OHA quarter-finals. In the OHA semi-finals, St. Catharines swept the defending champion Toronto Marlboros eight points to zero. In the final round against the Peterborough Petes, the Black Hawks easily defeated the Petes nine points to one to win the J. Ross Robertson Cup and earn a berth into the 1974 Memorial Cup.

The Black Hawks were led by Rick Adduono, who finished in a tie for the league lead in points, winning the Eddie Powers Memorial Trophy. Adduono scored 51 goals and 135 points in 70 games. Dave Gorman scored 53 goals and 129 points in 69 games, winning the Jim Mahon Memorial Trophy, awarded to the highest scoring right winger in the OHA. Gorman followed up with six goals and 31 points in 14 post-season games. Wilf Paiement scored 50 goals and 123 points in 70 games as he was one of the top ranked prospects heading into the 1974 NHL entry draft. Paiement would be selected second overall by the Kansas City Scouts. Dave Salvian narrowly missed out on the 100 point club, as he scored 36 goals and 97 points in 67 games. Defenseman Rick Hampton led the Black Hawks defense, scoring 25 goals and 50 points in 65 games. Hampton would be selected third overall in the 1974 NHL entry draft by the California Seals. Bill Cheropita was the Black Hawks starting goaltender.

The 1974 Memorial Cup was the third appearance by the Black Hawks franchise at the Memorial Cup. The St. Catharines Teepees won the cup in 1954 and 1960.

== Round-robin standings ==
Pos	Team	Pld	W	L	GF	GA	
1	Regina Pats (WHL)	2	1	1	7	5	Advanced to final
2	Quebec Remparts (QMJHL)	2	1	1	6	7	Advanced to final
3	St. Catharines Black Hawks (OHA)	2	1	1	4	5	

== Scores ==
Round-robin

- May 5 St. Catharines 4-1 Quebec
- May 6 Regina 4-0 St. Catharines
- May 8 Quebec 5-3 Regina

Semi-Final

- May 10 Quebec 11-3 St. Catharines

Final

- May 12 Regina 7-4 Quebec

== Winning roster ==
Bill Bell, Glen Burdon, Drew Callander, Dave Faulkner, Clark Gillies, Jon Hammond, Mike Harazny, Greg Joly, Rob Laird, Bob Leslie, Kim McDougal, Jim Minor, Dennis Sobchuk, Dave Thomas, Rob Tudor, Ed Staniowski, Rick Uhrich, Mike Wanchuk, Mike Wirchowski. Coach: Bob Turner

== Award winners ==
- Stafford Smythe Memorial Trophy (MVP): Greg Joly, Regina
- George Parsons Trophy (Sportsmanship): Guy Chouinard, Quebec
