= 1975 World Junior Ice Hockey Championships =

1975 IIHF World Junior Championship
Tournament details
- Host countries: Canada; United States
- Venues: 5 (in 5 host cities)
- Dates: December 27, 1974 – January 5, 1975
- Teams: 6

Final positions
- Champions: Soviet Union
- Runners-up: Canada
- Third place: Sweden
- Fourth place: Czechoslovakia

Tournament statistics
- Games played: 15
- Goals scored: 95 (6.33 per game)
- Scoring leader(s): (Soviet Union) Boris Chuchin (Sweden) Dag Bredberg (8 points)

The 1975 World Junior Ice Hockey Championships were between December 26, 1974, and January 5, 1975, in several venues in Winnipeg and Brandon in Canada and in Minneapolis, Bloomington, and Fargo in the United States. The Soviet team won the tournament with a perfect 5–0 record. This was the second edition of the Ice Hockey World Junior Championship, but the results are not included in official IIHF records. Canada was represented by an all-star team from just the Western Canada Hockey League, while the other five nations were represented by teams of all their top under-20 players.

== Final standings ==
The tournament was a round-robin format, with each team playing each of the other five teams once each.

Pos	Team	Pld	W	L	D	GF	GA	GD	Pts
1	Soviet Union	5	5	0	0	22	8	+14	10
2	Canada	5	4	1	0	27	10	+17	8
3	Sweden	5	2	2	1	18	24	−6	5
4	Czechoslovakia	5	1	2	2	9	11	−2	4
5	Finland	5	1	3	1	10	14	−4	3
6	United States	5	0	5	0	9	28	−19	0

Source: HockeyCanada

== Results ==
Finland	1 – 4	Soviet Union

Canada	10 – 2 (2–0, 6–1, 2–1)	Sweden

Czechoslovakia	1 – 1	Finland

Canada	9 – 3	United States

Soviet Union	5 – 1 (2–0, 3–1, 0–0)	Czechoslovakia

Sweden	7 – 3 (2–0, 1–1, 4–2)	United States

Canada	2 – 1	Finland

Canada	3 – 0 (2–0, 0–0, 1–0)	Czechoslovakia

Soviet Union	3 – 1 (1–0, 2–1, 0–0)	United States

Sweden	5 – 3 (3–2, 0–0, 2–1)	Finland

Soviet Union	6 – 2 (0–0, 2–2, 4–0)	Sweden

United States	0 – 5	Czechoslovakia

Canada	3 – 4 (1–2, 0–2, 2–0)	Soviet Union

Finland	4 – 2	United States

Sweden	2 – 2 (1–1, 0–1, 1–0)	Czechoslovakia

== Scoring leaders ==
Rank	Player	Country	G	A	Pts
1	Boris Chuchin	Soviet Union	4	4	8
1	Dag Bredberg	Sweden	4	4	8
3	Dale McMullin	Canada	3	5	8
4	Vladimir Kucherenko	Soviet Union	0	8	8
5	Emil Meszáros	Sweden	4	3	7
6	Kent Nilsson	Sweden	4	2	6
6	Bryan Trottier	Canada	4	2	6
8	Mel Bridgman	Canada	4	1	5
8	Viktor Khatulev	Soviet Union	4	1	5
10	Mark Davidson	Canada	3	2	5
10	Peter Šťastný	Czechoslovakia	3	2	5
10	Matti Hagman	Finland	3	2	5

== Tournament awards ==
	Best Players	All-Star Team
Goaltender	(Canada) Ed Staniowski	(Soviet Union) Vladimir Myshkin
Defencemen	(Soviet Union) Sergei Babinov	(Canada) Richard Lapointe (Soviet Union) Viktor Kucherenko
Forwards	(Soviet Union) Viktor Khatulev	(Canada) Dale McMullin (Soviet Union) Viktor Khatulev (Soviet Union) Boris Alexandrov
