= Ron Robison =

Canadian ice hockey executive (born 1955)

- Born: 1955 (age 70–71); Indian Head, Saskatchewan, Canada
- Education: University of Saskatchewan
- Known for: Western Hockey League commissioner (2000–2024)

Ron Robison (born 1955) is a Canadian former ice hockey executive, who was the Western Hockey League (WHL) commissioner from 2000 to 2024. He previously worked in senior managerial roles for the Canadian Hockey Association and Hockey Canada. As commissioner, Robison has expanded the WHL by introducing new teams and broadcasting partners.

== Early life ==
Robison was born to parents Allan Robison and Elinor Anderson in 1955. His grandfather Jim was the mayor of Indian Head, Saskatchewan and ran a general store. Robison attended, and played ice hockey, at the University of Saskatchewan before graduating in 1977. In 2007, he was honoured by the University as one of their 100 Alumni of Influence.

== Career ==
=== Early career ===
After graduation, Robison was hired as an assistant coach for the Saskatchewan Huskies and faculty member of the Physical Education department until 1981. From there, Robison joined the Canadian Hockey Association, which later became known as Hockey Canada. In June 1997, Robison resigned as senior vice-president of Hockey Canada's Business Operations but continued to work for the association on a contract basis. During his years with Hockey Canada and the Canadian Hockey Association, Robison helped manage seven Ice Hockey World Championships and three Winter Olympic Games.

=== WHL ===
In September 2000, Robison was named the commissioner of the Western Hockey League (WHL), replacing Dev Dley. Five years later, Robison helped introduce a new team in British Columbia and the sale of the Tri-City Americans. He also partnered with the Canada West Universities Athletic Association to add new scholarship programs for players in the WHL and sat on the National Junior Team Policy Committee and Branch. As well, he helped the WHL and Interactive Netcasting Systems Incorporated begin to webcast WHL games starting in the 2005–06 season.

In 2006, under Robison's watch, the WHL expanded to include a new team in Edmonton, and his contract was extended for three more years. The following year, Robison and the WHL extended their partnership agreement the Saskatchewan Hockey Association to continue providing additional support for the Saskatchewan Hockey Association, the Saskatchewan Junior Hockey League, the Saskatchewan Midget AAA Hockey League under the Saskatchewan Development Model. The model was created to encourage the development of ice hockey players in Saskatchewan. Two years later, Robison continue expanding WHL's broadcasting rights by encouraging Shaw TV to sign a five-year contract with the WHL. The contract allowed Shaw TV to cover the WHL regular season and playoff games across Western Canada.

In 2011, Robison's contract was extended for five years through a unanimous vote by the WHL Board of Governors. He was later appointed to Hockey Canada's 2012–13 Governing Board and Program of Excellence Policy Committee.

In 2015, Robison introduced the "WHL Player Impact Program" to address challenges player might face such as mental health issues and drug abuse problems. He also personally collaborated with Athabasca University to create a hockey executive Master of Business Administration program. The following year, the WHL Board of Governors extended his contract until the 2021 season.

Robison retired on February 15, 2024, and was succeeded by Dan Near.
