= 1973–74 WCHL season =

Junior ice hockey season

- League: Western Hockey League
- Sport: Ice hockey
- Teams: 12

Regular season
- Season champions: Regina Pats (1)
- Season MVP: Ron Chipperfield (Brandon Wheat Kings)
- Top scorer: Ron Chipperfield (Brandon Wheat Kings)

Playoffs
- Finals champions: Regina Pats (1)
- Runners-up: Calgary Centennials

WHL seasons
- 1972–73 1974–75

1973–74 Canadian major junior season
- Sport: Ice hockey
- Teams: 34

OHA

QMJHL

WCHL

Memorial Cup
- Finals champions: Regina Pats (WCHL) (4th title)
- Runners-up: Quebec Remparts (QMJHL)

The 1973–74 WCHL season was the eighth season of the Western Canada Hockey League (WCHL). It featured twelve teams and a 68-game regular season. The Regina Pats topped the season's standings with 43 wins, and in the playoffs went on to win the team's first President's Cup, defeating the Calgary Centennials in the championship series. The win earned the Pats a berth in the 1974 Memorial Cup tournament, and Regina would go on to win its first Memorial Cup since 1930. This was the first Memorial Cup title for a team representing the WCHL.

The season was the first for the Kamloops Chiefs after the Vancouver Nats relocated to Kamloops prior to the season. The Winnipeg Jets also opted to change their name to the Winnipeg Clubs, mitigating confusion caused by the 1972 arrival of the professional World Hockey Association Jets.

== Team changes ==
- The Winnipeg Jets are renamed the Winnipeg Clubs.
- The Vancouver Nats relocate to Kamloops, British Columbia, becoming the Kamloops Chiefs.

== Regular season ==
=== Final standings ===
East Division
Pos	Team	Pld	W	L	T	GF	GA	Pts
1	x – Regina Pats	68	43	14	11	377	225	97
2	x – Flin Flon Bombers	68	34	21	13	322	259	81
3	x – Swift Current Broncos	68	35	24	9	240	306	79
4	x – Saskatoon Blades	68	30	29	9	283	272	69
5	Brandon Wheat Kings	68	27	37	4	305	348	58
6	Winnipeg Clubs	68	23	38	7	258	338	53

x – qualified for playoffs

West Division
Pos	Team	Pld	W	L	T	GF	GA	Pts
1	x – Calgary Centennials	68	41	18	9	328	236	91
2	x – New Westminster Bruins	68	36	21	11	284	250	83
3	x – Medicine Hat Tigers	68	29	31	8	305	314	66
4	x – Edmonton Oil Kings	68	25	36	7	252	301	57
5	Victoria Cougars	68	22	40	6	259	336	50
6	Kamloops Chiefs	68	13	49	6	248	376	32

x – qualified for playoffs

=== Scoring leaders ===
Note: GP = Games played; G = Goals; A = Assists; Pts = Points; PIM = Penalties in minutes

Player	Team	GP	G	A	Pts	PIM
Ron Chipperfield	Brandon Wheat Kings	66	90	72	162	82
Dennis Sobchuk	Regina Pats	66	68	78	146	78
Mike Rogers	Calgary Centennials	66	67	73	140	32
Al Hiller	Flin Flon Bombers	68	30	108	138	33
Terry Ruskowski	Swift Current Broncos	68	40	93	133	243
Rick Blight	Brandon Wheat Kings	67	49	81	130	122
Danny Gare	Calgary Centennials	65	68	59	127	238
Jerry Holland	Calgary Centennials	67	55	65	120	54
Ed Johnstone	Medicine Hat Tigers	68	64	54	118	164
Clark Gillies	Regina Pats	65	46	66	112	179

== 1974 WCHL Playoffs ==
=== League quarter-finals ===
- Swift Current defeated Flin Flon 4 games to 3
- Regina defeated Saskatoon 4 games to 2
- New Westminster defeated Medicine Hat 4 games to 2
- Calgary defeated Edmonton 4 games to 1

=== League semi-finals ===
- Regina defeated Swift Current 4 games to 2
- Calgary defeated New Westminster 4 games to 1

=== WHL Championship ===
- Regina defeated Calgary 4 games to 0

== All-Star game ==
On January 29, the West All-Stars defeated the East All-Stars 6–5 at Edmonton, Alberta in front of a crowd of 2,471.

== WHL awards ==
Most Valuable Player: Ron Chipperfield, Brandon Wheat Kings
Top Scorer: Ron Chipperfield, Brandon Wheat Kings
Most Sportsmanlike Player: Mike Rogers, Calgary Centennials
Top Defenseman: Pat Price, Saskatoon Blades
Rookie of the Year: Cam Connor, Flin Flon Bombers
Top Goaltender: Garth Malarchuk, Calgary Centennials
Coach of the Year: Stan Dunn, Swift Current Broncos
Regular season champions: Regina Pats

== All-Star Team ==
- Goaltender: Larry Hendrick, Edmonton Oil Kings
- Defenseman: Pat Price, Saskatoon Blades
- Defenseman: Ron Greschner, New Westminster Bruins & Greg Joly, Regina Pats (tied)
- Centerman: Ron Chipperfield, Brandon Wheat Kings & Dennis Sobchuk, Regina Pats (tied)
- Left Winger: Clark Gillies, Regina Pats
- Right Winger: Danny Gare, Calgary Centennials

== See also ==
- 1974 NHL entry draft
- 1973 in sports
- 1974 in sports

Preceded by 1972–73 WCHL season	WHL seasons	Succeeded by 1974–75 WCHL season
