= Vancouver Nats =

- City: Vancouver, British Columbia
- League: Western Hockey League
- Operated: 1971–73
- Home arena: Pacific Coliseum

Franchise history
- 1971–73: Vancouver Nats
- 1973–77: Kamloops Chiefs
- 1977–85: Seattle Breakers
- 1985-Present: Seattle Thunderbirds

The Vancouver Nats were a major junior ice hockey team based in Vancouver, British Columbia that played two seasons in the Western Canada Hockey League from 1971 to 1973. The team relocated in 1973 to Kamloops to become the Kamloops Chiefs before settling in Seattle as the Seattle Breakers (later Thunderbirds) in 1977.

On the ice, the Nats finished last overall in the league both years, winning just 27 games in their two years. After their demise, it would be nearly thirty years before the WHL would return to the city of Vancouver, with the Vancouver Giants established as an expansion team in 2001.

== Season-by-season record ==
Note: GP = Games played, W = Wins, L = Losses, T = Ties Pts = Points, GF = Goals for, GA = Goals against

Season	GP	W	L	T	GF	GA	Points	Finish	Playoffs
1971–72	68	17	50	1	213	379	35	6th West	Out of playoffs
1972–73	68	10	55	3	198	428	23	6th West	Out of playoffs

== NHL alumni ==
- Jim Atamanenko
- Bruce Greig
- Dale Lewis
- Brian Ogilvie
- Barry Smith

== See also ==
- List of ice hockey teams in British Columbia
