= 1974–75 WCHL season =

Junior ice hockey season

- League: Western Hockey League
- Sport: Ice hockey
- Teams: 12

Regular season
- Season champions: Victoria Cougars (1)
- Season MVP: Bryan Trottier (Lethbridge Broncos)
- Top scorer: Mel Bridgman (Victoria Cougars)

Playoffs
- Finals champions: New Westminster Bruins (1)
- Runners-up: Saskatoon Blades

WHL seasons
- 1973–74 1975–76

1974–75 Canadian major junior season
- Sport: Ice hockey
- Teams: 33

OMJHL

QMJHL

WCHL

Memorial Cup
- Finals champions: Toronto Marlboros (OMJHL) (7th title)
- Runners-up: New Westminster Bruins (WCHL)

The 1974–75 WCHL season was the ninth season of the Western Canada Hockey League (WCHL). It featured twelve teams playing a 70-game regular season, an increase from 68. The Victoria Cougars topped the regular season standings with 47 wins. In the playoffs, the New Westminster Bruins defeated the Saskatoon Blades in a seven-game championship series to win the President's Cup. With the win, the Bruins earned a berth at the 1975 Memorial Cup tournament, in which they lost the final to the Toronto Marlboros, who captured their record seventh national title.

The season was the first for the Lethbridge Broncos, after the Swift Current Broncos relocated prior to the season.

== League notes ==
- During the 1975 Memorial Cup tournament, officials from the WCHL and the other two Canadian major junior leagues—the Ontario Major Junior Hockey League and the Quebec Major Junior Hockey League—announced the formation of the Canadian Major Junior Hockey League as an umbrella organization for major junior hockey.

== Team changes ==
- The Swift Current Broncos relocate to Lethbridge, Alberta, becoming the Lethbridge Broncos.

== Regular season ==
=== Final standings ===
East Division
Pos	Team	Pld	W	L	T	GF	GA	Pts
1	x – Saskatoon Blades	70	38	22	10	344	244	86
2	x – Lethbridge Broncos	70	28	32	10	302	315	66
3	x – Regina Pats	70	29	36	5	260	288	63
4	x – Brandon Wheat Kings	70	24	35	11	276	320	59
5	Winnipeg Clubs	70	23	35	12	265	366	58
6	Flin Flon Bombers	70	19	42	9	262	389	47

x – qualified for playoffs

West Division
Pos	Team	Pld	W	L	T	GF	GA	Pts
1	x – Victoria Cougars	70	47	18	5	416	257	99
2	x – Medicine Hat Tigers	70	40	22	8	380	291	88
3	x – New Westminster Bruins	70	37	22	11	319	260	85
4	x – Kamloops Chiefs	70	38	24	8	327	279	84
5	Edmonton Oil Kings	70	34	29	7	340	321	75
6	Calgary Centennials	70	11	51	8	236	399	30

x – qualified for playoffs

=== Scoring leaders ===
Note: GP = Games played; G = Goals; A = Assists; Pts = Points; PIM = Penalties in minutes

Player	Team	GP	G	A	Pts	PIM
Mel Bridgman	Victoria Cougars	66	66	91	157	175
Bryan Trottier	Lethbridge Broncos	67	46	98	144	103
Don Murdoch	Medicine Hat Tigers	70	82	59	141	83
Dave Faulkner	Regina Pats	70	56	66	122	59
Don Ashby	Calgary Centennials	70	52	68	120	71
Rich Gosselin	Flin Flon Bombers	70	47	69	116	83
Peter Morris	Victoria Cougars	70	43	72	115	173
Barry Dean	Medicine Hat Tigers	64	40	75	115	173
Danny Lucas	Victoria Cougars	70	57	56	113	74
Rick Blight	Brandon Wheat Kings	65	60	52	112	65
Greg Miazga	Victoria Cougars	70	14	28	42	117

== 1975 WCHL Playoffs ==
=== League quarter-finals ===
- Saskatoon defeated Brandon 4 games to 1
- Regina defeated Lethbridge 4 games to 2
- New Westminster defeated Medicine Hat 4 games to 1
- Victoria defeated Kamloops 4 games to 2

=== League semi-finals ===
- Saskatoon defeated Regina 4 games to 1
- New Westminster defeated Victoria 4 games to 2

=== WHL Championship ===
- New Westminster defeated Saskatoon 4 games to 3

== All-Star game ==
On January 15, the West All-Stars defeated the East All-Stars 4–1 at Victoria, British Columbia in front of a crowd of 3,452.

== WHL awards ==
Most Valuable Player: Bryan Trottier, Lethbridge Broncos
Top Scorer: Mel Bridgman, Victoria Cougars
Most Sportsmanlike Player: Danny Arndt, Saskatoon Blades
Top Defenseman: Rick Lapointe, Victoria Cougars
Rookie of the Year: Don Murdoch, Medicine Hat Tigers
Top Goaltender: Bill Oleschuk, Saskatoon Blades
Coach of the Year: Pat Ginnell, Victoria Cougars
Regular season champions: Victoria Cougars

== All-Star Team ==
- Goaltender: Ed Staniowski, Regina Pats
- Defenseman: Rick Lapointe, Victoria Cougars
- Defenseman: Robin Sadler, Edmonton Oil Kings
- Centerman: Mel Bridgman, Victoria Cougars & Bryan Trottier, Lethbridge Broncos (tied)
- Left Winger: Barry Dean, Medicine Hat Tigers
- Right Winger: Don Murdoch, Medicine Hat Tigers

== See also ==
- 1975 NHL entry draft
- 1974 in sports
- 1975 in sports

Preceded by 1973–74 WCHL season	WHL seasons	Succeeded by 1975–76 WCHL season
