= 1972–73 WCHL season =

Junior ice hockey season

- League: Western Hockey League
- Sport: Ice hockey
- Teams: 12

Regular season
- Season champions: Saskatoon Blades (1)
- Season MVP: Dennis Sobchuk (Regina Pats)
- Top scorer: Tom Lysiak (Medicine Hat Tigers)

Playoffs
- Finals champions: Medicine Hat Tigers (1)
- Runners-up: Saskatoon Blades

WHL seasons
- 1971–72 1973–74

1972–73 Canadian major junior season
- Sport: Ice hockey
- Teams: 30

OHA

QMJHL

WCHL

Memorial Cup
- Finals champions: Toronto Marlboros (OHA) (6th title)
- Runners-up: Quebec Remparts (QMJHL)

The 1972–73 WCHL season was the seventh season of the Western Canada Hockey League (WCHL). It featured twelve teams and a 68-game regular season. The Saskatoon Blades topped the regular season standings with 46 wins. However, in the playoffs, the Medicine Hat Tigers defeated the Blades in the championship series to win the club's first President's Cup title.

== Regular season ==
=== Final standings ===
East Division
Pos	Team	Pld	W	L	T	GF	GA	Pts
1	x – Saskatoon Blades	68	46	11	11	323	184	103
2	x – Flin Flon Bombers	68	39	19	10	334	228	88
3	x – Regina Pats	68	30	28	10	294	270	70
4	x – Brandon Wheat Kings	68	29	30	9	307	304	67
5	Swift Current Broncos	68	27	35	6	300	359	60
6	Winnipeg Jets	68	16	42	10	288	372	42

x – qualified for playoffs

West Division
Pos	Team	Pld	W	L	T	GF	GA	Pts
1	x – Edmonton Oil Kings	68	40	20	8	311	240	88
2	x – Medicine Hat Tigers	68	39	20	9	348	254	87
3	x – Calgary Centennials	68	35	22	11	302	224	81
4	x – New Westminster Bruins	68	31	22	15	283	264	77
5	Victoria Cougars	68	13	51	4	231	390	30
6	Vancouver Nats	68	10	55	3	198	428	23

x – qualified for playoffs

=== Scoring leaders ===
Note: GP = Games played; G = Goals; A = Assists; Pts = Points; PIM = Penalties in minutes

Player	Team	GP	G	A	Pts	PIM
Tom Lysiak	Medicine Hat Tigers	67	58	96	154	104
Dennis Sobchuk	Regina Pats	66	67	80	147	128
Lanny McDonald	Medicine Hat Tigers	68	62	77	139	84
Darcy Rota	Edmonton Oil Kings	68	73	56	129	104
Blaine Stoughton	Flin Flon Bombers	68	58	60	118	86
Wayne Bianchin	Flin Flon Bombers	68	60	54	114	90
Ron Chipperfield	Brandon Wheat Kings	59	72	41	113	63
Vick Mercredi	New Westminster Bruins	67	52	61	113	63
Mike Rogers	Calgary Centennials	67	54	58	112	44
Boyd Anderson	Medicine Hat Tigers	68	48	64	112	52

== 1973 WCHL Playoffs ==
=== Quarterfinals ===
- Saskatoon defeated Brandon 4 games to 2
- Flin Flon defeated Regina 4 games to 0
- Edmonton defeated New Westminster 4 games to 1
- Medicine Hat defeated Calgary 4 games to 2

=== Semifinals ===
- Saskatoon defeated Flin Flon 4 games to 1
- Medicine Hat defeated Edmonton 4 games to 2

=== Finals ===
- Medicine Hat defeated Saskatoon 3 games to 0 with 2 ties

== All-Star game ==
The 1972–73 WCHL All-Star Game was held in Medicine Hat, Alberta, with the West Division All-Stars defeating the East Division All-Stars 6–1 before a crowd of 5,336.

== Awards ==
Most Valuable Player: Dennis Sobchuk, Regina Pats
Top Scorer: Tom Lysiak, Medicine Hat Tigers
Most Sportsmanlike Player: Ron Chipperfield, Brandon Wheat Kings
Defenseman of the Year: George Pesut, Saskatoon Blades
Rookie of the Year: Rick Blight, Brandon Wheat Kings
Goaltender of the Year: Ed Humphreys, Saskatoon Blades
Coach of the Year: Pat Ginnell, Flin Flon Bombers
Regular Season Champions: Saskatoon Blades

== All-Star Team ==
- Goaltender: John Davidson, Calgary Centennials
- Defenseman: George Pesut, Saskatoon Blades
- Defenseman: Greg Joly, Regina Pats
- Centerman: Tom Lysiak, Medicine Hat Tigers
- Left Winger: Darcy Rota, Edmonton Oil Kings
- Right Winger: Lanny McDonald, Medicine Hat Tigers

== See also ==
- 1973 Memorial Cup
- 1972 in sports
- 1973 in sports

Preceded by 1971–72 WCHL season	WHL seasons	Succeeded by 1973–74 WCHL season
