= Western Hockey League =

Junior ice hockey league in North America

- Current season, competition or edition: 2026–27 WHL season
- Formerly: Canadian Major Junior Hockey League (1966–67); Western Canada Junior Hockey League (1967–68); Western Canada Hockey League (1968–1978)
- Sport: Ice hockey
- Founded: 1966
- Commissioner: Dan Near
- No. of teams: 23 (24 by 2027)
- Countries: Canada (17 teams); United States (6 teams)
- Headquarters: Calgary, Alberta
- Most recent champion: Everett Silvertips (1st title)
- Most titles: Kamloops Blazers & Medicine Hat Tigers (6)
- Broadcasters: Canada; TSN; RDS; CBC; United States; KRCW-TV; KZJO
- Streaming partner: YouTube
- Website: whl.ca

The Western Hockey League (WHL) is a junior ice hockey league based in Western Canada and the Northwestern United States. The WHL is one of three leagues that constitutes the Canadian Hockey League (CHL) as the highest level of junior hockey in Canada, alongside the Ontario Hockey League and Quebec Maritimes Junior Hockey League. Teams play for the Ed Chynoweth Cup, with the winner moving on to play for the Memorial Cup, Canada's national junior championship. WHL teams have won the Memorial Cup 19 times. The WHL is composed of 23 teams divided into two conferences of two divisions, each. The Eastern Conference comprises 11 teams from Manitoba, Saskatchewan, and Alberta, while the Western Conference comprises 12 teams from British Columbia, Washington, and Oregon. The league will expand to 24 teams by 2027 with the addition of a team in Chilliwack, British Columbia.

The league was founded in 1966 as the Canadian Major Junior Hockey League (CMJHL), with seven teams in Saskatchewan and Alberta. For its 1967 season, the league was renamed the Western Canada Junior Hockey League (WCJHL). From 1968, the league was renamed the Western Canada Hockey League (WCHL), and finally the Western Hockey League from 1978 after the admission of American-based teams to the league.

The league was the brainchild of Bill Hunter, who desired to build a western league capable of competing with the top leagues in Ontario and Quebec. He partnered with Scotty Munro, Del Wilson, and Jim Piggott to make this vision a reality. Originally considered an "outlaw league" by the Canadian Amateur Hockey Association, the western league was not sanctioned as a top junior league until 1970, when Canadian junior hockey was reorganized.

== History ==
=== Beginning ===
Despite winning the 1966 Memorial Cup, Edmonton Oil Kings' owner Bill Hunter was growing concerned about the state of junior hockey in Western Canada. Each of the West's four provinces had its own junior league, and Hunter felt that this put them at a disadvantage when competing nationally against larger leagues based in Ontario and Quebec. Desiring stronger competition, Hunter's Oil Kings were competing in both the Alberta Junior Hockey League and the senior Central Alberta Hockey League. During the 1966 Memorial Cup, Hunter made newspaper headlines when he outlined his vision for a nation-wide junior hockey league competing for the Memorial Cup. The Canadian Amateur Hockey Association's (CAHA) second vice-president Lloyd Pollock responded by saying that the idea was a pipe dream, and was not feasible while the CAHA was re-negotiating a development agreement with the National Hockey League (NHL).

CAHA informed the Oil Kings that they were required to play full-time in a junior hockey league for the 1966–67 season or would be ineligible to compete for the Memorial Cup. This led Hunter to endorse the suggestion of Estevan Bruins owner Scotty Munro to create a new Western regional junior league. Five members of the Saskatchewan Junior Hockey League (SJHL)—the Bruins, Moose Jaw Canucks, Regina Pats, Saskatoon Blades, and Weyburn Red Wings—left the SJHL and joined the Oil Kings and the Calgary Buffaloes in forming the Canadian Major Junior Hockey League (CMJHL). Despite concerns that the CMJHL would mean the demise of the Alberta and Saskatchewan leagues—the SJHL did immediately fold—the governing bodies in both provinces sanctioned the new league. However, CAHA did not sanction it, declaring the CMJHL to be an "outlaw league" and suspending its teams and players from participation in CAHA events, including the Memorial Cup. The new league accused CAHA of overstepping its boundaries and, with the support of the players and their families, chose to play the season regardless. The CMJHL began legal action against the CAHA executive in March 1967, fighting to regain eligibility to enter the Memorial Cup tournament.

In May 1967, the CMJHL renamed itself to the Western Canada Junior Hockey League (WCJHL). The league also added four new teams, including the Swift Current Broncos and three teams based in Manitoba—the Brandon Wheat Kings, Flin Flon Bombers, and Winnipeg Jets. The new CAHA-NHL development agreement came into effect July 1, 1967. The new pact ended direct sponsorship of junior teams by the NHL, which shifted to paying development fees to CAHA, with junior players becoming eligible for the NHL entry draft at age 20. With the agreement settled, CAHA finally sanctioned the WCHL, which allowed for the league champion Estevan Bruins to compete for the 1968 Memorial Cup. However, in May 1968, Hunter announced that the league would use an age limit of 21 in spite of the CAHA-NHL agreement. The WCJHL claimed that the lower age limit decreased its talent pool and negatively impacted ticket sales. In response, CAHA again suspended the league and its players.

In June 1968, the WCJHL changed its name to the Western Canada Hockey League (WCHL), and announced that it was leaving CAHA to form the rival Canadian Hockey Association (CHA). Hunter became chairman of the board for the WCHL, and Ron Butlin became president of the WCHL and the CHA. Concerns over the WCHL's relationship with CAHA and a desire to compete for the Memorial Cup led the Pats, Canucks, and Red Wings to withdraw before the 1968–69 season, and join a revived Saskatchewan Junior Hockey League instead. At the conclusion of the season, the CHA organized its own national championship, which pitted the WCHL-champion Flin Flon Bombers against the St. Thomas Barons from Ontario. The initiative was undermined when the Barons withdrew from the best-of-seven series during the fourth game in protest of alleged violent play on the part of the Bombers. The Bombers, who were awarded the title, proceeded to challenge the Memorial Cup champion-Montreal Junior Canadiens to a championship showdown, but the Montreal team declined.

After years of disputes, Canadian junior hockey was reorganized in 1970, with CAHA absorbing the CHA and re-sanctioning the WCHL, making it one of three top-flight major junior leagues, along with the Ontario Hockey Association—now the Ontario Hockey League—and the Quebec Major Junior Hockey League—now the Quebec Maritimes Junior Hockey League. Then, in 1972, the format of the Memorial Cup was changed to become a tournament between the champion of each major junior league.

League logo timeline

1968–1978

1978–2002

2002–present

=== Early years ===
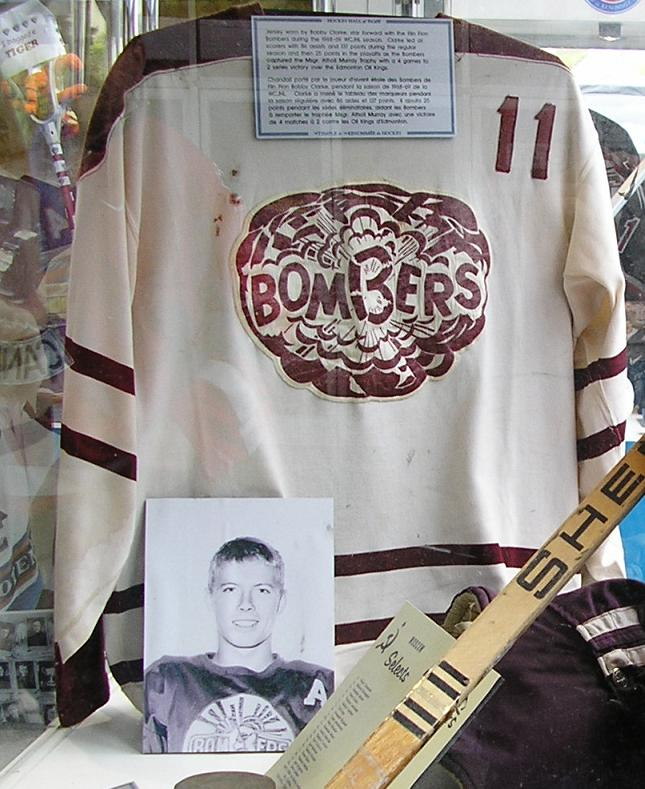
Bobby Clarke's Flin Flon Bombers jersey on display at the 2007 Memorial Cup in Vancouver

The league's first decade saw constant expansion and franchise movement as the league spread throughout the west. The Flin Flon Bombers, led by future NHL stars Bobby Clarke and Reggie Leach, became the league's first powerhouse team, making three straight finals appearances and winning back-to-back championships in 1969 and 1970. The WCHL became a truly western league in 1971 when the Estevan Bruins moved to British Columbia to become the New Westminster Bruins, joined by the expansion Victoria Cougars and Vancouver Nats.

In the mid-1970s, the Bruins established the WCHL's first true dynasty, capturing four consecutive championships between 1975 and 1978. The Bruins also won back-to-back Memorial Cup championships in 1977 and 1978.

In 1976, the Oil Kings, facing pressure from the professional Edmonton Oilers of the World Hockey Association, relocated to Oregon to become the Portland Winter Hawks, marking the WCHL's first American club. With the addition of two more American teams in the Seattle Breakers and Billings Bighorns a year later, the WCHL shortened its name to the Western Hockey League. Despite the Flin Flon Bombers' early success, the remoteness and size of the community increasingly posed a challenge, and in 1978 the team relocated to Edmonton in a brief revival of the Oil Kings—the team would move again a year later and become the Great Falls Americans.

=== The 1980s ===
The 1980s were marked by several brawls that involved police intervention, one of the most bizarre trades in hockey history, and the tragic deaths of four players in a bus crash.

Early in the 1980–81 WHL season, Medicine Hat Tigers manager and coach Pat Ginnell traded blows with a linesman during a bench clearing brawl against the Lethbridge Broncos. Ginnell was found guilty of assault, fined $360, and suspended for 36 games by the WHL. In March 1982, a violent brawl between the Regina Pats and Calgary Wranglers saw the two teams collectively fined $2,250 and players suspended for 73 combined games. Pats coach Bill LaForge would end up in a courtroom later that season when he got into an altercation with a fan. LaForge was acquitted when the judge noted that it was hard to convict a man for assault when faced with "an obnoxious person trying to get into the coach's area." LaForge resigned following the season after serving three separate suspensions.

On January 19, 1983, the Seattle Breakers dealt Tom Martin and $35,000 to the Victoria Cougars for the Cougars' team bus. The Breakers had been unable to sign Martin, who wanted to play in his home town of Victoria, and the Cougars were unable to use the bus, which they had purchased from the folded Spokane Flyers, because they were unwilling to pay the taxes and duties required to register the vehicle in Canada.

On December 30, 1986, tragedy struck the Swift Current Broncos when their bus slid off an icy highway and rolled on the way to Regina for a game. Scott Kruger, Trent Kresse, Brent Ruff, and Chris Mantyka were killed in the crash. The Broncos retired their numbers and introduced a commemorative patch in remembrance of the four players; in 2016, a memorial was unveiled at the crash site. The WHL later renamed its award for most valuable player as the Four Broncos Memorial Trophy in their honour. In 1989, less than three years after the crash, the Broncos won the league title and the Memorial Cup.

=== The 1990s ===
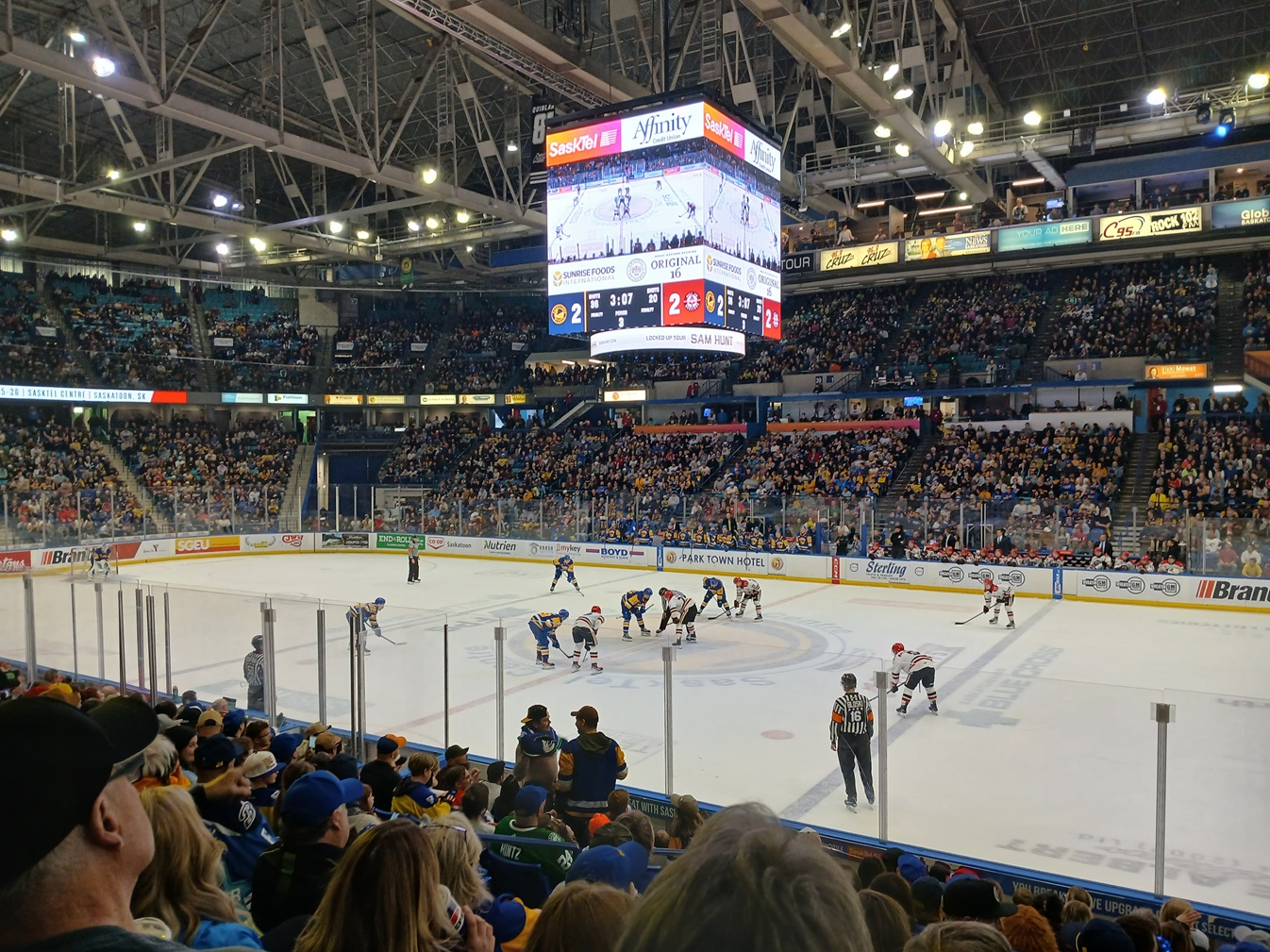
The Moose Jaw Warriors in action against the Saskatoon Blades

The 1990s saw another period of expansion and the return of the league to Western Canada's major cities. In 1991, the Spokane Chiefs became the second American team to win the Memorial Cup. The Kamloops Blazers established themselves as the WHL's second dynasty when they won both the WHL Championship and Memorial Cup three times in four years between 1992 and 1995.

In 1995, the Calgary Hitmen, founded by a group of investors including Bret "the Hitman" Hart, from whom the team got its name, were granted an expansion franchise. Despite early fears that the WHL could not succeed in an NHL city, the Hitmen were a success, averaging as many as 10,000 fans per game by 2004–05. The Hitmen were followed one year later by the Edmonton Ice, but that team failed after only two seasons because of conflicts with the Edmonton Oilers. The team became the Kootenay Ice in Cranbrook, British Columbia, and found better success—including winning the 2002 Memorial Cup—despite being in one of the smallest markets in the league.

=== The 21st century ===
In the 2000s, the league expanded four more times. The Vancouver Giants joined in 2001, the Everett Silvertips in 2003, the Chilliwack Bruins in 2005—the team relocated in 2011 and became the Victoria Royals—and the Edmonton Oil Kings in 2007. The Kelowna Rockets established a run of dominance, winning three WHL titles in 2003, 2005, and 2009, and winning the Memorial Cup as host in 2004.

2011 saw WHL teams participate in two outdoor games for the first time. The Spokane Chiefs hosted the Kootenay Ice on January 15, and on February 21, the Calgary Hitmen hosted the Regina Pats for a game in conjunction with the 2011 Heritage Classic. A third outdoor game was hosted by Regina as part of the 2019 Heritage Classic, featuring a rematch against the Hitmen.

The league was significantly disrupted by the COVID-19 pandemic, which emerged in North America in early 2020. The 2019–20 season was cut short and its playoffs ultimately cancelled due to the pandemic, while the 2020–21 season was played in a modified format, with teams playing 24-game in-division schedules with no playoffs. As such, neither the Ed Chynoweth Cup nor the Memorial Cup were awarded in 2020 or 2021. The league returned to a regular schedule for 2021–22, and the Oil Kings became the first team to win the Ed Chynoweth Cup since the Prince Albert Raiders in 2019. The league added a sixth team in British Columbia in 2025 with the Penticton Vees, while pursuing a new team in Chilliwack.

The decision of the American National Collegiate Athletic Association (NCAA) in 2024 to open eligibility to CHL players shifted the landscape of major junior hockey in Canada. Beginning in 2025, large numbers of college-aged WHL players committed to American universities, while the WHL saw an influx of Junior A prospects that formerly eschewed the league in order to retain NCAA eligibility.

== Teams ==
Location of WHL teams as of 2025–26 season

The WHL comprises 23 teams divided into two conferences, making it the largest league in the CHL—the Ontario Hockey League has 20 teams and the Quebec Maritimes Junior Hockey League has 18. The WHL has member teams across four Canadian provinces and two American states. The Eastern Conference comprises teams from Manitoba, Saskatchewan, and Alberta. The Western Conference is made up of teams based in British Columbia, Washington, and Oregon.

The top eight teams in each conference qualify for the playoffs, with the division winners declared the top two seeds in the first round of the post-season. In the playoffs, the four remaining teams in each conference are reseeded by regular season points in the second round.

Eastern Conference
Division	Team	City	Arena	Founded	Joined
Central	Calgary Hitmen	Calgary, Alberta	Scotiabank Saddledome	1994	1995
Central	Edmonton Oil Kings	Edmonton, Alberta	Rogers Place	2006	2007
Central	Lethbridge Hurricanes	Lethbridge, Alberta	VisitLethbridge.com Arena	1967*	
Central	Medicine Hat Tigers	Medicine Hat, Alberta	Co-op Place	1970	
Central	Red Deer Rebels	Red Deer, Alberta	Marchant Crane Centrium	1991	1992
East	Brandon Wheat Kings	Brandon, Manitoba	Keystone Centre	1936	1967
East	Moose Jaw Warriors	Moose Jaw, Saskatchewan	Temple Gardens Centre	1980*	
East	Prince Albert Raiders	Prince Albert, Saskatchewan	Art Hauser Centre	1971	1982
East	Regina Pats	Regina, Saskatchewan	Brandt Centre	1917	1966
East	Saskatoon Blades	Saskatoon, Saskatchewan	SaskTel Centre	1964	1966
East	Swift Current Broncos	Swift Current, Saskatchewan	InnovationPlex	1967*	

Western Conference
Division	Team	City	Arena	Founded	Joined
B.C.	Kamloops Blazers	Kamloops, British Columbia	Sandman Centre	1966*	
B.C.	Kelowna Rockets	Kelowna, British Columbia	Prospera Place	1991*	
B.C.	Penticton Vees	Penticton, British Columbia	South Okanagan Events Centre	2025	
B.C.	Prince George Cougars	Prince George, British Columbia	CN Centre	1962	1971*
B.C.	Vancouver Giants	Langley, British Columbia	Langley Events Centre	2001	
B.C.	Victoria Royals	Victoria, British Columbia	Save-On-Foods Memorial Centre	2005	2006*
U.S.	Everett Silvertips	Everett, Washington	Angel of the Winds Arena	2001	2003
U.S.	Portland Winterhawks	Portland, Oregon	Veterans Memorial Coliseum	1950	1966*
U.S.	Seattle Thunderbirds	Kent, Washington	accesso ShoWare Center	1971*	
U.S.	Spokane Chiefs	Spokane, Washington	Numerica Veterans Arena	1982*	
U.S.	Tri-City Americans	Kennewick, Washington	Toyota Center	1966*	
U.S.	Wenatchee Wild	Wenatchee, Washington	Town Toyota Center	1996*	

* Indicates franchise was relocated from original location

=== Future ===
Team	City	Arena	Founded	Joining
Chilliwack	Chilliwack, British Columbia	Chilliwack Coliseum	2025	2027

=== Franchise timeline ===
Note: Current teams are shown in dark blue, former teams in gray, and future teams in teal. Gold stars denote league championships.

=== Franchise histories ===
- Calgary Buffaloes (1966–67) → Calgary Centennials (1967–77) → Billings Bighorns (1977–82) → Nanaimo Islanders (1982–83) → New Westminster Bruins (1983–88) → Tri-City Americans (1988–present)
- Edmonton Oil Kings (1966–76) → Portland Winter Hawks (1976–2009) → Portland Winterhawks (2009–present)
- Estevan Bruins (1966–71) → New Westminster Bruins (1971–81) → Kamloops Junior Oilers (1981–84) → Kamloops Blazers (1984–present)
- Moose Jaw Canucks (1966–68)
- Regina Pats (1966–68, 1970–present)
- Saskatoon Blades (1966–present)
- Weyburn Red Wings (1966–68)
- Brandon Wheat Kings (1967–present)
- Flin Flon Bombers (1967–78) → Edmonton Oil Kings (1978–79) → Great Falls Americans (1979–80) → Spokane Flyers (1980–82)
- Swift Current Broncos (1967–74) → Lethbridge Broncos (1974–86) → Swift Current Broncos (1986–present)
- Winnipeg Jets (1967–73) → Winnipeg Clubs (1973–76) → Winnipeg Monarchs (1976–77) → Calgary Wranglers (1977–87) → Lethbridge Hurricanes (1987–present)
- Medicine Hat Tigers (1970–present)
- Vancouver Nats (1971–73) → Kamloops Chiefs (1973–77) → Seattle Breakers (1977–85) → Seattle Thunderbirds (1985–present)
- Victoria Cougars (1971–94) → Prince George Cougars (1994–present)
- Winnipeg Warriors (1980–84) → Moose Jaw Warriors (1984–present)
- Kelowna Wings (1982–85) → Spokane Chiefs (1985–present)
- Prince Albert Raiders (1982–present)
- Tacoma Rockets (1991–95) → Kelowna Rockets (1995–present)
- Red Deer Rebels (1992–present)
- Calgary Hitmen (1995–present)
- Edmonton Ice (1996–98) → Kootenay Ice (1998–2019) → Winnipeg Ice (2019–2023) → Wenatchee Wild (2023–present)
- Vancouver Giants (2001–present)
- Everett Silvertips (2003–present)
- Chilliwack Bruins (2006–11) → Victoria Royals (2011–present)
- Edmonton Oil Kings (2007–present)
- Penticton Vees (2025–present)

== Player eligibility ==
The WHL bantam draft is an annual event in which teams select players from bantam hockey league age groups (i.e. 14 or 15 years old). The order of selection depends on the league's standings.

Players aged 15 to 20 are eligible to play in the WHL, with some restrictions. 15-year-olds are permitted to play only five games, unless their midget team's season has ended. Meanwhile, each team is allowed to have only three 20-year-olds on their rosters, except for expansion teams, for which five 20-year-olds are eligible to play. Each team is permitted to carry only two non-North American players, and teams have the opportunity to select such players through the CHL Import Draft.

Each of the CHL's three member leagues are granted exclusive territorial rights to players from within North America. The WHL holds rights to players from the four western provinces, the American Pacific Northwest, all other American states west of the Mississippi River (except Missouri), and the Yukon, Northwest Territories, and Nunavut.

=== Exceptional status ===
In 2005, the CHL introduced exceptional status, which could be conferred on select players to make them eligible to play full-time in a CHL league as a 15-year-old. In 2020, Connor Bedard became the first player to be granted exceptional status to play in the WHL, and the seventh player overall to have been granted exceptional status since 2005. Bedard was selected by the Regina Pats in the 2020 bantam draft. In 2024, Landon DuPont became the second player to be granted exceptional status for the WHL, and the ninth overall. DuPont was selected by the Everett Silvertips in the 2024 bantam draft.

=== Education ===
With most players joining the league while still attending school, the WHL takes a role in its players' education. Teams maintain academic advisors, who monitor the academic progress of players along with the league's Director of Education Services. The league operates a scholarship program that offers one full year of Canadian university tuition, textbooks, and compulsory fees for each season played in the WHL. Since the program was introduced in 1993, more than 3,000 scholarships had been handed out at a total value of CA$9 million by 2008. Canadian universities and colleges thus recruit extensively from the WHL, affording graduating players the opportunity to continue playing hockey in U Sports competition as they attend post-secondary institutions.

Until 2024, the National Collegiate Athletic Association (NCAA) considered CHL players professionals—due both to the fact that they received stipends and that eligible players could sign National Hockey League contracts—and thus ineligible to participate in college hockey programs in the United States. Players hoping to receive scholarships to American universities thus had to play Junior A hockey in the British Columbia Hockey League or the United States Hockey League, rather than major junior hockey, to retain NCAA eligibility. However, in August 2024, a class action lawsuit was filed by a former CHL player, alleging that the NCAA ban on CHL players violated US anti-trust laws. The following month, Regina Pats forward Braxton Whitehead became the first CHL player to verbally commit to an NCAA team. In November 2024, amid increasing pressure, the NCAA voted to open eligibility to CHL players as of the 2025–26 season, marking a significant departure from longstanding policy. By the summer of 2025, over 300 CHL players had committed to the NCAA, while CHL teams themselves saw an influx of Junior A prospects.

== Champions and awards ==
=== Memorial Cup Champions ===
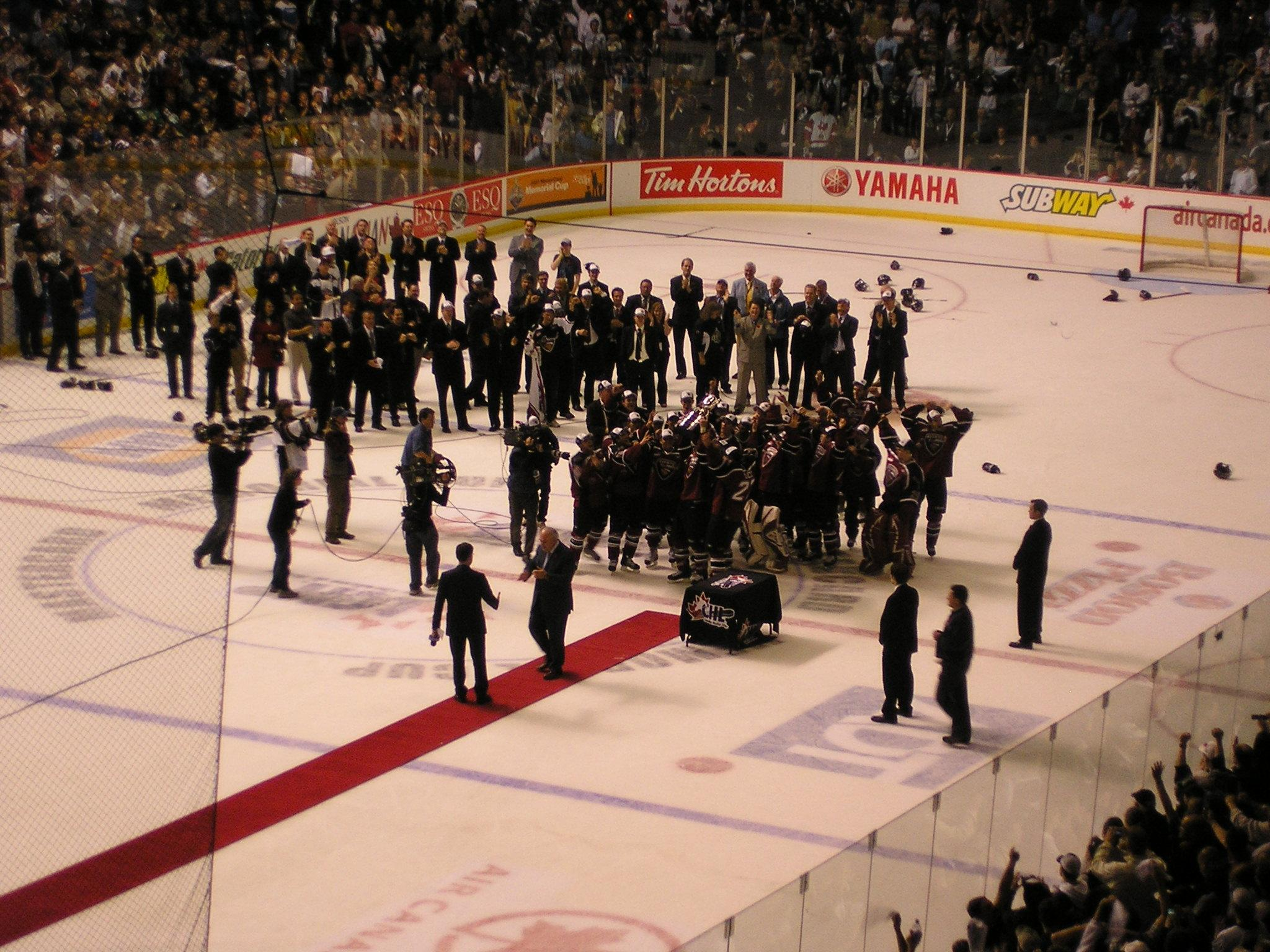
The Vancouver Giants celebrate their 2007 Memorial Cup victory.

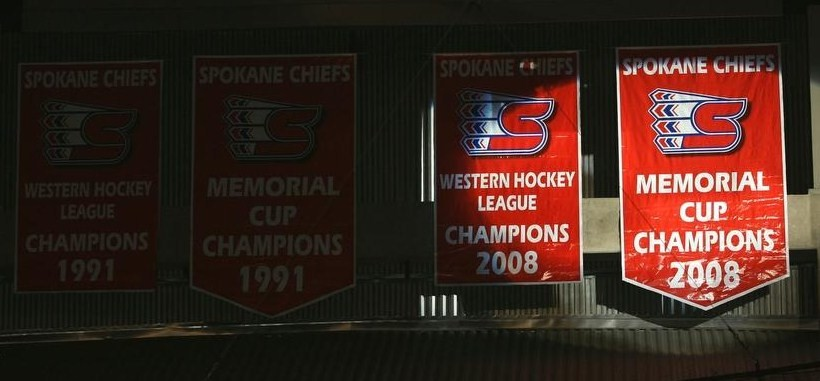
The Spokane Chiefs' 2008 Memorial Cup banner.

WHL teams earn the right to compete in the annual Memorial Cup tournament by winning the WHL playoff championship or, since 1983, by hosting the tournament. Altogether, the Memorial Cup has been won by WHL teams nineteen times since the league's founding.

- 2014: Edmonton Oil Kings
- 2008: Spokane Chiefs
- 2007: Vancouver Giants
- 2004: Kelowna Rockets
- 2002: Kootenay Ice
- 2001: Red Deer Rebels
- 1998: Portland Winter Hawks
- 1995: Kamloops Blazers
- 1994: Kamloops Blazers
- 1992: Kamloops Blazers
- 1991: Spokane Chiefs
- 1989: Swift Current Broncos
- 1988: Medicine Hat Tigers
- 1987: Medicine Hat Tigers
- 1985: Prince Albert Raiders
- 1983: Portland Winter Hawks
- 1978: New Westminster Bruins
- 1977: New Westminster Bruins
- 1974: Regina Pats

=== League records ===
Team records for a single season
Statistic	Total	Team	Season
Most points	125	Brandon Wheat Kings	1978–79
Most wins	60	Victoria Cougars	1980–81
Most wins, inaugural season	44	Penticton Vees	2025–26
Most goals for	496	Kamloops Blazers	1986–87
Fewest goals against	125	Kelowna Rockets	2003–04

Individual player records for a single season
Statistic	Player	Total	Season
Most goals	Ray Ferraro	108	1983–84
Most assists	Rob Brown	136	1986–87
Most points	Rob Brown	212	1986–87
Most points, rookie	Petr Nedved	145	1989–90
Most points, defenceman	Cam Plante	140	1983–84

=== League awards ===
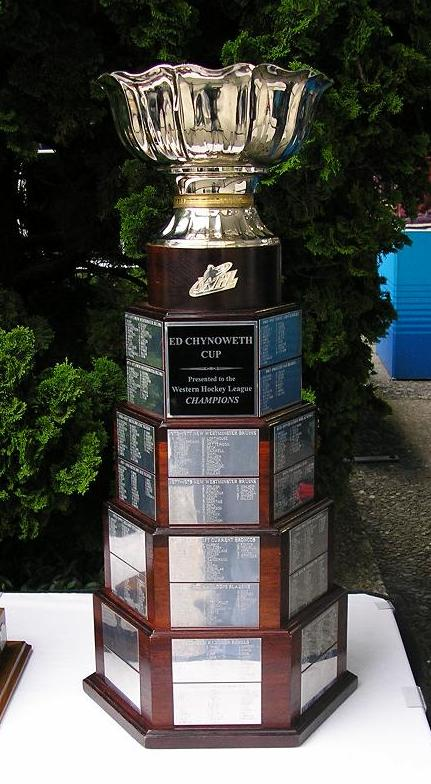
The Ed Chynoweth Cup is awarded to the WHL's playoff champion.

Award	Purpose	Most recent
Ed Chynoweth Cup	Playoff champion	Everett Silvertips
WHL Playoff MVP	Most valuable player in the playoffs	Harrison Meneghin (Medicine Hat Tigers)
Scotty Munro Memorial Trophy	Regular season champion	Everett Silvertips
Four Broncos Memorial Trophy	Player of the year	Jagger Firkus (Moose Jaw Warriors)
Doc Seaman Trophy	Scholastic player of the year	Noah Chadwick (Lethbridge Hurricanes)
Bob Clarke Trophy	Top scorer	Jagger Firkus (Moose Jaw Warriors)
Brad Hornung Trophy	Most sportsmanlike	Brayden Yager (Moose Jaw Warriors)
Bill Hunter Memorial Trophy	Top defenceman	Denton Mateychuk (Moose Jaw Warriors)
Del Wilson Trophy	Top goaltender	Brett Mirwald (Vancouver Giants)
Jim Piggott Memorial Trophy	Top rookie	Gavin McKenna (Medicine Hat Tigers)
WHL Plus-Minus Award	Best ± rating	Zac Funk (Prince George Cougars)
Dunc McCallum Memorial Trophy	Top coach	Mark Lamb (Prince George Cougars)
Lloyd Saunders Memorial Trophy	Top executive	Mark Lamb (Prince George Cougars)
Allen Paradice Memorial Trophy	Top official	Jeff Ingram
Doug Wickenheiser Memorial Trophy	Humanitarian of the year	Ty Hurley (Kelowna Rockets)
St. Clair Group Trophy	Best public relations	Edmonton Oil Kings

== Commissioners ==
- Frank Boucher (Commissioner), 1966–1968
- Ron Butlin (President), 1968–1971
- Jim Piggott (President) & Tom Fisher (Executive Secretary), 1971–1972
- Del Wilson (President) & Tom Fisher (Executive Secretary), 1972–1973
- Ed Chynoweth (President), 1973–1979
- David Descent (President), 1979–1980
- Ed Chynoweth (President), 1980–1995
- Dev Dley (Commissioner), 1995–2000
- Ron Robison (Commissioner), 2000–2024
- Dan Near (Commissioner), 2024–present

== See also ==
- List of ice hockey leagues
- CHL USA Prospects Challenge
