= CALS =

Cals or CALS may refer to:

== People with the surname ==
- Isabelle Cals, French opera singer
- Jo Cals (1914–1971), Dutch politician, Prime Minister of the Netherlands from 1965 to 1966
- Adolphe-Félix Cals (1810–1880), French portrait and landscape painter

== Organizations ==
- Central Arkansas Library System
- College of Agriculture and Life Sciences (disambiguation), a number of colleges at different universities

== Technology ==
- Client access license, a Microsoft license technology
- Continuous Acquisition and Life-cycle Support, a United States Department of Defense initiative for electronically capturing military documentation and linking related information
  - CALS Table Model, a standard for representing tables in SGML/XML
  - CALS Raster file format, a standard for the interchange of graphics data
