= Cal =

Cal or CAL may refer to:

== Arts and entertainment ==
- Cal (novel), a 1983 novel by Bernard MacLaverty
- "Cal" (short story), a science fiction short story by Isaac Asimov
- Cal (1984 film), an Irish drama starring John Lynch and Helen Mirren
  - Cal (album), the soundtrack album by Mark Knopfler
- Cal (2013 film), a British drama
- Judge Cal, a fictional character in the Judge Dredd comic strip in 2000 AD

== Aviation ==
- Cal Air International, an airline based in the United Kingdom
- Campbeltown Airport IATA airport code
- China Airlines ICAO airline code
- Continental Airlines, an American airline with the New York Stock Exchange symbol of "CAL"
- CAL Cargo Air Lines, a cargo airline based in Israel

== Organizations and businesses ==
- CAL Bank, a commercial bank in Ghana
- Cal Yachts, originally the Jensen Marine Corporation, founded in 1957
- Center for Applied Linguistics, a non-profit organization that researches language and culture
- Cercle artistique de Luxembourg, an artist association in Luxembourg
- Coalition of African Lesbians, a non-profit organisation based in South Africa
- Colorado Association of Libraries, professional association in Colorado
- Copyright Agency Ltd, an Australian copyright agency
- Columbia Alternative Library, an American publishing house

== People ==
- Cal (given name), a list of people
- Cal (surname), a list of people
- Cal (footballer) (born 1996), Brazilian footballer
- John Calipari (born 1959), American basketball coach often called "Coach Cal" or "Cal"

== Places ==
- a short form of the state of California
- Cal Islet, in the Madeira Islands Archipelago of Portugal
- Çal, a district and town in southwest Turkey

== School-related ==
- University of California, Berkeley, often shortened to "Cal"
  - California Golden Bears, UC Berkeley's intercollegiate athletic program

== Science and math ==
- Calanthe, an orchid genus abbreviated cal. in horticulture
- Calcium hydroxide, also called cal
- Caliber, firearm barrel measurement
- abbreviation for calorie, a unit of energy
- (archeological) abbreviation of 'calendar' (before 1950), or 'calibrated' (after 1950), for a year as identified by radiocarbon dating (i.e. calBCE 3000, cal. 3600 BC)
- Cold Atom Laboratory, an instrument to research Bose-Einstein Condensates on the International Space Station

== Software ==
- C/AL, a programming language used with Microsoft Dynamics NAV
- Cakewalk Application Language, a scripting language used with Cakewalk Pro Audio software
- CAL Actor Language, a dataflow language
- Cal (application), a former calendar app by Any.do
- cal (command), a program on various operating systems that prints an ASCII calendar of the given month or year
- CAL (programming language), a programming language based on JOSS
- Client access license, operating systems and software license scheme
- Cray Assembly Language, included with the Cray Operating System

== Sports ==
- Cape Ann League, a high school athletic conference in Massachusetts, United States
- Cape-Atlantic League, a high school athletic conference in New Jersey, United States
- Cyberathlete Amateur League, online electronic sports league

== Other uses ==
- Calipatria State Prison, California, United States
- Capital allocation line, a graph to measure risk
- Carolinian language ISO 639-3 code
- FN CAL, an assault rifle made by the Belgian firm FN (Fabrique Nationale)
- Cincinnati Academic League, a high school quiz bowl league
- Comprehensive Aramaic Lexicon, an online dictionary and text collection hosted by the Hebrew Union College

== See also ==
- CALS (disambiguation)
