= Association for Enterprise Information =

The Association for Enterprise Information (AFEI) is an association for the United States government and the defense industry.

AFEI was formed in 1998 as an affiliate organization to the National Defense Industrial Association. Before becoming an association, AFEI started as the US CALS (DOD) Industry Steering Group in 1985. This organization was formed at the request of OSD and designed to advise DoD on the selection of commercial standards for data exchange among dissimilar systems. The Steering Group also conducted programs and activity in e-commerce and e-business.

The AFEI mission is to lead government agencies, industry and academia to strengthen global enterprise integration technology, processes and solutions.

AFEI advances enterprise integration, network centric operations and world E-commerce, through a series of workshops, symposia, exhibits and working groups. These events and exhibitions are designed to facilitate information sharing and networking opportunities. AFEI is a conduit for DoD policy and strategy input from industry through jointly chartered working groups.

AFEI is a member organization of the Federation of Enterprise Architecture Professional Organizations (FEAPO), a worldwide association of professional organizations which have come together to provide a forum to standardize, professionalize, and otherwise advance the discipline of Enterprise Architecture.
