= Cal (given name) =

Cal is most commonly a masculine given name (more rarely it can be used as a feminine name, as in the case of Scottish Author Cal Flyn) or a shortened form of a given name (usually Calvin, Callum, Caleb), or rarely a variant of the Irish name Cathal. It may refer to:

== Cal ==
- Cal Crutchlow (born 1985), English motorcycle road racer
- Cal Flyn, Scottish author and journalist
- Cal McCombs (born 1945), American football coach
- Cal McCrystal (born 1959), Irish director and actor
- Cal McGowan (born 1970), American ice hockey player
- Cal Murphy (1932–2012), Canadian football coach and general manager
- Cal Quantrill (born 1995), Canadian baseball player
- Cal Stevenson (born 1996), American baseball outfielder
- Cal Chuchesta, alter-ego of music reviewer Anthony Fantano

== Short for Calvin ==
- Cal Abrams (1924–1997), American baseball player
- Cal Bailey (1909–1988), American caricaturist
- Cal Dooley (born 1954), American politician
- Cal Eldred (born 1967), American baseball player
- Cal Gardner (1924–2001), Canadian ice hockey player
- Cal Howard (1911–1993), American animator
- Cal Hubbard (1900–1977), American football player and baseball umpire
- Cal Jones (1933–1956), American football player
- Cal McLish (1925–2010), American baseball player and coach
- Cal McVey (1849–1926), American baseball player
- Cal Ripken Jr. (born 1960), American Hall of Fame baseball player
- Cal Ripken Sr. (1935–1999), American baseball coach and manager
- Cal Schenkel (born 1947), American artist
- Cal Smith (1932–2013), American country musician
- Cal Stoll (1923–2000), American football player and coach
- Cal Thomas (born 1942), American conservative pundit
- Cal Worthington (1920–2013), American car dealer

== Other ==
- Cal Adomitis (born 1998), American football player
- Cal Bouchard (born 1977), Canadian basketball player
- Cal McNair (born 1961), American football executive
- Cal Mitchell (born 1999), American baseball player
- Cal O'Reilly (born 1986), Canadian ice hockey player
- Cal Raleigh (born 1996), American baseball player
- Cal Tjader (1925–1982), American Latin jazz musician

== Fictional characters ==
- Cal Kestis, a Jedi Knight and main character in the 2019 video game Star Wars Jedi: Fallen Order
- Cal Stone, character in Manifest TV series

== See also ==
- Cal (disambiguation)
- Cal (surname)
- Chal (name)
