= Trevor Kidd =

Canadian ice hockey player (born 1972)

- Born: March 29, 1972 (age 54) Dugald, Manitoba, Canada
- Height: 6 ft 2 in (188 cm)
- Weight: 213 lb (97 kg; 15 st 3 lb)
- Position: Goaltender
- Caught: Left
- Played for: Calgary Flames; Carolina Hurricanes; Florida Panthers; Toronto Maple Leafs; Hannover Scorpions
- National team: Canada
- NHL draft: 11th overall, 1990; Calgary Flames
- Playing career: 1992–2006

Trevor Rodney Kidd (born March 29, 1972) is a Canadian former ice hockey goaltender who last played for the Hannover Scorpions in the Deutsche Eishockey Liga. Throughout his 12-year National Hockey League (NHL) career, Kidd played for the Calgary Flames, Carolina Hurricanes, Florida Panthers, and Toronto Maple Leafs. A first-round draft pick, Kidd was selected 11th overall by the Flames in the 1990 NHL entry draft.

== Playing career ==
Kidd spent the majority of his junior career with the Brandon Wheat Kings of the Western Hockey League (WHL). In 1989–90, He was named a WHL East First Team All-Star, the Del Wilson Trophy as WHL goaltender of the year, and won the CHL Goaltender of the Year award. He was traded to the Spokane Chiefs in 1991, and led them to the Memorial Cup championship. Kidd represented Canada three times at the World Junior Ice Hockey Championships, winning gold medals in 1990 and 1991. He also won a silver medal at the 1992 Winter Olympics as the national team's backup goaltender.

Kidd played his first NHL game in the 1991–92 NHL season with the Calgary Flames, a loss to the Pittsburgh Penguins on March 3, 1992. His second game, the only other game he would play that season, was a 4–3 victory over the San Jose Sharks on April 15, 1992.

Kidd stepped in full-time with the Flames in the 1993–94 NHL season, playing 31 games as backup to netminder Mike Vernon. He remained with the team through the 1996–97 NHL season. Kidd was traded prior to the start of the 1997–98 NHL season to the Carolina Hurricanes for center Andrew Cassels and goaltender Jean-Sébastien Giguère. Two years in Carolina followed where Kidd played with Sean Burke. The following year, goalie Arturs Irbe joined the team and the Hurricanes left Kidd unprotected for the upcoming expansion draft.

After being selected by the Atlanta Thrashers in the 1999 NHL expansion draft, Kidd was immediately traded to the Florida Panthers. Kidd started strong for the Panthers in the first 11 games of the 1999–2000 NHL season, but he was injured trying to make a save on a shot from teammate Peter Worrell during a league-mandated skills competition. This injury forced the Panthers to trade forward Radek Dvorak to the New York Rangers as part of a three-way deal with the San Jose Sharks for goaltender Mike Vernon, who left after the season for free agency. When Kidd returned from injury, he was not able to reestablish himself as the team's starting goaltender. The Panthers had acquired young goaltender Roberto Luongo and forward Olli Jokinen from the New York Islanders for forwards Mark Parrish and Oleg Kvasha, and Luongo edged out Kidd for the starter's role in the 2001–02 NHL season. He continued to fill the backup role for one more season before being released after clearing waivers before the 2002–03 NHL season.

Kidd signed with the Toronto Maple Leafs as a free agent on August 26, 2002. He had been closely connected to the Maple Leafs prior to the signing. Kidd followed up a 6–10–2 season in the 2002–03 NHL season with a 6–5–2 record (3.26 GAA, .876 save percentage) in 15 games in the 2003–04 NHL season. His final game was a 7–2 loss to the Philadelphia Flyers in which he replaced Ed Belfour.

During the NHL lockout, Kidd played with team HC Örebro 90 in Sweden. In May 2005, he signed a deal with the Hannover Scorpions in the DEL.

== Personal life ==
Kidd and his wife Tiffany have three daughters, who are avid soccer players. Taylor (born 1993) played soccer for the UTEP Miners from 2012 to 2015, Kennedy (born 1997) played with the North Dakota Fighting Hawks women's team, and Emerson (born 2001) also played for UTEP and trained with the Canadian National Team for the 2015 FIFA Women's World Cup.

Kidd is now an analyst for the Winnipeg Jets with TSN Winnipeg.

== Career statistics ==
=== Regular season and playoffs ===
			Regular season									Playoffs
Season	Team	League	GP	W	L	T	MIN	GA	SO	GAA	SV%	GP	W	L	MIN	GA	SO	GAA	SV%
1987–88	Eastman Selects	MMHL	14	—	—	—	840	66	0	4.71	—	—	—	—	—	—	—	—	—
1988–89	Brandon Wheat Kings	WHL	32	11	13	1	1509	102	0	4.06	—	—	—	—	—	—	—	—	—
1989–90	Brandon Wheat Kings	WHL	63	24	32	2	3676	254	2	4.15	—	—	—	—	—	—	—	—	—
1990–91	Brandon Wheat Kings	WHL	30	10	19	1	1730	117	0	4.06	—	—	—	—	—	—	—	—	—
1990–91	Spokane Chiefs	WHL	14	8	3	0	749	44	0	3.52	—	15	14	1	926	32	2	2.07	—
1990–91	Spokane Chiefs	M-Cup	—	—	—	—	—	—	—	—	—	3	3	0	180	5	0	1.67	—
1991–92	Canada	Intl.	28	18	4	4	1349	79	2	3.51	—	—	—	—	—	—	—	—	—
1991–92	Calgary Flames	NHL	2	1	1	0	120	8	0	4.00	.857	—	—	—	—	—	—	—	—
1992–93	Salt Lake Golden Eagles	IHL	29	10	16	1	1696	111	1	3.93	—	—	—	—	—	—	—	—	—
1993–94	Calgary Flames	NHL	31	13	7	6	1614	85	0	3.16	.887	—	—	—	—	—	—	—	—
1994–95	Calgary Flames	NHL	43	22	14	6	2463	107	3	2.61	.909	7	3	4	434	26	1	3.59	.856
1995–96	Calgary Flames	NHL	47	15	21	8	2570	119	3	2.78	.895	2	0	1	83	9	0	6.51	.775
1996–97	Calgary Flames	NHL	55	21	23	6	2979	141	4	2.84	.900	—	—	—	—	—	—	—	—
1997–98	Carolina Hurricanes	NHL	47	21	21	3	2685	97	3	2.17	.922	—	—	—	—	—	—	—	—
1998–99	Carolina Hurricanes	NHL	25	7	10	6	1358	61	2	2.70	.905	—	—	—	—	—	—	—	—
1999–2000	Florida Panthers	NHL	28	14	11	2	1574	69	1	2.63	.915	—	—	—	—	—	—	—	—
1999–2000	Louisville Panthers	AHL	1	0	1	0	60	5	0	5.00	.900	—	—	—	—	—	—	—	—
2000–01	Florida Panthers	NHL	42	10	23	6	2354	130	1	3.31	.893	—	—	—	—	—	—	—	—
2001–02	Florida Panthers	NHL	33	4	16	5	1683	90	1	3.21	.895	—	—	—	—	—	—	—	—
2002–03	Toronto Maple Leafs	NHL	19	6	10	2	1143	59	0	3.10	.896	—	—	—	—	—	—	—	—
2003–04	Toronto Maple Leafs	NHL	15	6	5	2	883	48	1	3.26	.876	1	0	0	33	1	0	1.82	.909
2003–04	St. John's Maple Leafs	AHL	1	1	0	0	60	1	0	1.00	.966	—	—	—	—	—	—	—	—
2004–05	HC Örebro 90	SWE-3	8	—	—	—	480	19	2	2.37	—	—	—	—	—	—	—	—	—
2005–06	Hannover Scorpions	DEL	45	—	—	—	2620	120	1	2.75	.907	10	4	6	596	32	0	3.22	.899
NHL totals			387	140	162	52	21,426	1014	19	2.84	.901	10	3	5	550	36	1	3.93	.845

=== International ===
Year	Team	Event	GP	W	L	T	MIN	GA	SO	GAA
1990	Canada	WJC	0	—	—	—	—	—	—	—
1991	Canada	WJC	6	—	—	—	340	15	—	2.65
1992	Canada	WJC	7	2	3	2	420	29	1	4.14
1992	Canada	OG	1	1	0	0	60	0	1	0.00
1992	Canada	WC	1	1	0	0	60	3	0	3.00
Junior totals			13	—	—	—	760	44	—	3.47
Senior totals			2	2	0	0	120	3	1	1.50

== Awards ==
- WHL East First All-Star Team – 1990

Awards and achievements
Preceded by Jason Muzzatti	Calgary Flames' first-round draft pick 1990	Succeeded by Niklas Sundblad
