= Bryan Maxwell =

Canadian ice hockey player and coach

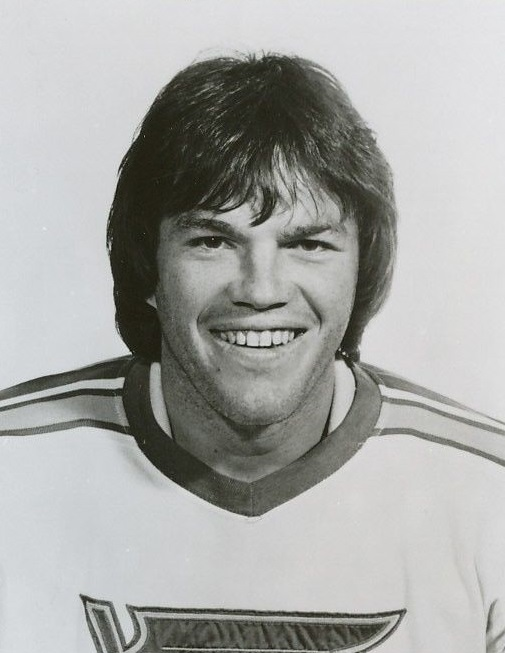
- Maxwell in 1980
- Born: September 7, 1955 (age 71) North Bay, Ontario, Canada
- Height: 6 ft 2 in (188 cm)
- Weight: 200 lb (91 kg; 14 st 4 lb)
- Position: Defence
- Shot: Left
- Played for: WHA; Cleveland Crusaders; Cincinnati Stingers; New England Whalers; NHL; Minnesota North Stars; St. Louis Blues; Winnipeg Jets; Pittsburgh Penguins
- NHL draft: 4th overall, 1975; Minnesota North Stars
- WHA draft: 2nd overall, 1975; Indianapolis Racers
- Playing career: 1976–1985

Bryan Clifford Maxwell (born September 7, 1955) is a Canadian former professional ice hockey player who played 331 games in the National Hockey League (NHL) and 124 games in the World Hockey Association. He played for the Cleveland Crusaders, Cincinnati Stingers, New England Whalers, Minnesota North Stars, St. Louis Blues, Winnipeg Jets, and Pittsburgh Penguins.

Maxwell was born in North Bay, Ontario. He is a former head coach of the ECHL hockey team, the Victoria Salmon Kings, out of Victoria, British Columbia.

== Career statistics ==
=== Regular season and playoffs ===
			Regular season					Playoffs
Season	Team	League	GP	G	A	Pts	PIM	GP	G	A	Pts	PIM
1972–73	Medicine Hat Tigers	WCHL	37	1	11	12	25	16	0	1	1	29
1973–74	Medicine Hat Tigers	WCHL	63	11	56	67	229	6	0	4	4	18
1974–75	Medicine Hat Tigers	WCHL	63	14	50	64	288	5	3	4	7	19
1975–76	Cleveland Crusaders	WHA	73	3	14	17	177	2	0	1	1	4
1976–77	Springfield Indians	AHL	13	2	3	5	67	—	—	—	—	—
1976–77	Cincinnati Stingers	WHA	34	1	8	9	29	4	0	0	0	29
1977–78	Minnesota North Stars	NHL	18	2	5	7	41	—	—	—	—	—
1977–78	Binghamton Dusters	AHL	24	2	8	10	69	—	—	—	—	—
1977–78	New England Whalers	WHA	17	2	1	3	11	—	—	—	—	—
1978–79	Minnesota North Stars	NHL	25	1	6	7	46	—	—	—	—	—
1978–79	Oklahoma City Stars	CHL	15	1	4	5	35	—	—	—	—	—
1979–80	St. Louis Blues	NHL	57	1	11	12	112	1	0	0	0	9
1979–80	Salt Lake Golden Eagles	CHL	3	0	1	1	10	—	—	—	—	—
1980–81	St. Louis Blues	NHL	40	3	10	13	137	11	0	1	1	54
1980–81	Salt Lake Golden Eagles	CHL	5	0	1	1	7	—	—	—	—	—
1981–82	Winnipeg Jets	NHL	45	1	9	10	110	—	—	—	—	—
1982–83	Winnipeg Jets	NHL	54	7	13	20	131	3	1	0	1	23
1983–84	Winnipeg Jets	NHL	3	0	3	3	27	—	—	—	—	—
1983–84	Pittsburgh Penguins	NHL	45	3	12	15	84	—	—	—	—	—
1984–85	Baltimore Skipjacks	AHL	4	0	0	0	2	14	3	2	5	40
1984–85	Pittsburgh Penguins	NHL	44	0	8	8	57	—	—	—	—	—
WHA totals			124	6	23	29	217	6	0	1	1	33
NHL totals			331	18	77	95	745	15	1	1	2	86

=== International ===
Year	Team	Event	GP	G	A	Pts	PIM
1975	Canada	WJC	5	0	0	0	10

== Coaching statistics ==
			Regular season							Postseason			
Year	Team	League	G	W	L	T	OTL	Pts	Finish	G	W	L	Result
1986–87	Medicine Hat Tigers	WHL	72	48	19	5	0	101	1st East Division	20	12	8	Won Memorial Cup
1989–90	Spokane Chiefs	WHL	72	30	37	5	0	65	4th West Division	6	1	5	Lost in Division Semifinals
1990–91	Spokane Chiefs	WHL	72	48	23	1	0	97	2nd West Division	15	14	1	Won Memorial Cup
1991–92	Spokane Chiefs	WHL	72	37	29	6	0	80	2nd West Division	9	5	4	Lost in Division Semifinals
1992–93	Spokane Chiefs	WHL	72	28	40	4	0	60	5th West Division	10	4	6	Lost in Division Semifinals
1993–94	Spokane Chiefs	WHL	72	31	37	4	0	66	5th West Division	3	0	3	Lost in First Round
1995–96^{†}	Lethbridge Hurricanes	WHL	48	25	20	3	0	53	2nd Central Division	4	0	4	Lost in First Round
1997–98	Lethbridge Hurricanes	WHL	72	32	29	11	0	75	2nd Central Division	4	0	4	Lost in First Round
1998–99	Lethbridge Hurricanes	WHL	72	31	32	9	0	71	3rd Central Division	4	0	4	Lost in First Round
1999–00	Lethbridge Hurricanes	WHL	72	25	38	4	5	59	4th Central Division	Did not qualify			
2000–01	Lethbridge Hurricanes	WHL	72	29	35	4	4	66	4th Central Division	5	1	4	Lost in Quarterfinals
2002–03^{†}	Lethbridge Hurricanes	WHL	34	13	17	2	2	30	5th Central Division	Did not qualify			
2004–05	Victoria Salmon Kings	ECHL	72	15	52	0	5	35	8th West Division	Did not qualify			
2005–06^{†}	Victoria Salmon Kings	ECHL	38	14	23	1	0	29	5th West Division	Did not qualify			

Legend

- ^{†} – Replaced midseason

== Transactions ==
- June, 1975 – Selected by the Cleveland Crusaders (WHA) in 1975 WHA Amateur Draft.
- June, 1976 – Transferred to the Minnesota Fighting Saints (WHA) after the Cleveland Crusaders (WHA) franchise relocated.
- September, 1976 – Traded to the Cincinnati Stingers (WHA) by the Minnesota Fighting Saints (WHA) for John McKenzie and the rights to Ivan Hlinka.
- May 26, 1977 – Traded to the New England Whalers (WHA) by the Cincinnati Stingers (WHA) with Greg Carroll for the rights to Mike Liut.
- February, 1978 – Signed as a free agent by the Minnesota North Stars after securing release from the New England Whalers (WHA).
- June 10, 1979 – Traded to the St. Louis Blues by the Minnesota North Stars with Richie Hansen for St. Louis' 2nd round choice (later traded to the Calgary Flames who selected Dave Reierson) in 1982 NHL entry draft.
- July 3, 1981 – Traded to the Winnipeg Jets by the St. Louis Blues with Paul MacLean and Ed Staniowski for Scott Campbell and John Markell.
- October 13, 1983 – Claimed on waivers by the Pittsburgh Penguins from the Winnipeg Jets.

== Personal life ==
Byran Maxwell has a family of elite hockey prospects and devotion to the Church of Jesus Christ of Latter-day Saints, as his father, Stan Maxwell, was an elite hockey prospect, his brother, Randy Maxwell, was an elite hockey prospect; and his son, Brooks Maxwell, was not only an elite hockey prospect, but also took two years off of his hockey career to serve a mission for the church. Also, his two nephews, Mitch Maxwell and Russ Maxwell were elite hockey prospects and took two years off their hockey careers to serve a mission for the church as well.

Preceded by Doug Hicks	Minnesota North Stars first-round draft pick 1975	Succeeded by Glen Sharpley
