= Jamie Linden =

Jamie Linden may refer to:

- Jamie Linden (ice hockey) (born 1972), former ice hockey right winger
- Jamie Linden (writer) (born 1980), American screenwriter
