= Steve Junker (ice hockey) =

Canadian ice hockey player (born 1972)

- Born: June 26, 1972 (age 53) Castlegar, British Columbia, Canada
- Height: 5 ft 9 in (175 cm)
- Weight: 176 lb (80 kg; 12 st 8 lb)
- Position: Right wing
- Shot: Left
- Played for: New York Islanders; Landshut Cannibals; Adler Mannheim; Schwenninger Wild Wings; Augsburger Panther
- National team: Canada
- NHL draft: 92nd overall, 1991; New York Islanders
- Playing career: 1992–2010

Steve Junker (born June 26, 1972) is a Canadian former professional ice hockey player. He was drafted by the New York Islanders with the 92nd pick in the 1991 NHL entry draft. He played in only five NHL regular-season games plus three playoff games between the 1992–93 and 1993–94 seasons, where he recorded his only NHL point. The rest of his career, which lasted from 1992 to 2010, was mainly spent in the Deutsche Eishockey Liga. On April 27, 2010, Junker was named head coach and general manager of the KIJHL's Castlegar Rebels; he held the roles for one year.

== Career statistics ==
=== Regular season and playoffs ===
			Regular season					Playoffs
Season	Team	League	GP	G	A	Pts	PIM	GP	G	A	Pts	PIM
1987–88	Castlegar Rebels	KIJHL	32	45	47	92	48	—	—	—	—	—
1988–89	Spokane Chiefs	WHL	68	19	15	34	40	—	—	—	—	—
1989–90	Spokane Chiefs	WHL	69	20	36	56	76	6	0	4	4	2
1990–91	Spokane Chiefs	WHL	71	39	38	77	86	15	5	13	18	6
1990–91	Spokane Chiefs	M-Cup	—	—	—	—	—	4	0	3	3	2
1991–92	Spokane Chiefs	WHL	68	34	39	73	128	10	6	7	13	18
1992–93	Capital District Islanders	AHL	79	16	31	47	20	4	0	0	0	0
1992–93	New York Islanders	NHL	—	—	—	—	—	3	0	1	1	0
1993–94	New York Islanders	NHL	5	0	0	0	0	—	—	—	—	—
1993–94	Salt Lake Golden Eagles	IHL	71	9	14	23	36	—	—	—	—	—
1994–95	Denver Grizzlies	IHL	72	13	16	29	37	11	3	4	7	4
1995–96	Detroit Vipers	IHL	22	4	5	9	14	—	—	—	—	—
1995–96	Los Angeles Ice Dogs	IHL	7	0	3	3	4	—	—	—	—	—
1995–96	Rochester Americans	AHL	29	5	2	7	31	—	—	—	—	—
1996–97	Canadian National Team	Intl	55	15	23	38	24	—	—	—	—	—
1997–98	EV Landshut	DEL	34	3	4	7	4	6	0	0	0	6
1998–99	EV Landshut	DEL	52	13	6	19	24	3	0	0	0	16
1999–00	Adler Mannheim	DEL	52	4	16	20	24	5	1	0	1	0
2000–01	Adler Mannheim	DEL	56	15	18	33	59	12	2	1	3	12
2001–02	Adler Mannheim	DEL	58	15	16	31	48	12	3	3	6	14
2002–03	Adler Mannheim	DEL	46	8	8	16	78	8	2	1	3	8
2003–04	Adler Mannheim	DEL	49	7	10	17	40	6	0	1	1	4
2004–05	SERC Wild Wings	GER-2	51	17	35	52	73	7	2	3	5	4
2005–06	SERC Wild Wings	GER-2	52	23	30	53	70	9	3	6	9	4
2006–07	SERC Wild Wings	GER-2	43	15	25	40	78	5	1	2	3	2
2007–08	SERC Wild Wings	GER-2	50	10	26	36	68	11	1	1	2	14
2008–09	Augsburger Panther	DEL	52	6	12	18	52	4	0	0	0	4
2009–10	Augsburger Panther	DEL	54	4	7	11	42	13	0	1	1	6
DEL totals			453	75	97	172	371	69	8	7	15	70
NHL totals			5	0	0	0	0	3	0	1	1	0

=== International ===
Year	Team	Event	GP	G	A	Pts	PIM
1992	Canada	WJC	7	2	2	4	4
Junior totals			7	2	2	4	4
