= Jamie Linden (ice hockey) =

Canadian ice hockey player

- Born: July 19, 1972 (age 52); Medicine Hat, Alberta, Canada
- Height: 6 ft 5 in (196 cm)
- Weight: 185 lb (84 kg; 13 st 3 lb)
- Position: Right wing
- Shot: Right
- Played for: Florida Panthers
- NHL draft: Undrafted
- Playing career: 1993–1998

Jamie Marion Linden (born July 19, 1972) is a Canadian former professional ice hockey right winger. He played four games for the Florida Panthers in the 1994–95 season, collecting 17 penalty minutes. The rest of his career, which lasted from 1993 to 1998, was spent in the minor leagues.

His brother is former NHL winger Trevor Linden. Linden and his brother own Linden Construction, a construction firm in Vancouver, British Columbia.

== Career statistics ==
=== Regular season and playoffs ===
| | | | Regular season | | | | | Playoffs |
| Season | Team | League | GP | G | A | Pts | PIM | GP | G | A | Pts | PIM |
|---|---|---|---|---|---|---|---|---|---|---|---|---|
| 1988–89 | Medicine Hat Tigers U18 | AMHL | 37 | 16 | 13 | 29 | 85 | — | — | — | — | — |
| 1988–89 | Portland Winter Hawks | WHL | 1 | 0 | 1 | 1 | 0 | — | — | — | — | — |
| 1989–90 | Portland Winter Hawks | WHL | 67 | 5 | 7 | 12 | 124 | — | — | — | — | — |
| 1990–91 | Portland Winter Hawks | WHL | 2 | 0 | 1 | 1 | 6 | — | — | — | — | — |
| 1990–91 | Prince Albert Raiders | WHL | 64 | 9 | 12 | 21 | 114 | 3 | 0 | 0 | 0 | 0 |
| 1991–92 | Prince Albert Raiders | WHL | 4 | 2 | 1 | 3 | 8 | — | — | — | — | — |
| 1991–92 | Spokane Chiefs | WHL | 60 | 7 | 10 | 17 | 302 | 10 | 0 | 0 | 0 | 69 |
| 1992–93 | Spokane Chiefs | WHL | 15 | 3 | 1 | 4 | 58 | — | — | — | — | — |
| 1992–93 | Medicine Hat Tigers | WHL | 50 | 9 | 9 | 18 | 147 | 10 | 1 | 6 | 7 | 15 |
| 1993–94 | Cincinnati Cyclones | IHL | 47 | 1 | 5 | 6 | 55 | 2 | 0 | 0 | 0 | 2 |
| 1993–94 | Birmingham Bulls | ECHL | 16 | 3 | 7 | 10 | 38 | — | — | — | — | — |
| 1994–95 | Florida Panthers | NHL | 4 | 0 | 0 | 0 | 17 | — | — | — | — | — |
| 1994–95 | Cincinnati Cyclones | IHL | 51 | 3 | 6 | 9 | 173 | — | — | — | — | — |
| 1995–96 | Carolina Monarchs | AHL | 50 | 4 | 8 | 12 | 92 | — | — | — | — | — |
| 1996–97 | Carolina Monarchs | AHL | 3 | 0 | 0 | 0 | 5 | — | — | — | — | — |
| 1996–97 | Grand Rapids Griffins | IHL | 48 | 8 | 8 | 16 | 138 | 5 | 1 | 1 | 2 | 4 |
| 1997–98 | Las Vegas Thunder | IHL | 28 | 1 | 1 | 2 | 62 | — | — | — | — | — |
| 1997–98 | Grand Rapids Griffins | IHL | 2 | 0 | 1 | 1 | 5 | 1 | 0 | 0 | 0 | 0 |
| IHL totals | | | 263 | 35 | 42 | 77 | 759 | 23 | 1 | 6 | 7 | 84 |
| NHL totals | | | 4 | 0 | 0 | 0 | 17 | — | — | — | — | — |
