= Scott Bailey (ice hockey) =

Canadian ice hockey player (born 1972)

- Born: May 2, 1972 (age 54) Calgary, Alberta, Canada
- Height: 6 ft 0 in (183 cm)
- Weight: 200 lb (91 kg; 14 st 4 lb)
- Position: Goaltender
- Caught: Left
- Played for: Boston Bruins
- NHL draft: 112th overall, 1992; Boston Bruins
- Playing career: 1992–2004

Scott A. Bailey (born May 2, 1972) is a Canadian former professional ice hockey goaltender who played 19 games in the National Hockey League for the Boston Bruins between 1995 and 1997. Bailey was drafted 112th overall by the Bruins in the 1992 NHL entry draft and spent most of his career in the American Hockey League with the Providence Bruins.

== Playing career ==
Bailey played major junior with the Moose Jaw Warriors and Spokane Chiefs of the Western Hockey League. He was selected 112th overall in the 1992 NHL entry draft by the Boston Bruins. Bailey played several years with the Bruins minor league affiliates in the American Hockey League and ECHL, and made his NHL debut on November 16, 1995 against the New Jersey Devils. He played 11 games for the Bruins during the 1995–96 season, and a further 8 games in the 1996–97 season. The rest of his career, which lasted until 2004, was spent in various minor leagues, including one season with Tappara in the Finnish SM-liiga.

== Post-playing career ==
Bailey has since ended his hockey career and has attended Taylor University College in Edmonton, Alberta, Canada earning a degree in Religion and Theology with a minor in Biblical Languages and is currently working for the Canada Research Chair in Dead Sea Scrolls Studies while working on his thesis for the MA in Biblical Studies at Trinity Western University.

== Career statistics ==
=== Regular season and playoffs ===
			Regular season									Playoffs
Season	Team	League	GP	W	L	T	MIN	GA	SO	GAA	SV%	GP	W	L	MIN	GA	SO	GAA	SV%
1988–89	Moose Jaw Warriors	WHL	2	0	1	0	34	7	0	12.35	.750	—	—	—	—	—	—	—	—
1989–90	Calgary Buffaloes	AJHL	17	—	—	—	991	55	1	3.33	—	—	—	—	—	—	—	—	—
1990–91	Spokane Chiefs	WHL	46	33	11	0	2537	157	4	3.71	.873	—	—	—	—	—	—	—	—
1990–91	Spokane Chiefs	M-Cup	—	—	—	—	—	—	—	—	—	1	1	0	60	4	0	4.00	—
1991–92	Spokane Chiefs	WHL	65	34	23	5	3798	206	1	3.30	.893	10	5	5	605	43	0	4.26	.877
1992–93	Johnstown Chiefs	ECHL	36	13	15	3	1750	112	1	3.84	.875	—	—	—	—	—	—	—	—
1993–94	Providence Bruins	AHL	7	2	2	2	377	24	0	3.82	.879	—	—	—	—	—	—	—	—
1993–94	Charlotte Checkers	ECHL	36	22	11	3	2180	130	1	3.58	.897	3	1	2	187	12	0	3.83	—
1994–95	Providence Bruins	AHL	52	25	16	9	2936	147	2	3.00	.900	9	4	4	504	31	2	3.69	.854
1995–96	Boston Bruins	NHL	11	5	1	2	571	31	0	3.26	.883	2	1	1	119	6	0	3.03	.927
1995–96	Providence Bruins	AHL	37	15	19	3	2210	120	1	3.26	.899	—	—	—	—	—	—	—	—
1996–97	Boston Bruins	NHL	8	1	5	0	394	24	0	3.66	.867	—	—	—	—	—	—	—	—
1996–97	Providence Bruins	AHL	31	11	17	2	1735	112	0	3.87	.881	7	3	4	453	23	0	3.05	.912
1997–98	San Antonio Dragons	IHL	37	11	17	3	1898	118	1	3.73	.891	—	—	—	—	—	—	—	—
1998–99	Orlando Solar Bears	IHL	17	5	7	0	749	36	0	2.88	.903	—	—	—	—	—	—	—	—
1998–99	Birmingham Bulls	ECHL	27	16	8	2	1557	90	1	3.47	.901	5	2	3	299	21	0	4.21	.886
1999–00	Tappara	FIN	6	0	4	2	347	29	0	5.01	.803	—	—	—	—	—	—	—	—
1999–00	Charlotte Checkers	ECHL	31	10	16	4	1735	93	2	3.22	.915	—	—	—	—	—	—	—	—
1999–00	Saint John Flames	AHL	4	0	1	0	135	11	0	4.90	.833	—	—	—	—	—	—	—	—
2000–01	Charlotte Checkers	ECHL	29	10	12	5	1682	89	1	3.17	.912	3	1	2	197	10	0	3.02	.902
2001–02	London Knights	BISL	1	—	—	—	60	5	0	5.00	.800	—	—	—	—	—	—	—	—
2001–02	Alaska Aces	WCHL	10	1	7	1	545	40	0	4.41	.863	—	—	—	—	—	—	—	—
2003–04	Lakeland Loggerheads	WHA2	1	0	1	0	22	4	0	10.70	.789	—	—	—	—	—	—	—	—
NHL totals			19	6	6	2	965	55	0	3.42	.876	—	—	—	—	—	—	—	—

== Awards ==
- WHL West Second All-Star Team – 1991 & 1992
