= Da Cal =

Da Cal is a surname. Notable people with the surname include:

- Ernesto Guerra Da Cal (1911–1994), Galician writer and philologist, father of Enric
- Enric Ucelay-Da Cal (born 1948), Spanish historian, son of Ernesto

== See also ==
- Cal (surname)
