= Spokane Chiefs =

Western Hockey League team in Spokane, Washington

- City: Spokane, Washington
- League: Western Hockey League
- Conference: Western
- Division: U.S.
- Founded: 1982
- Home arena: Numerica Veterans Arena
- Colors: Red, white and blue
- General manager: Matt Bardsley
- Head coach: Brad Lauer
- Website: chl.ca/whl-chiefs

Franchise history
- 1982–1985: Kelowna Wings
- 1985–present: Spokane Chiefs

Championships
- Playoff championships: Ed Chynoweth Cup; 2 (1991, 2008); Memorial Cup; 2 (1991, 2008) conference championships 2 (2008, 2025)

Current uniform

The Spokane Chiefs are an American major junior ice hockey team based in Spokane, Washington. The Chiefs play in the U.S. Division of the Western Hockey League's Western Conference and play home games at Numerica Veterans Arena. The Chiefs are two-time Memorial Cup champions—the second American team to win the title—winning in 1991 and 2008. Spokane hosted the first outdoor game in WHL history on January 15, 2011, at Avista Stadium.

== History ==
=== Origins ===
The original Spokane Chiefs were a senior team that played in the Western International Hockey League (WIHL) from 1982 to 1985, the last of several Spokane teams to play in the league dating back to the 1940s. In their final year, the Chiefs were the regular season and playoff WIHL champions. In 1982, Kelowna, British Columbia, was awarded an expansion team in the junior Western Hockey League; the Kelowna Wings played three seasons before the team relocated to Spokane in 1985 and took up the Chiefs name. The Chiefs became the second WHL team in Spokane after the short-lived Flyers, a team that stemmed from the WHL-charter member Flin Flon Bombers and operated from 1980 to 1982, when the team folded. The team began playing in the Spokane Coliseum, which had been hosting hockey since the 1950s.

=== First title and the 1990s ===
The Chiefs found relatively early success in Spokane, missing the playoffs only once in the team's first thirteen seasons. In their sixth season, led by Pat Falloon and Ray Whitney—both of whom would be drafted that summer by the National Hockey League's expansion San Jose Sharks—the team secured its WHL championship. The title helped to save the team, which was struggling financially; in 1990, the team was sold to new ownership, and hired two figures who had played roles in the Medicine Hat Tigers' 1987 Memorial Cup title in coach Bryan Maxwell and 32-year old general manager Tim Speltz. The 1990–91 season saw Whitney lead the league with 67 goals and 185 points, with Falloon trailing just behind with 64 goals and 138 points; meanwhile, the team saw what started the season as a half-full arena for home games start to sell-out. At the trade deadline, Speltz added goaltender Trevor Kidd, who proved essential to the team's success. In the playoffs, the Chiefs avenged a loss from the previous year against the defending champion Kamloops Blazers before dispatching the Lethbridge Hurricanes in the league final in four straight games. The team went on to secure the 1991 Memorial Cup, defeating the Drummondville Voltigeurs 5–1 in the championship game to become the second American team after the Portland Winter Hawks to win the title.

In 1995, the 1991 championship team was one of several Spokane hockey teams honoured as part of the closing of the Coliseum. Later that year, the Chiefs moved to the new Spokane Arena. In 2016, Whitney became the first player to have his number retired by the organization.

The team played in two more league finals, in 1996 and 2000, losing both. The team failed to qualify for the playoffs only once during the decade.

=== Second title and the 2000s ===
Although the Chiefs missed the playoffs in consecutive seasons for the first time in 2004–05 and 2005–06, the team achieved record success in 2007–08. Led by goaltender Dustin Tokarski, along with Jared Cowan and rookie Tyler Johnson, the Chiefs set a franchise record with 50 wins and 107 points. Like in 1991, they defeated the Lethbridge Hurricanes in the WHL championship in four game—with Johnson being named the playoff's most valuable player—to advance to the team's second Memorial Cup tournament. There, they defeated the Kitchener Rangers in the final by a score of 4–1; Tokarski's 53 saves in the final led to him being named the tournament's most valuable player. During the team's celebration with the trophy, its cup famously separated from its base, leaving the replica of the storied trophy in two pieces. Spokane native Johnson would go on to a successful career with the Chiefs, and in 2022 he became the second alumnus to have his jersey number retired by the club.

After their second Memorial Cup title, the Chiefs remained competitive for several seasons. In 2010, the Chiefs lost a playoff series to Portland four games to three; it was the first series in league history in which the home team did not win a game. The team entered a rebuilding phase in the late 2010s, a period disrupted by the COVID-19 pandemic.

=== Outdoor game and fan support ===
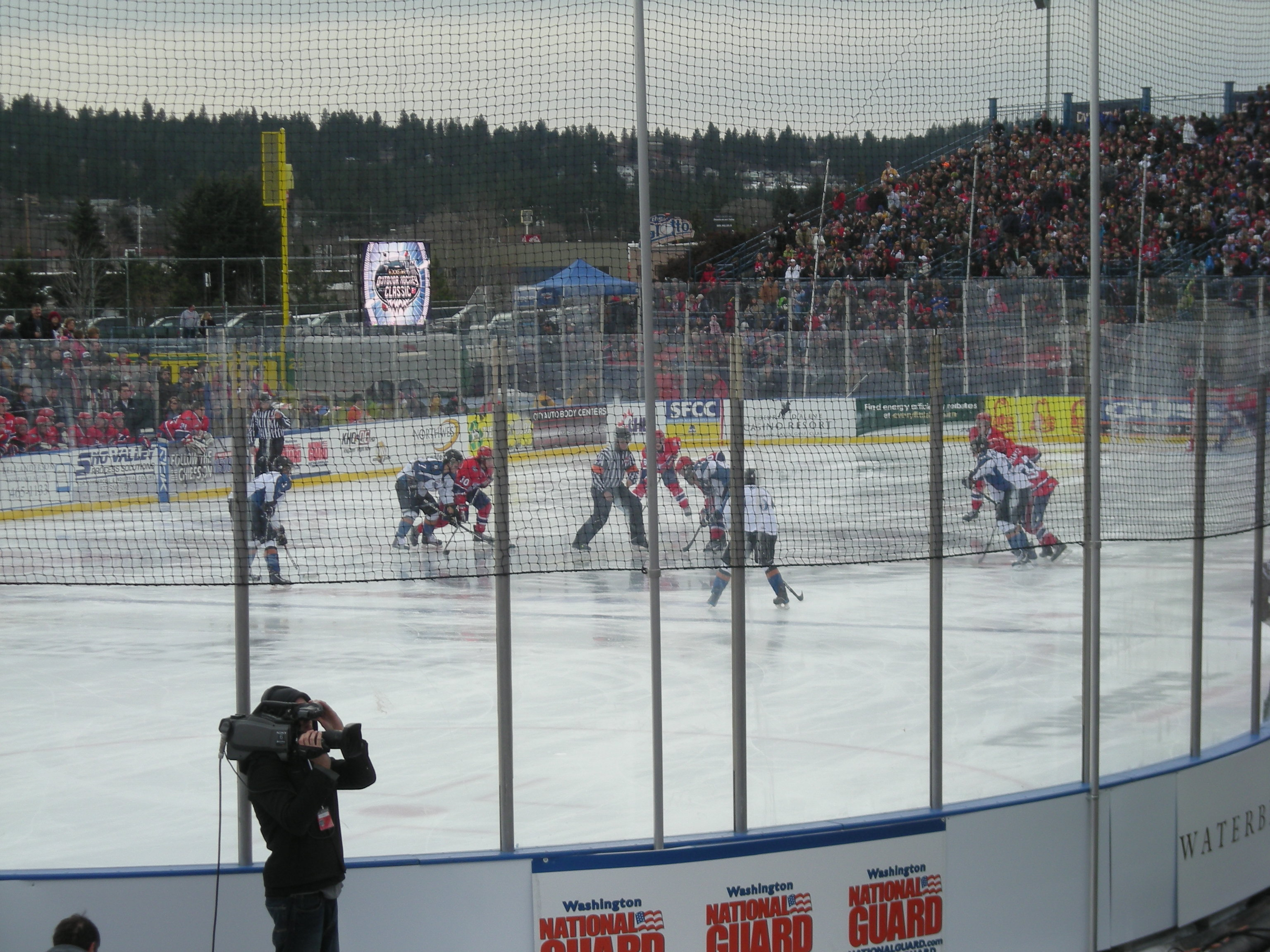
The Chiefs hosted the Kootenay Ice in the WHL's first outdoor game at Avista Stadium in Spokane. The Chiefs won the game 11–2.

Spokane hosted the Western Hockey League's first ever outdoor game on January 15, 2011 against the rival Kootenay Ice. The game, dubbed the "Outdoor Hockey Classic", was played at Avista Stadium in front of a sell-out crowd of 7,075. The Chiefs won the game by a score of 11–2.

Spokane has developed a reputation for strong support for the Chiefs, drawing large crowds recognized for their local traditions, like clapping in unison to celebrate goals. Attendance was especially strong coming off of the team's first championship in 1991, jumping thirty percent the following season, and helping the team commit to plans to build a new, larger arena. The team has since consistently ranked near the top of the WHL for attendance—for instance, in 2022–23, despite failing to qualify for the playoffs, the Chiefs were ranked second in the league for average attendance.

== Season-by-season record ==
=== Regular season ===
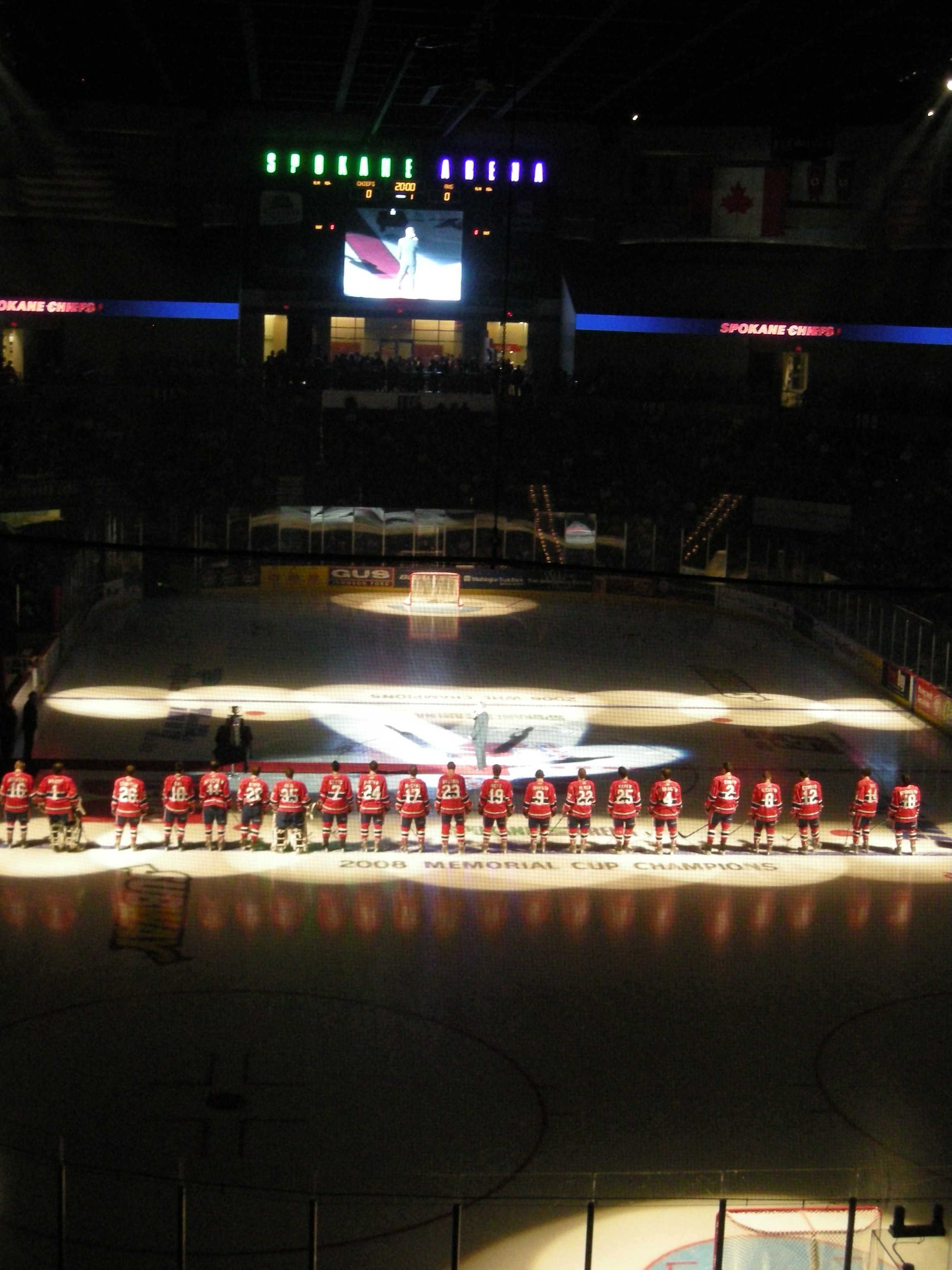
The Chiefs line up for a game with the Tri-City Americans.

Note: GP = Games played, W = Wins, L = Losses, T = Ties OTL = Overtime losses Pts = Points, GF = Goals for, GA = Goals against

Season	GP	W	L	T	OTL	GF	GA	Points	Finish	Playoffs
1985–86	72	30	41	1	-	373	413	61	3rd West	Lost West Division semifinal
1986–87	72	37	33	2	-	374	350	76	3rd West	Lost West Division semifinal
1987–88	72	37	32	3	-	330	296	77	2nd West	Lost West Division final
1988–89	72	25	45	2	-	326	419	56	6th West	Did not qualify
1989–90	72	30	37	5	-	334	344	65	4th West	Lost West Division semifinal
1990–91	72	48	23	1	-	435	275	97	2nd West	Won Championship and Memorial Cup
1991–92	72	37	29	6	-	267	270	80	2nd West	Lost West Division semifinal
1992–93	72	28	40	4	-	311	319	60	5th West	Lost West Division semifinal
1993–94	72	31	37	4	-	324	320	66	5th West	Lost West Division quarterfinal
1994–95	72	32	36	4	-	244	261	68	5th West	Lost West Division semifinal
1995–96	72	50	18	4	-	322	221	104	1st West	Lost WHL final
1996–97	72	35	33	4	-	260	235	74	3rd West	Lost West Division semifinal
1997–98	72	45	23	4	-	288	235	94	2nd West	Lost West Division final
1998–99	72	19	44	9	-	193	268	47	7th West	Did not qualify
1999–2000	72	47	19	4	2	272	191	100	1st West	Lost WHL final
2000–01	72	35	28	7	2	242	219	79	4th West	Lost West Division final
2001–02	72	33	25	11	3	223	206	80	2nd U.S.	Lost Western Conference semifinal
2002–03	72	26	36	6	4	216	261	62	2nd U.S.	Lost Western Conference semifinal
2003–04	72	32	29	4	7	200	215	75	4th U.S.	Lost Western Conference quarterfinal
2004–05	72	24	38	8	2	192	230	58	5th U.S.	Did not qualify
Season	GP	W	L	OTL	SOL	GF	GA	Points	Finish	Playoffs
2005–06	72	25	39	5	3	193	254	58	5th U.S.	Did not qualify
2006–07	72	36	28	4	4	232	217	80	4th U.S.	Lost Western Conference quarterfinal
2007–08	72	50	15	1	6	251	160	107	2nd U.S.	Won Championship and Memorial Cup
2008–09	72	46	23	0	3	246	145	95	2nd U.S.	Lost Western Conference semifinal
2009–10	72	45	22	3	2	240	179	95	3rd U.S.	Lost Western Conference quarterfinal
2010–11	72	48	18	4	2	310	193	102	2nd U.S.	Lost Western Conference final
2011–12	72	38	25	5	4	257	225	85	3rd U.S.	Lost Western Conference semifinal
2012–13	72	44	26	2	0	269	230	90	2nd U.S.	Lost Western Conference semifinal
2013–14	72	40	26	3	3	244	213	86	4th U.S.	Lost Western Conference quarterfinal
2014–15	72	34	34	3	1	219	229	72	4th U.S.	Lost Western Conference quarterfinal
2015–16	72	33	30	5	4	223	245	75	4th U.S.	Lost Western Conference quarterfinal
2016–17	72	27	33	8	4	235	272	66	5th U.S.	Did not qualify
2017–18	72	41	25	3	3	282	240	88	3rd U.S.	Lost Western Conference quarterfinal
2018–19	68	40	21	2	5	267	222	87	2nd U.S.	Lost Western Conference final
2019–20	64	41	18	4	1	258	179	87	3rd U.S.	Cancelled due to the COVID-19 pandemic
2020–21	21	6	10	4	1	55	79	17	4th U.S.	No playoffs held due to COVID-19 pandemic
2021–22	68	24	39	4	1	188	289	53	4th U.S.	Lost Western Conference quarterfinal
2022–23	68	15	43	4	6	195	314	40	5th U.S.	Did not qualify
2023–24	68	30	32	5	1	268	263	66	4th U.S.	Lost Western Conference quarterfinal
2024–25	68	45	20	1	2	292	202	93	2nd U.S.	Lost WHL final to Medicine Hat
2025–26	68	36	30	2	0	223	209	74	2nd U.S.	Lost Western Conference Quarterfinals

=== Playoff history ===
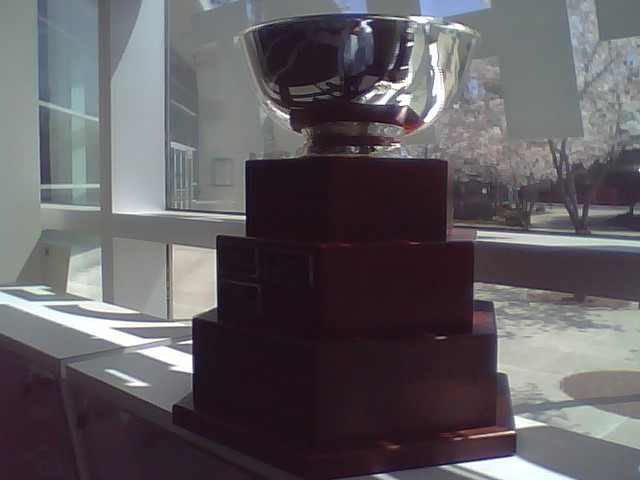
The Chiefs have won the Western Conference Championship five times, in 1991, 1996, 2000, 2008, and 2025.

- 1985–86: Lost to Portland Winter Hawks 5 games to 4 in conference semifinals.
- 1986–87: Lost to Portland Winter Hawks 5 games to 0 in conference semifinals.
- 1987–88: Defeated Victoria Cougars 5 games to 3 in conference semifinals.
  Lost to Kamloops Blazers 5 games to 2 in conference finals.
- 1988–89: Did not qualify.
- 1989–90: Lost to Kamloops Blazers 5 games to 1 in conference semifinals
- 1990–91: Defeated Seattle Thunderbirds 5 games to 1 in conference semifinals.
  Defeated Kamloops Blazers 5 games to 0 in conference finals.
  Defeated Lethbridge Hurricanes 4 games to 0 in WHL finals. WHL Champions
  Finished Memorial Cup round-robin in first place (3–0).
  Defeated Drummondville Voltigeurs 5–1 to win Memorial Cup. Memorial Cup Champions
- 1991–92: Defeated Portland Winter Hawks 4 games to 2 in conference quarterfinals.
  Lost to Seattle Thunderbirds 3 games to 1 in conference semifinals.
- 1992–93: Defeated Tacoma Rockets 4 games to 3 in conference quarterfinals.
  Lost to Kamloops Blazers 3 games to 0 in conference semifinals.
- 1993–94: Lost to Seattle Thunderbirds 3 games to 0 in conference quarterfinals.
- 1994–95: Advanced past round-robin tournament with 3–1 record.
  Lost to Tri-City Americans 4 games to 3 in conference semifinals.
- 1995–96: Defeated Portland Winter Hawks 4 games to 3 in conference quarterfinals.
  Earned second round bye.
  Defeated Kamloops Blazers 4 games to 2 in conference finals.
  Lost to Brandon Wheat Kings 4 games to 1 in WHL Finals.
- 1996–97: Defeated Kelowna Rockets 4 games to 2 in conference quarterfinals.
  Lost to Prince George Cougars 3 games to 0 in conference semifinals.
- 1997–98: Defeated Kelowna Rockets 4 games to 3 in conference quarterfinals.
  Defeated Prince George Cougars 3 games to 1 in conference semifinals.
  Lost to Portland Winter Hawks 4 games to 3 in conference finals.
  Hosted Memorial Cup, finished round-robin in third place (1–2).
  Lost 2–1 (OT) in semifinal to Guelph Storm.
- 1998–99: Did not qualify.
- 1999–2000: Defeated Tri-City Americans 4 games to 0 in conference quarterfinals.
  Earned second round bye.
  Defeated Prince George Cougars 4 games to 1 in conference finals.
  Lost to Kootenay Ice 4 games to 2 in WHL finals.
- 2000–01: Defeated Kamloops Blazers 4 games to 0 in conference quarterfinals.
  Defeated Seattle Thunderbirds 3 games to 0 in conference semifinals.
  Lost to Portland Winter Hawks 4 games to 1 in conference finals.
- 2001–02: Defeated Tri-City Americans 4 games to 1 in conference quarterfinals.
  Lost to Kelowna Rockets 4 games to 2 in conference semifinals.
- 2002–03: Defeated Portland Winter Hawks 4 games to 3 in conference quarterfinals.
  Lost to Kelowna Rockets 4 games to 0 in conference semifinals.
- 2003–04: Lost to Everett Silvertips 4 games to 0 in conference quarterfinals.
- 2004–05: Did not qualify.
- 2005–06: Did not qualify.
- 2006–07: Lost to Everett Silvertips 4 games to 2 in conference quarterfinals.
- 2007–08: Defeated Everett Silvertips 4 games to 0 in conference quarterfinals.
  Defeated Vancouver Giants 4 games to 2 in conference semifinals.
  Defeated Tri-City Americans 4 games to 3 in conference finals.
  Defeated Lethbridge Hurricanes 4 games to 0 in WHL finals. WHL Champions
  Finished Memorial Cup round-robin in first place (3–0).
  Defeated Kitchener Rangers 4–1 to win Memorial Cup. Memorial Cup Champions
- 2008–09: Defeated Seattle Thunderbirds 4 games to 1 in conference quarterfinals.
  Lost to Vancouver Giants 4 games to 3 in conference semifinals.
- 2009–10: Lost to Portland Winterhawks 4 games to 3 in conference quarterfinals.
- 2010–11: Defeated Chilliwack Bruins 4 games to 1 in conference quarterfinals.
  Defeated Tri-City Americans 4 games to 2 in conference semifinals.
  Lost to Portland Winterhawks 4 games to 2 in conference finals.
- 2011–12: Defeated Vancouver Giants 4 games to 2 in conference quarterfinals.
  Lost to Tri-City Americans 4 games to 3 in Conference semifinals.
- 2012–13: Defeated Tri-City Americans 4 games to 1 in conference quarterfinals.
  Lost to Portland Winterhawks 4 games to 0 in conference semifinals.
- 2013–14: Lost to Victoria Royals 4 games to 2 in conference quarterfinals.
- 2014–15: Lost to Everett Silvertips 4 games to 2 in conference quarterfinals.
- 2015–16: Lost to Victoria Royals 4 games to 2 in conference quarterfinals.
- 2016–17: Did not qualify.
- 2017–18: Lost to Portland Winterhawks 4 games to 3 in conference quarterfinals.
- 2018–19: Defeated Portland Winterhawks 4 games to 1 in conference quarterfinals.
  Defeated Everett Silvertips 4 games to 1 in conference semifinals.
  Lost to Vancouver Giants 4 games to 1 in conference finals.
- 2019–20: No playoffs were held
- 2020–21: No playoffs were held
- 2021–22: Lost to Kamloops Blazers 4 games to 0 in conference quarterfinals.
- 2022–23: Did not qualify.
- 2023–24: Lost to Prince George Cougars 4 games to 0 in conference quarterfinals.
- 2024–25: Defeated Vancouver Giants 4 games to 1 in conference quarterfinals.
  Defeated Victoria Royals 4 games to 2 in conference semifinals.
  Defeated Portland Winterhawks 4 games to 0 in conference finals.
  Lost to Medicine Hat Tigers 4 games to 1 in WHL finals.
- 2025–26: Lost to Prince George Cougars 4 games to 2 in conference quarterfinals.

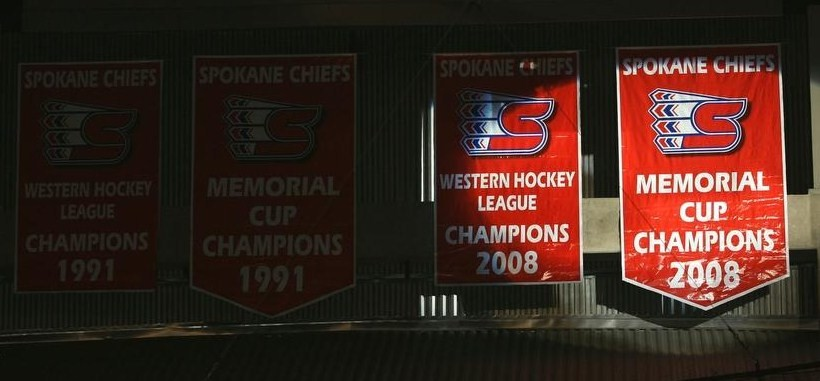
On September 27, 2008, the Chiefs unveiled their WHL and Memorial Cup Championship banners.

== Championship history ==
- Memorial Cup: 1991, 2008
- Ed Chynoweth Cup: 1990–91, 2007–08
- Conference Championship: 2007–08, 2024–25
- Regular season Division titles: 1995–96, 1999–00

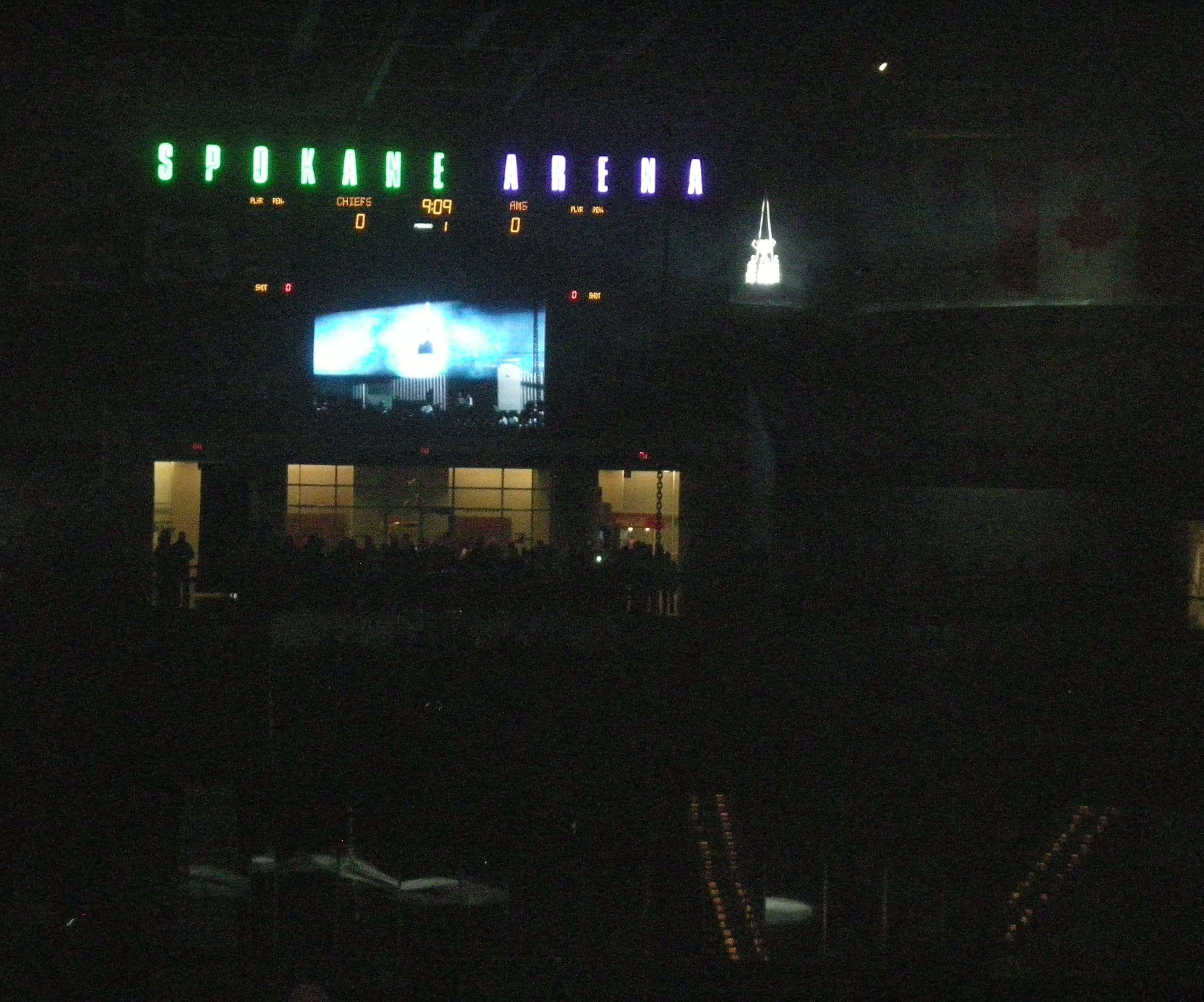
The Memorial Cup is lowered via rope from the roof of Spokane Arena on opening night, 2008. Four months earlier, the Cup broke in the Chiefs' hands during their on-ice celebration.

=== WHL Championship series ===
- 1990–91: Win, 4–0, vs. Lethbridge Hurricanes
- 1995–96: Loss, 1–4, vs. Brandon Wheat Kings
- 1999–2000: Loss, 2–4, vs. Kootenay Ice
- 2007–08: Win, 4–0, vs. Lethbridge Hurricanes
- 2024–25: Loss, 1–4, vs. Medicine Hat Tigers

=== Memorial Cup finals ===
- 1991: Win, 5–1 vs Drummondville Voltigeurs
- 2008: Win, 4–1 vs Kitchener Rangers

== Players ==
=== NHL alumni ===
- Jaret Anderson-Dolan
- Scott Bailey
- Adam Beckman
- Mike Berger
- Matt Berlin
- Rick Berry
- Maxim Bets
- Drayson Bowman
- Barry Brust
- Valeri Bure
- Berkly Catton
- Marian Cisar
- Jared Cowen
- Rocky Dundas
- Justin Falk
- Pat Falloon
- Brad Ference
- Jack Finley
- Wade Flaherty
- Link Gaetz
- Troy Gamble
- Brent Gilchrist
- Michael Grabner
- Travis Green
- Ian Herbers
- Justin Hocking
- Tony Horacek
- Jan Hrdina
- Tyler Johnson
- Ty Jones
- Steve Junker
- Matt Keith
- Trevor Kidd
- Jon Klemm
- Zenith Komarniski
- Filip Kral
- Darcy Kuemper
- Jason Labarbera
- Greg Leeb
- Jamie Linden
- Darcy Loewen
- Lynn Loyns
- Doug Lynch
- Bryan McCabe
- Jamie McLennan
- Brantt Myhres
- Rich Parent
- Jason Podollan
- Craig Reichert
- Jeff Rohlicek
- Kyle Rossiter
- Derek Ryan
- Kurt Sauer
- Kevin Sawyer
- Paxton Schulte
- Cam Severson
- Jeff Sharples
- Ty Smith
- Jared Spurgeon
- Dustin Tokarski
- Roman Tvrdon
- Dominik Uher
- Mick Vukota
- Darcy Wakaluk
- Trent Whitfield
- Ray Whitney
- Kailer Yamamoto

=== Retired numbers ===
Players who have had their numbers retired by the Chiefs:

#	Player	Ref.
9	Tyler Johnson	
14	Ray Whitney	

== Executives ==
=== Head coaches ===
All-time regular season records in parentheses.

- 1985 Ernie Gare Jr. (1–5–0)
- 1985–1986 Marc Pezzin (30–41–1)
- 1986–1987 Peter Esdale (37–33–2)
- 1987–1989 Butch Goring (39–41–3)
- 1989 (Interim) Bob Strumm (2–4–0)
- 1989 Gary Braun (21–32–2)
- 1989–1994 Bryan Maxwell (165–155–22)
- 1994 (Interim) Tim Speltz (1–0)
- 1994 (Interim) Perry Shockey (0–1)
- 1994 (Interim) Mike Fedorko (9–11–2)
- 1994–2000 Mike Babcock (234–169–29–2)
- 1997 (Interim) Brian Cox (5–2–0)
- 2000–2002 Perry Ganchar (68–53–18–5)
- 2003–2005 Al Conroy (82–103–18–13)
- 2005–2008 Bill Peters (111–81–10–12)
- 2008 (Interim) Leigh Mendelson (1–0)
- 2008–2010 Hardy Sauter (91–45–3–5)
- 2010–2017 Don Nachbaur (261–190–30–19)
- 2017–2019 Dan Lambert (81–46–5–8)
- 2019–2020 Manny Viveiros (41–18–5)
- 2020–2022 Adam Maglio (18–36–9)
- 2022–2024 Ryan Smith (42–46–7)
- 2024–present Brad Lauer (0–0–0)

=== General managers ===
- 1985–1986 Marc Pezzin
- 1986–1989 Bob Strumm
- 1989–1990 Brian Maxwell
- 1990–2016 Tim Speltz
- 2016–2022 Scott Carter
- 2022–present Matt Bardsley

== Radio and television coverage ==
Spokane Chiefs games are broadcast on AM 1510 KGA throughout Eastern Washington, Northern Idaho and parts of British Columbia.

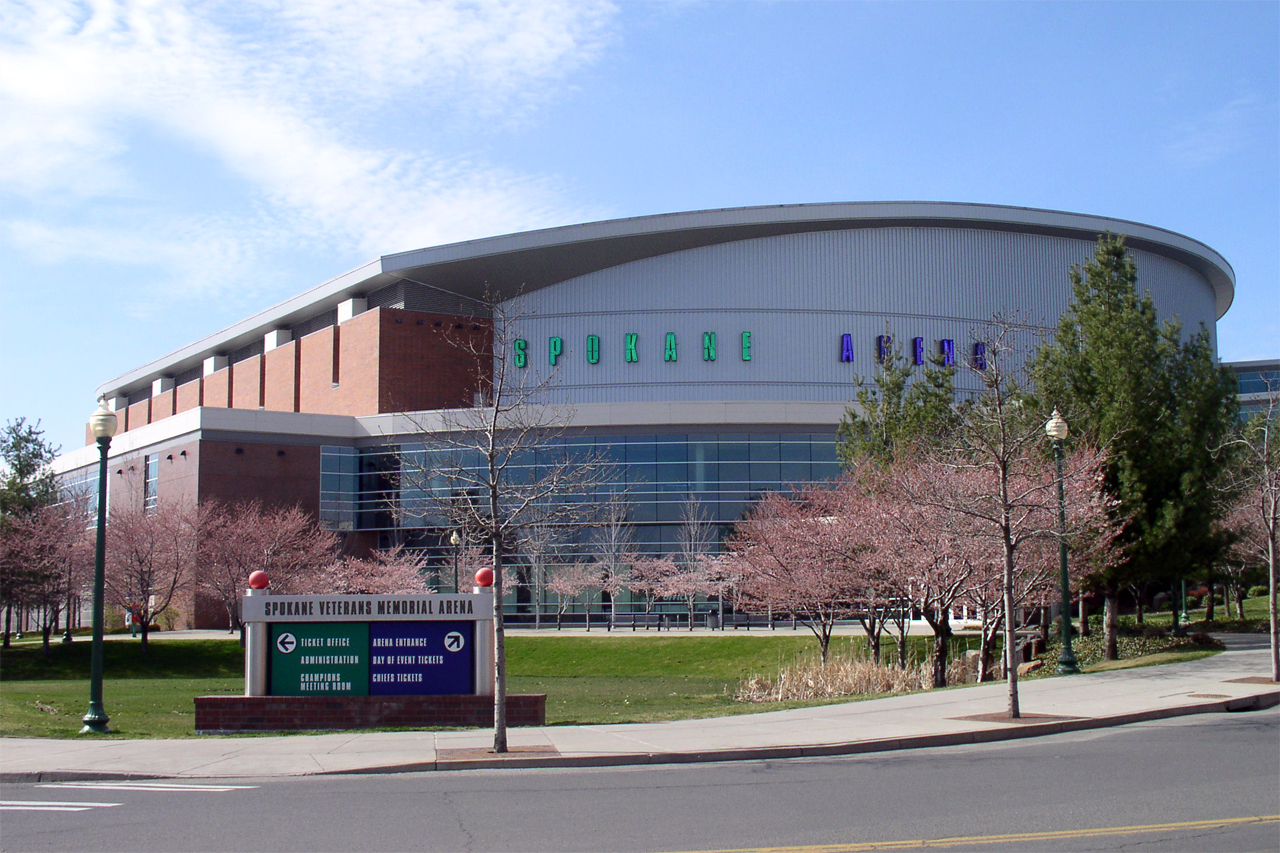
The Chiefs play home games at Spokane Arena.

== Arenas ==
- 1950–1995: Spokane Coliseum (capacity: 5,400)
- 1995–present: Spokane Veterans Memorial Arena (capacity: 9,916)

=== Chiefs attendance ===
Table includes average attendance and WHL attendance rank.

Season	Total attendance	Average	Games	WHL rank
1996–97	281,743	7,826	36	2nd
1997–98	289,735	8,048	36	2nd
1998–99	259,150	7,482	36	2nd
1999–2000	255,974	7,200	36	1st
2000–01	231,960	6,669	36	2nd
2001–02	229,308	6,370	36	3rd
2002–03	219,586	6,100	36	3rd
2003–04	226,550	6,293	36	3rd
2004–05	225,002	6,250	36	4th
2005–06	219,802	6,092	36	5th
2006–07	220,019	6,028	36	4th
2007–08	236,056	6,557	36	3rd
2008–09	239,620	6,656	36	3rd
2009–10	243,370	6,453	36	3rd
2010–11	231,811	6,439	36	3rd
2011–12	231,946	6,443	36	2nd
2012–13	229,232	6,368	36	3rd
2013–14	219,662	6,102	36	4th
2014–15	209,836	5,829	36	5th
2015–16		5,765	36	4th
2016–17	209,225	5,812	36	5th
2017–18		5,741	36	3rd
2018–19		5,959	36	2nd
2019–20		5,709	31	3rd
2020–21	Season Cancelled	—	21	4th
2021–22		4,419	34	4th
2022–23		5,842	34	5th
2023–24	205,500	6,044	34	3rd
