= Ray Whitney (ice hockey) =

Canadian ice hockey player (born 1972)

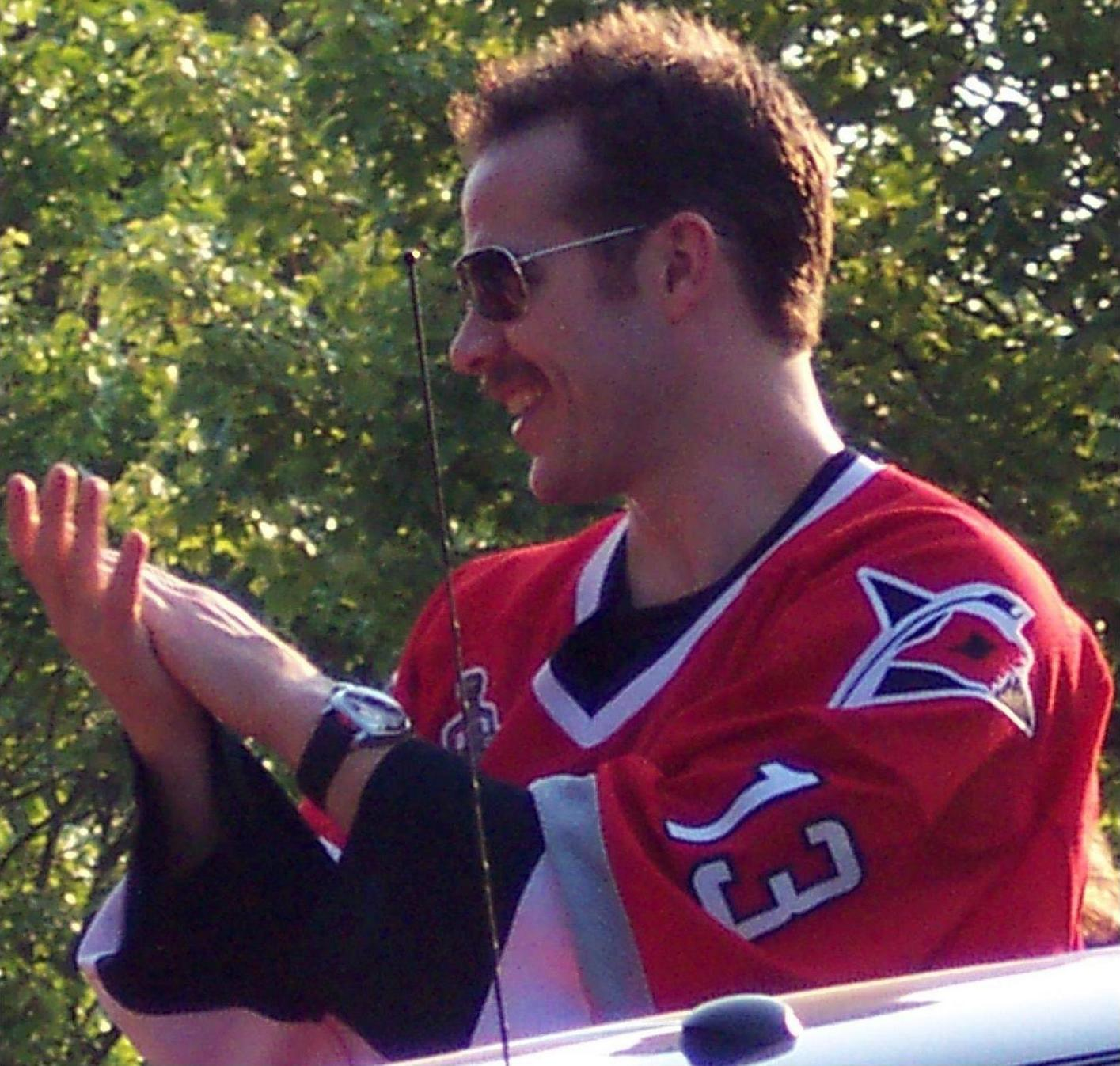
- Whitney with the Carolina Hurricanes in 2006
- Born: May 8, 1972 (age 54) Fort Saskatchewan, Alberta, Canada
- Height: 5 ft 10 in (178 cm)
- Weight: 180 lb (82 kg; 12 st 12 lb)
- Position: Left wing
- Shot: Right
- Played for: San Jose Sharks; Edmonton Oilers; Florida Panthers; Columbus Blue Jackets; Detroit Red Wings; Carolina Hurricanes; Phoenix Coyotes; Dallas Stars
- National team: Canada
- NHL draft: 23rd overall, 1991; San Jose Sharks
- Playing career: 1991–2014

Raymond D. Whitney (born May 8, 1972) is a Canadian former professional ice hockey player who was a left winger for 22 seasons in the National Hockey League (NHL) for the San Jose Sharks, Edmonton Oilers, Florida Panthers, Columbus Blue Jackets, Detroit Red Wings, Carolina Hurricanes, Phoenix Coyotes, and Dallas Stars.

Whitney excelled for the Spokane Chiefs, with the 1990–91 season seeing him lead the Western Hockey League (WHL) in points with 185 while leading the team to their first ever Memorial Cup championship. He was the second player to be drafted by the expansion team San Jose Sharks in the 1991 NHL draft, where he played for six years before spending the next four seasons for four different teams while being named to the All-Star Game in the 1999–2000 season.

With a short frame of 5-foot-10 and 180-pounds, Whitney managed to cultivate a career of 1,330 games while acquiring the nickname "The Wizard" for his passing and playmaking skills that had him labeled as one of the most underrated players in league history.

Whitney played the most games of his career with the Carolina Hurricanes, where he signed as a free agent prior to the 2005–06 season. In the Stanley Cup playoff run, he recorded 15 points in 24 games as the Hurricanes won the Stanley Cup for his only championship. After five seasons in Carolina, he played the final four seasons with Phoenix and Dallas. In 2012, he became the 79th player to record 1,000 points. He retired in 2014, having recorded 1,064 points in his career. In 2016, Whitney had his number 14 jersey retired by the Chiefs, the first player to receive the honor in team history.

== Playing career ==
Before Whitney played in the NHL, he and his brother Dean were stick boys for the NHL's Wayne Gretzky era Edmonton Oilers. The third stick boy with the Whitney brothers was another future NHL player, Ryan Smyth. During his junior career, Whitney spent three years with the Spokane Chiefs of the Western Hockey League (WHL), leading the entire league with 185 points during the 1990-91 season. Whitney and the Chiefs won the 1991 Memorial Cup as champions of the Canadian Hockey League.

Whitney was the second player ever drafted by the San Jose Sharks, picked in the second round (23rd overall) in the 1991 NHL entry draft. Pat Falloon, his teammate with the WHL's Spokane Chiefs, was the Sharks' first pick. Whitney started his professional career in the 1991-92 season, playing with teams in the German Deutsche Eishockey Liga and the International Hockey League, as well as two games with the San Jose Sharks. Whitney has played for several different NHL teams during his 24-year career, including the San Jose Sharks (1991–92 to 1996–97), Edmonton Oilers (1997–98), Florida Panthers (1997–98 to 2000–01), Columbus Blue Jackets (2000–01 to 2002–03), Detroit Red Wings (2003–04), Carolina Hurricanes, Phoenix Coyotes, and Dallas Stars.

On August 6, 2005, Whitney signed a two-year contract with the Carolina Hurricanes paying him $1.5 million per year. In his first season with the Hurricanes in 2005–06, Whitney helped Carolina win their first Stanley Cup with fellow Fort Saskatchewan native Mike Commodore. On February 8, 2007, Whitney scored a natural hat trick in 1 minute and 40 seconds. On April 13, 2007, Whitney re-signed with the Hurricanes, agreeing to a three-year contract that pays him $3.5 million per year.

On July 1, 2010, Whitney signed a 2-year deal with the Phoenix Coyotes for $3 million per year. Whitney was the last remaining member of the San Jose Sharks inaugural team (1991–92) active in the NHL until his retirement on January 21, 2015. He was also the last remaining active player to get his start in the NHL as a member of the expansion San Jose Sharks.

On March 31, 2012, Whitney became the 79th player in the history of the NHL to score 1,000 regular-season points when he registered an assist in a game against the Anaheim Ducks. Whitney recorded the milestone at the age of 39 years and 328 days, making him the oldest player to reach the plateau, a mark he still holds. On July 1, 2012, Whitney signed a 2-year, $9 million contract with the Dallas Stars. On January 21, 2015, he announced his retirement as an NHL player, ending his career after producing 1,064 points (385-679) in 1,330 regular-season games.

The last active member of his 1991 NHL draft class, Whitney ranked 1st in points, assists, and games played among players for that year.

== Coaching ==
On June 30, 2026, Whitney was named assistant coach of the Los Angeles Kings. This move reunited him with Peter Laviolette, who coached Whitney in Carolina and was recently named head coach of the Kings.

== Personal life ==
Ray and wife Brijet married in 2000 and have three children; two daughters and a son.

== International play ==
Whitney was a member of Team Canada at four different Ice Hockey World Championships. He made his debut at the 1998 World Championship, recording six points in seven games while Canada finished out of the medals. Whitney notched seven points in 10 games at the 1999 World Championship, again missing a medal when Canada lost in the semifinals to the Czech Republic. He joined Team Canada at the 2002 World Championship, with Canada again failing to medal. At the 2010 World Championship, Whitney replaced Ryan Smyth as Canada's captain when Smyth broke his foot early in the tournament. Canada did not win a medal in that year's world championship.

== Career statistics ==
=== Regular season and playoffs ===
			Regular season					Playoffs
Season	Team	League	GP	G	A	Pts	PIM	GP	G	A	Pts	PIM
1987–88	Fort Saskatchewan Pop Shop Selects	AMBHL	71	80	155	235	119	—	—	—	—	—
1988–89	Spokane Chiefs	WHL	71	17	33	50	16	—	—	—	—	—
1989–90	Spokane Chiefs	WHL	71	57	56	113	50	6	3	4	7	6
1990–91	Spokane Chiefs	WHL	72	67	118	185	36	15	13	18	31	12
1991–92	Kölner Haie	1.GBun	10	3	6	9	4	—	—	—	—	—
1991–92	San Diego Gulls	IHL	63	36	54	90	12	4	0	0	0	0
1991–92	San Jose Sharks	NHL	2	0	3	3	0	—	—	—	—	—
1992–93	Kansas City Blades	IHL	46	20	33	53	14	12	5	7	12	2
1992–93	San Jose Sharks	NHL	26	4	6	10	4	—	—	—	—	—
1993–94	San Jose Sharks	NHL	61	14	26	40	14	14	0	4	4	8
1994–95	San Jose Sharks	NHL	39	13	12	25	14	11	4	4	8	2
1995–96	San Jose Sharks	NHL	60	17	24	41	16	—	—	—	—	—
1996–97	San Jose Sharks	NHL	12	0	2	2	4	—	—	—	—	—
1997–98	Edmonton Oilers	NHL	9	1	3	4	0	—	—	—	—	—
1997–98	Florida Panthers	NHL	68	32	29	61	28	—	—	—	—	—
1998–99	Florida Panthers	NHL	81	26	38	64	18	—	—	—	—	—
1999–00	Florida Panthers	NHL	81	29	42	71	35	4	1	0	1	4
2000–01	Florida Panthers	NHL	43	10	21	31	28	—	—	—	—	—
2000–01	Columbus Blue Jackets	NHL	3	0	3	3	2	—	—	—	—	—
2001–02	Columbus Blue Jackets	NHL	67	21	40	61	12	—	—	—	—	—
2002–03	Columbus Blue Jackets	NHL	81	24	52	76	22	—	—	—	—	—
2003–04	Detroit Red Wings	NHL	67	14	29	43	22	12	1	3	4	4
2005–06	Carolina Hurricanes	NHL	63	17	38	55	42	24	9	6	15	14
2006–07	Carolina Hurricanes	NHL	81	32	51	83	46	—	—	—	—	—
2007–08	Carolina Hurricanes	NHL	66	25	36	61	30	—	—	—	—	—
2008–09	Carolina Hurricanes	NHL	82	24	53	77	32	18	3	8	11	4
2009–10	Carolina Hurricanes	NHL	80	21	37	58	26	—	—	—	—	—
2010–11	Phoenix Coyotes	NHL	75	17	40	57	24	4	1	2	3	2
2011–12	Phoenix Coyotes	NHL	82	24	53	77	28	16	2	5	7	10
2012–13	Dallas Stars	NHL	32	11	18	29	4	—	—	—	—	—
2013–14	Dallas Stars	NHL	69	9	23	32	14	5	0	0	0	0
NHL totals			1,330	385	679	1,064	465	108	21	32	53	48

=== International ===
Year	Team	Event	Result	GP	G	A	Pts	PIM
1998	Canada	WC	6th	6	4	2	6	4
1999	Canada	WC	4th	10	1	6	7	22
2002	Canada	WC	6th	7	1	3	4	2
2010	Canada	WC	7th	7	2	6	8	0
Senior totals				30	8	17	25	28

== Awards and honours ==
Award	Year
WHL
West first All-Star team	1991
Bob Clarke Trophy	1991
Four Broncos Memorial Trophy	1991
WHL Champion	1991
Memorial Cup All-Star team	1991
Memorial Cup Most Sportsmanlike Player	1991
Memorial Cup Champion	1991
NHL
All-Star Games	2000, 2003
Stanley Cup champion	2006
Second All-Star team	2012

== See also ==
- List of NHL players with 1,000 points
- List of NHL players with 1,000 games played

Sporting positions
Preceded by Lyle Odelein	Columbus Blue Jackets captain 2002–03	Succeeded by Luke Richardson
