= 1991 Memorial Cup =

Canadian junior men's ice hockey championship

Tournament details
- Venue(s): Colisée de Québec; Quebec City, Quebec
- Dates: May 11–19, 1991
- Teams: 4
- Host team: Beauport Harfangs (QMJHL; did not participate)
- TV partner: TSN

Final positions
- Champions: Spokane Chiefs (WHL) (1st title)

Tournament statistics
- Games played: 8

The Memorial Cup trophy

The 1991 Memorial Cup occurred May 11–19 at the Colisée de Québec in Quebec City, Quebec. It was the 73rd annual Memorial Cup competition and determined the major junior ice hockey champion of the Canadian Hockey League (CHL). Participating teams were the Quebec Major Junior Hockey League champion Chicoutimi Saguenéens and runner-up Drummondville Voltigeurs, as well as the winners of the Ontario Hockey League and Western Hockey League which were the Sault Ste. Marie Greyhounds and Spokane Chiefs. The original host team, the Beauport Harfangs, dropped out after finishing 26-40-4 in the 1990–91 QMJHL season and failing to qualify for the playoffs. Spokane, led by the high-scoring duo of Pat Falloon and Ray Whitney, dominated the tournament and won their first Memorial Cup, defeating Drummondville 5–1 in the final game. The Chiefs became the second American team to win the Memorial Cup.

== Teams ==
QMJHL Team OHL Team WHL Team Host City

=== Chicoutimi Saguenéens ===
The Chicoutimi Saguenéens had the best record in the QMJHL during the 1990–91, winning the Jean Rougeau Trophy. The Saguenéens record was 43-21-6, earning 92 points and first place in the Dilio Division. Chicoutimi had the fourth highest goal total in the league, scoring 299 goals. The team allowed the fewest goals in the QMJHL at 223, winning the Robert Lebel Trophy. In the QMJHL quarter-finals, the Saguenéens defeated the Shawinigan Cataractes four games to two. Chicoutimi then faced off against the Laval Titan, who had won the QMJHL championship in the previous two seasons. The Saguenéens managed to defeat Laval four games to three, advancing to the President's Cup, and earning a berth in the 1991 Memorial Cup as the host team, the Beauport Harfangs dropped out of the tournament. Chicoutimi swept the Drummondville Voltigeurs in four games to win their first QMJHL championship.

Defenseman Francois Belanger led the club in points, as he scored 29 goals and 80 points in 63 games. Stephane Charbonneau led the Saguenéens in goals with 37, finishing with a total of 67 points in 55 games after being acquired in an early season trade with the Shawinigan Cataractes. Steve Larouche scored 35 goals and 76 points in only 48 games with the club due to injuries. In the post-season, Larouche scored a team high 13 goals and 33 points in 17 games. Goaltender Felix Potvin had a breakout season. Potvin finished the season with a 33-14-4 record with a 2.70 GAA and a .908 save percentage. Potvin was awarded the Shell Cup - Defensive as the top defensive player in the league. His 2.70 GAA led the league, awarded Potvin the Jacques Plante Memorial Trophy. In the playoffs, Potvin had a record of 11-4 with a 2.78 GAA and a .901 save percentage, winning the Guy Lafleur Trophy for most valuable player in the post-season.

The 1991 Memorial Cup was the first appearance by the Saguenéens.

=== Drummondville Voltigeurs ===
The Drummondville Voltigeurs finished the 1990–91 season in third place in the Dilio Division with a record of 42-25-3, earning 87 points. Drummondville had the second most potent offense in the league, scoring 331 goals. The team finished with the fourth highest goals against in the QMJHL, allowing 282 goals. In the post-season, the Voltigeurs upset the Trois-Rivières Draveurs in the QMJHL quarter-finals with a four game to two series victory. In the QMJHL semi-finals, Drummondville defeated the Longueuil Collège Français, the top team from the Lebel Division, in a four game sweep. This ensured the Voltigeurs a berth at the 1991 Memorial Cup, as the host team, the Beauport Harfangs dropped out of the tournament after they failed to qualify for the playoffs. In the President's Cup finals against the Chicoutimi Saguenéens, the Voltigeurs were swept in four games.

Drummondville was led offensively by Denis Chasse, who finished fifth in league scoring with 47 goals and 101 points in 62 games. His 47 goals were the third most in the league. Eric Plante scored 41 goals and 80 points in 69 games. Roger Larche had 28 goals and 71 points in 53 games, while adding a team high 24 points in 17 playoff games. Seventeen year old Yanick Dupre scored 29 goals and 67 points in 58 games, while another seventeen year old, Rene Corbet, scored 25 goals and 65 points in 45 games, helping both players get selected at the 1991 NHL entry draft. Corbet won the Michel Bergeron Trophy, awarded to the Offensive Rookie of the Year. Defenseman Patrice Brisebois, acquired by the Voltigeurs prior to the season from the Laval Titan, scored 17 goals and 61 points in 54 games with Drummondville. Brisebois won the Emile Bouchard Trophy as the Top Defenseman in the QMJHL. Brisebois also won the Paul Dumont Trophy, awarded to the Personality of the Year. Goaltender Pierre Gagnon was acquired from the Victoriaville Tigres early in the season became the starting goaltender for the Voltigeurs, posting a record of 25-11-3 with a 3.46 GAA and a .874 save percentage in 41 games.

The 1991 Memorial Cup was the second time that the Voltigeurs qualified for the tournament. In the 1988 Memorial Cup, Drummondville finished in fourth place.

=== Sault Ste. Marie Greyhounds ===
The Sault Ste. Marie Greyhounds represented the Ontario Hockey League at the 1991 Memorial Cup. The Greyhounds finished the 1990–91 season with a 42-21-3 record, earning 87 points and first place in the Emms Division. Sault Ste. Marie scored 303 goals, the seventh highest total in the OHL, while allowing a league best 217 goals. In the Emms Division quarter-finals, the Greyhounds defeated the Dukes of Hamilton in a four game sweep, earning a bye in the division semi-finals. In the Emms Division finals, Sault Ste. Marie swept the Niagara Falls Thunder in four games and a berth in the J. Ross Robertson Cup finals. In the championship round, the Greyhounds defeated the favoured Oshawa Generals four games to two to win the Cup and earn a berth in the 1991 Memorial Cup.

Colin Miller led the Greyhounds in scoring, as he had 26 goals and 86 points in 62 games. Miller added a team high 22 points in 14 post-season games. Jarrett Reid led the team with 37 goals, as he had 66 points in 63 games. Seventeen year old rookie Ralph Intranuovo scored 25 goals and 67 points in 63 games, while Denny Lambert scored 28 goals and 67 points in 59 games. Tony Iob was acquired by the team midway through the season in a trade with the Kingston Frontenacs, and in 24 games, Iob scored 18 goals and 29 points. Iob continued his hot play in the post-season, scoring 14 goals and 21 points in 14 games. Adam Foote led the defense, as he scored 18 goals and 69 points in 59 games. Brad Tiley scored 11 goals and 66 points in 66 games, while Bob Boughner scored 13 goals and 46 points in 64 games. Goaltending duties were split between Mike Lenarduzzi and Kevin Hodson. Hodson won the F.W. "Dinty" Moore Trophy, awarded to the first-year goaltender with the best goals against average in the league. Hodson had a record of 18-11-0 with a 3.22 GAA and a .884 save percentage in 30 games. Lenarduzzi had a record of 19-8-3 with a 3.27 GAA and a .879 save percentage. Both Hodson and Lenarduzzi were awarded the Dave Pinkney Trophy, which is awarded to the team with the lowest GAA.

The 1991 Memorial Cup was the second time the Greyhounds earned a berth in the tournament. In the 1985 Memorial Cup, Sault Ste. Marie finished in third place.

=== Spokane Chiefs ===
The Spokane Chiefs represented the Western Hockey League at the 1991 Memorial Cup. The Chiefs had a record of 48-23-1, earning 97 points and a second place finish in the West Division. Spokane was a very high scoring team, leading the WHL with 435 goals scored. The Chiefs were the second best team defensively, allowing 275 goals. In the West Division semi-finals, the Chiefs defeated the Seattle Thunderbirds five games to one, setting up a series with the best team in the regular season, the Kamloops Blazers, in the West Division finals. The Chiefs shocked the Blazers, sweeping the series fives games to zero, earning a berth in the President's Cup finals. In the final round, the Chiefs swept the Lethbridge Hurricanes four games to none to earn a berth in the 1991 Memorial Cup.

The Chiefs were led by Ray Whitney, who had the second highest goal total in the league with 67 goals, and had a league high 185 points, in 72 games, earning the Bob Clarke Trophy. Whitney was also awarded the Four Broncos Memorial Trophy, given to the Most Valuable Player in the league. Whitney led the Chiefs in playoff scoring with 13 goals and 31 points in 15 games. Pat Falloon scored 64 goals and 138 points in 61 games. Falloon won the Brad Hornung Trophy, awarded to the Most Sportsmanlike Player in the WHL. Falloon was ranked as the top prospect in the 1991 NHL entry draft, and both Falloon and Whitney would be selected by the San Jose Sharks. Mark Woolf scored 41 goals and 90 points in 67 games, while Steve Junker had 39 goals and 77 points in 71 games. Jon Klemm anchored the blue line, scoring seven goals and 65 points in 72 games. Scott Bailey was the Chiefs starting goaltender for a majority of the season, however, the club acquired Trevor Kidd in a late season trade with the Brandon Wheat Kings. Kidd was a top goaltending prospect who was the first goalie selected in the 1990 NHL entry draft.

The 1991 Memorial Cup was the first time the Chiefs had qualified for the tournament.

== Round-robin standings ==
Pos	Team	Pld	W	L	GF	GA	
1	Spokane Chiefs (WHL)	3	3	0	22	8	Advanced directly to the championship game
2	Drummondville Voltigeurs (QMJHL runner-up)	3	2	1	12	12	Advanced to the semifinal game
3	Chicoutimi Saguenéens (QMJHL)	3	1	2	6	13	Advanced to the semifinal game
4	Sault Ste. Marie Greyhounds (OHL)	3	0	3	7	14	

== Scores ==
Round-robin

- May 11 – Drummondville 4–2 Sault Ste. Marie
- May 12 – Spokane 7–3 Drummondville
- May 12 – Chicoutimi 2–1 Sault Ste. Marie
- May 14 – Spokane 7–1 Chicoutimi
- May 15 – Spokane 8–4 Sault Ste. Marie
- May 16 – Drummondville 5–3 Chicoutimi

Semi-final

- May 18 – Drummondville 2–1 Chicoutimi (OT)

Final

- May 19 – Spokane 5–1 Drummondville

=== Winning roster ===
1990-91 Spokane Chiefs
Goaltenders: – Scott Bailey; – Trevor Kidd	Defencemen: – Bart Cote; – Tommie Eriksen; – Frank Evans; – Danny Faassen; – Geoff Grandberg; – Jon Klemm - C; – Chris Lafreniere; – Shane Maitland; – Kerry Toporowski; – Trevor Tovell	Wingers: – Mike Chrun; – Cam Danyluk; – Pat Falloon; – Steve Junker; – Mark Szoke; – Calvin Thudium; – Brent Thurston; – Bram Vanderkracht; – Mark Woolf	Centres: – Murray Garbutt; – Mike Jickling; – Ray Whitney - C; Coach: Bryan Maxwell; General Manager: Tim Speltz

== Award winners ==
- Stafford Smythe Memorial Trophy (MVP): Pat Falloon, Spokane
- George Parsons Trophy (Sportsmanship): Ray Whitney, Spokane
- Hap Emms Memorial Trophy (Goaltender): Felix Potvin, Chicoutimi

All-star team

- Goal: Felix Potvin, Chicoutimi
- Defence: Patrice Brisebois, Drummondville; Brad Tiley, Sault Ste. Marie
- Centre: Pat Falloon, Spokane
- Left wing: Ray Whitney, Spokane
- Right wing: Brent Thurston, Spokane
