= Pat Falloon =

Canadian ice hockey player (born 1972)

- Born: September 22, 1972 (age 53) Foxwarren, Manitoba, Canada
- Height: 5 ft 11 in (180 cm)
- Weight: 200 lb (91 kg; 14 st 4 lb)
- Position: Right wing
- Shot: Right
- Played for: San Jose Sharks; Philadelphia Flyers; Ottawa Senators; Edmonton Oilers; Pittsburgh Penguins; HC Davos
- National team: Canada
- NHL draft: 2nd overall, 1991; San Jose Sharks
- Playing career: 1991–2001

Pat Falloon (born September 22, 1972) is a Canadian former professional ice hockey player who was a right winger for nine seasons in the National Hockey League between 1991 and 2000. He played with the San Jose Sharks, Philadelphia Flyers, Ottawa Senators, Edmonton Oilers, and Pittsburgh Penguins. He would also play a season in the Swiss National League. The first player drafted by the Sharks, Falloon had a standout junior career with the Spokane Chiefs of the Western Hockey League, with consecutive 60 goal seasons before being drafted.

== Playing career ==
Falloon was named Memorial Cup Tournament MVP in 1991 with the Spokane Chiefs of the WHL.

Falloon was drafted 2nd overall by the San Jose Sharks in the 1991 NHL entry draft. He was the first-ever draft pick in the history of the San Jose Sharks organization. Ray Whitney, his teammate with the WHL's Spokane Chiefs, was the Sharks' second pick. The Sharks had thought the pair would be a natural scoring combination, but that didn't pan out. On January 10, 1993, Falloon was injured in a game against the Ottawa Senators after a hipcheck in front of the net led to Falloon falling onto his shoulder. This injury and its surgery resulted in Falloon losing full range of motion in his right shoulder, a hindrance that some consider to be a key moment in his statistical downfall.

After playing in San Jose for four years, Falloon was traded November 16, 1995 to the Philadelphia Flyers in exchange for LW Martin Spanhel, a first-round draft choice in the 1996 Entry Draft and a third-round draft choice (these picks were later transferred to the Phoenix Coyotes and Buffalo Sabres and used to acquire Danny Briere and Mike Martone, respectively).

He was traded January 17, 1998 to the Ottawa Senators along with Václav Prospal and a second-round draft choice, in exchange for Alexandre Daigle, the first overall draft pick in 1993. He later played for both the Edmonton Oilers and Pittsburgh Penguins.

After his 1999-2000 season with the Penguins, Falloon was no longer an active NHL player, instead going on to play for HC Davos in Switzerland for the 2000–2001 season. After his season in Switzerland, Falloon returned to his hometown of Foxwarren to play for the Foxwarren Falcons, a Senior A team within the Manitoba and Saskatchewan based North Central Hockey League.

During his time in the NCHL, Falloon had a comparatively high statistical performance to the rest of the league, and won two single-season scoring titles. With the Falcons, he helped them win six straight league championships from 2001–02 to 2006–07 (the Falcons also won without Falloon in 2000–01). This string of championships was broken in 2007–08 by the Roblin Northstars.

== Post-hockey ==
In 2008, Falloon played his final season for the NCHL. Falloon now continues to be a grain farmer on his family farm. He has one daughter, Camryn Falloon, who played hockey for St. Marys Academy in the CSSHL as a forward, and is now set to play for the Midland University Warriors beginning in the 2025-2026 season.

== Legacy ==
Falloon was considered a talented prospect in his own right, and the Sharks expected him to be one of the building blocks of their young franchise in the coming decade. However, in a draft class so heavily focused on 1st overall pick Eric Lindros, Falloon is now considered by some to be a 'consolation prize' in comparison. Falloon delivered decent returns as a rookie, notching 59 points in 1991–92, but never topped that production for the remainder of his career, and is widely regarded as a draft bust. Future Hockey Hall-of-Famers Scott Niedermayer and Peter Forsberg were selected with the third and sixth picks respectively after Falloon went second in the 1991 draft. Later in his career Falloon became known more for his lack of conditioning.

He played 575 career NHL games, scoring 143 goals and 179 assists for 322 points.

== Career statistics ==
=== Regular season and playoffs ===
			Regular season					Playoffs
Season	Team	League	GP	G	A	Pts	PIM	GP	G	A	Pts	PIM
1987–88	Yellowhead Chiefs	MMHL	52	74	69	143	50	—	—	—	—	—
1988–89	Spokane Chiefs	WHL	72	22	56	78	41	—	—	—	—	—
1989–90	Spokane Chiefs	WHL	71	60	64	124	48	6	5	8	13	4
1990–91	Spokane Chiefs	WHL	61	64	74	138	33	15	10	14	24	10
1990–91	Spokane Chiefs	MC	—	—	—	—	—	4	8	4	12	2
1991–92	San Jose Sharks	NHL	79	25	34	59	16	—	—	—	—	—
1992–93	San Jose Sharks	NHL	41	14	14	28	12	—	—	—	—	—
1993–94	San Jose Sharks	NHL	83	22	31	53	18	14	1	2	3	6
1994–95	San Jose Sharks	NHL	46	12	7	19	25	11	3	1	4	0
1995–96	San Jose Sharks	NHL	9	3	0	3	4	—	—	—	—	—
1995–96	Philadelphia Flyers	NHL	62	22	26	48	6	12	3	2	5	2
1996–97	Philadelphia Flyers	NHL	52	11	12	23	10	14	3	1	4	2
1997–98	Philadelphia Flyers	NHL	30	5	7	12	8	—	—	—	—	—
1997–98	Ottawa Senators	NHL	28	3	3	6	8	1	0	0	0	0
1998–99	Edmonton Oilers	NHL	82	17	23	40	20	4	0	1	1	4
1999–2000	Edmonton Oilers	NHL	33	5	13	18	4	—	—	—	—	—
1999–2000	Pittsburgh Penguins	NHL	30	4	9	13	10	10	1	0	1	2
2000–01	HC Davos	NLA	43	12	26	38	49	4	1	0	1	2
2001–02	Foxwarren Falcons	NCHL	23	51	60	111	0	—	—	—	—	—
2002–03	Foxwarren Falcons	NCHL	23	47	64	111	6	—	—	—	—	—
2002–03	Île-des-Chênes North Stars	AC	—	—	—	—	—	4	4	5	9	10
2003–04	Foxwarren Falcons	NCHL	26	55	63	118	8	—	—	—	—	—
2004–05	Foxwarren Falcons	NCHL	16	23	41	64	4	—	—	—	—	—
2005–06	Foxwarren Falcons	NCHL	22	44	49	93	10	—	—	—	—	—
2006–07	Foxwarren Falcons	NCHL	21	28	48	76	14	—	—	—	—	—
2007–08	Foxwarren Falcons	NCHL	13	17	18	35	8	—	—	—	—	—
NHL totals			575	143	179	322	141	66	11	7	18	16

=== International ===
Year	Team	Event	GP	G	A	Pts	PIM
1991	Canada	WJC	7	3	3	6	2
1992	Canada	WC	6	2	1	3	6

== Awards ==
- WHL West Second All-Star Team – 1989
- WHL West First All-Star Team – 1991

Awards and achievements
Preceded by None	San Jose Sharks first-round draft pick 1991	Succeeded by Mike Rathje
