= Jon Klemm =

Canadian ice hockey player (born 1970)

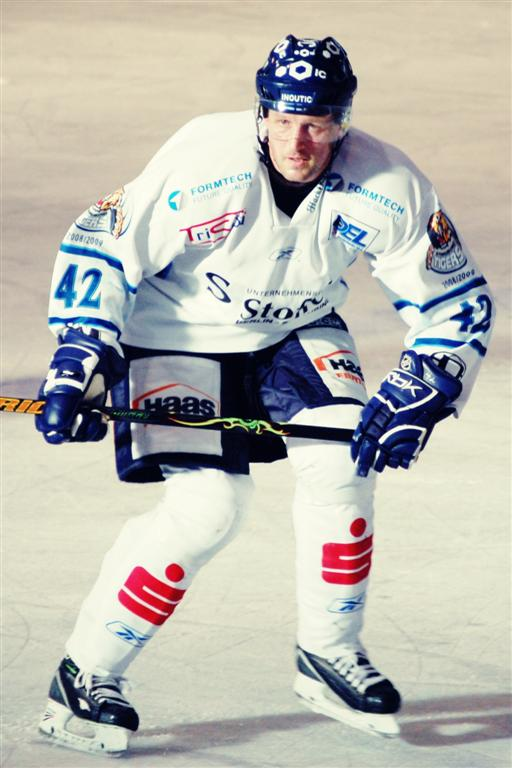
- Klemm with the Straubing Tigers in 2008
- Born: January 8, 1970 (age 56) Cranbrook, British Columbia, Canada
- Height: 6 ft 2 in (188 cm)
- Weight: 200 lb (91 kg; 14 st 4 lb)
- Position: Defence
- Shot: Right
- Played for: Quebec Nordiques; Colorado Avalanche; Chicago Blackhawks; Dallas Stars; Los Angeles Kings; Straubing Tigers
- NHL draft: Undrafted
- Playing career: 1991–2009

Jonathan Darryl Klemm (born January 8, 1970) is a Canadian former professional ice hockey defenceman who played in the National Hockey League. As of 2018, he was an associate coach for the Winnipeg Ice of the Western Hockey League, formerly known as the Kootenay Ice which relocated from Cranbrook, British Columbia to Winnipeg before the 2019–20 season.

== Playing career ==
After winning the Memorial Cup in 1991 as a Spokane Chief, Klemm signed as a free agent with the Quebec Nordiques on May 14, 1991. Klemm spent the next four years predominantly with Nordiques affiliates, the Halifax Citadels and the Cornwall Aces of the AHL before the Nords relocated to become the Colorado Avalanche. Klemm played his first full season in the NHL in the Avalanche's inaugural season in 1995-96, helping the Avs win their first Stanley Cup. Klemm spent the next 5 seasons firmly entrenched in the Avalanche defense corps and helped the Avalanche to their second Stanley Cup victory in the 2000–01 season.

With 10 years served in the Quebec/Colorado franchise and ranking second in all-time games played by Avalanche defensemen, Klemm left as a free agent and signed with the Chicago Blackhawks on July 1, 2001. Klemm was used in a larger role for the Blackhawks and played in a career high 82 games in the 2001–02 season, recording 20 points. In his third season with the rebuilding Blackhawks, Klemm was traded to the Dallas Stars for Stephane Robidas on November 17, 2003.

After the 2004 NHL lockout, Klemm helped the Stars return to the playoffs for the 2005–06 season, before losing at the hands of former team, the Avalanche, in the Western Conference Quarterfinals. In the 2006–07 season, Klemm was re-signed by the Stars on a club option on June 28, 2006. Klemm spent the majority of the season as a healthy reserve, however his final assist helped him reach a milestone 100 assists for his career. His assist coincidentally came on Mike Modano's milestone 500th goal in a 3-2 victory over the Philadelphia Flyers on March 13, 2007.

On August 20, 2007, Klemm signed for the Los Angeles Kings as a free agent. However prior to the 2007–08 season, on September 28, 2007, he was assigned to the Kings' AHL affiliate, the Manchester Monarchs, where he served as captain. In the 2008–09 season he played his final year of professional hockey in the German DEL for the Straubing Tigers.

On April 1, 2009 Klemm officially retired from the professional ranks. On May 26, 2009, Klemm returned to his junior team, the Spokane Chiefs, when he was named assistant coach for the 2009–10 season.

== Career statistics ==
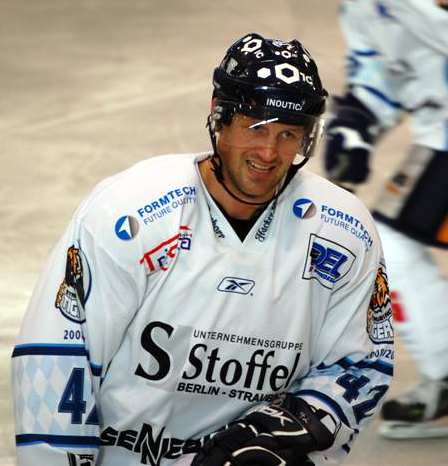

			Regular season					Playoffs
Season	Team	League	GP	G	A	Pts	PIM	GP	G	A	Pts	PIM
1987–88	Seattle Thunderbirds	WHL	68	6	7	13	24	—	—	—	—	—
1988–89	Seattle Thunderbirds	WHL	2	1	1	2	0	—	—	—	—	—
1988–89	Spokane Chiefs	WHL	66	6	34	40	42	—	—	—	—	—
1989–90	Spokane Chiefs	WHL	66	3	28	31	100	6	1	1	2	5
1990–91	Spokane Chiefs	WHL	72	7	58	65	65	15	3	6	9	8
1991–92	Halifax Citadels	AHL	70	6	13	19	40	—	—	—	—	—
1991–92	Quebec Nordiques	NHL	4	0	1	1	0	—	—	—	—	—
1992–93	Halifax Citadels	AHL	80	3	20	23	32	—	—	—	—	—
1993–94	Cornwall Aces	AHL	66	4	26	30	78	13	1	2	3	6
1993–94	Quebec Nordiques	NHL	7	0	0	0	4	—	—	—	—	—
1994–95	Cornwall Aces	AHL	65	6	13	19	84	—	—	—	—	—
1994–95	Quebec Nordiques	NHL	4	1	0	1	2	—	—	—	—	—
1995–96	Colorado Avalanche	NHL	56	3	12	15	20	15	2	1	3	0
1996–97	Colorado Avalanche	NHL	80	9	15	24	37	17	1	1	2	6
1997–98	Colorado Avalanche	NHL	67	6	8	14	30	4	0	0	0	0
1998–99	Colorado Avalanche	NHL	39	1	2	3	31	19	0	1	1	10
1999–00	Colorado Avalanche	NHL	73	5	7	12	34	17	2	1	3	9
2000–01	Colorado Avalanche	NHL	78	4	11	15	54	22	1	2	3	16
2001–02	Chicago Blackhawks	NHL	82	4	16	20	42	5	0	1	1	4
2002–03	Chicago Blackhawks	NHL	70	2	14	16	44	—	—	—	—	—
2003–04	Chicago Blackhawks	NHL	19	0	1	1	20	—	—	—	—	—
2003–04	Dallas Stars	NHL	58	2	4	6	24	—	—	—	—	—
2005–06	Dallas Stars	NHL	76	4	7	11	60	5	1	0	1	0
2006–07	Dallas Stars	NHL	38	1	2	3	24	1	0	0	0	2
2007–08	Manchester Monarchs	AHL	41	0	6	6	38	—	—	—	—	—
2007–08	Los Angeles Kings	NHL	22	0	0	0	10	—	—	—	—	—
2008–09	Straubing Tigers	DEL	51	4	12	16	93	—	—	—	—	—
NHL totals			773	42	100	142	436	105	7	7	14	47

== Awards and honours ==
Award	Year	Ref
WHL
West Second All-Star Team	1990–91	
NHL
Stanley Cup champion	1996, 2001	
