= Cal McGowan =

American ice hockey player

- Born: June 19, 1970 (age 55) Sidney, Nebraska, U.S.
- Height: 6 ft 1 in (185 cm)
- Weight: 190 lb (86 kg; 13 st 8 lb)
- Position: Center
- Shot: Left
- Played for: Kalamazoo Wings; Worcester IceCats; Binghamton Rangers; EC Bad Nauheim; Amarillo Rattlers; Florida Everblades
- National team: United States
- NHL draft: 70th overall, 1990; Minnesota North Stars
- Playing career: 1991–1999

Cal McGowan (born June 19, 1970) is an American former professional ice hockey player.

McGowan played junior hockey with the Kamloops Blazers in the Western Hockey League and with the Delta Flyers and Merritt Centennials of the British Columbia Hockey League, then went on to play eight seasons in the minor leagues before retiring as a professional player.

== Career statistics ==
			Regular season					Playoffs
Season	Team	League	GP	G	A	Pts	PIM	GP	G	A	Pts	PIM
1986–87	Delta Flyers	BCJHL	26	6	11	17	44	—	—	—	—	—
1986–87	Merritt Warriors	BCJHL	27	14	10	24	25	—	—	—	—	—
1987–88	Merritt Centennials	BCJHL	52	24	55	79	60	—	—	—	—	—
1988–89	Kamloops Blazers	WHL	72	21	31	52	44	16	4	2	6	24
1989–90	Kamloops Blazers	WHL	71	33	44	77	78	17	4	5	9	42
1990–91	Kamloops Blazers	WHL	71	58	81	139	147	12	7	7	14	24
1991–92	Kalamazoo Wings	IHL	77	13	30	43	52	1	0	0	0	2
1992–93	Kalamazoo Wings	IHL	78	18	42	60	62	—	—	—	—	—
1993–94	Kalamazoo Wings	IHL	49	9	18	27	48	4	0	0	0	2
1994–95	Kalamazoo Wings	IHL	1	0	0	0	0	—	—	—	—	—
1994–95	Worcester IceCats	AHL	64	22	21	43	28	—	—	—	—	—
1995–96	Binghamton Rangers	AHL	77	14	21	35	42	4	0	1	1	2
1996–97	EC Bad Nauheim	Germany2	49	16	34	50	69	—	—	—	—	—
1997–98	EC Bad Nauheim	Germany2	66	29	25	54	170	—	—	—	—	—
1998–99	Amarillo Rattlers	WPHL	58	8	28	36	20	—	—	—	—	—
1998–99	Florida Everblades	ECHL	5	2	0	2	14	—	—	—	—	—
AHL totals			141	36	42	78	70	4	0	1	1	2
IHL totals			205	40	90	130	162	5	0	0	0	4

== Awards ==
- WHL West First All-Star Team – 1991
