= CALS Raster file format =

Standard for the interchange of graphics data

The CALS Raster file format is a standard for the interchange of graphics data. It was developed by the United States Department of Defense (DoD) as part of the Continuous Acquisition and Life-cycle Support (CALS) initiative. It defines a standard storing raster (bit-mapped) image data, either uncompressed or compressed using CCITT Group 4 compression.
