= Cal (surname) =

Cal is a surname. Notable people with the surname include:

== Cal ==
- Anita M. Cal (born 1966), American writer
- David Cal (born 1982), Spanish sprint canoer
- Kaye Cal (born 1989), Filipino singer-songwriter
- Rafael Cal (born 1949), Mexican swimmer

== Çal ==
- Meryem Cennet Çal (born 2000), German-Turkish footballer

== See also ==
- Da Cal, surname
- Cal (given name)
