= CALS Table Model =

Standard for representing tables in SGML/XML

The CALS Table Model is a standard for representing tables in SGML/XML. It was developed as part of the Continuous Acquisition and Life-cycle Support (CALS) initiative by the United States Department of Defense.

== History and rationale ==
The CALS Table Model was developed by the Continuous Acquisition and Life-cycle Support (CALS) Industry Steering Group Electronic Publishing Committee (EPC).

The EPC subcommittee, of which Harvey Bingham was co-chair and a major contributor, designed the CALS Table Model in 1989–1990. The EPC was made up of industry and military service representatives. Some represented traditional military document printing agencies. Others represented electronic publishing organizations. SGML itself was new. At that time, the CALS intent for all their technical manuals was to use that document type definition (DTD) to achieve system-neutral interchange of content and structure.

Its basis was a minimal description and example of a table from the prior Mil-M-38784B specification for producing technical manuals. The incomplete specification of the semantics associated with the table model allowed too much freedom for vendor interpretation, and resulted in problems with interchange. SGML-Open, the former name of the Organization for the Advancement of Structured Information Standards (OASIS), surveyed the implementing vendors to identify differences as the initial step toward reaching a common interpretation. The next step was an updated CALS Table Model DTD and semantics. Both are now available from OASIS.

As implementations of the CALS Table Model were developed, a number of ambiguities and omissions were detected and reported to the EPC. The differences in interpretation had led to serious interoperability problems. To resolve these differences, OASIS identified a subset of the full CALS table model that had a high probability of successful interoperability among the OASIS vendor products. This subset is the Exchange Table Model DTD.

== Example ==
<table frame="none">
  <tgroup cols="2" colsep="0">
    <colspec colnum="1" colname="col1" colwidth="32mm"/>
    <colspec colnum="2" colname="col2" colwidth="132mm"/>
    <thead>
      <row>
        <entry valign="top"/>
        <entry valign="top">(IUPAC) name</entry>
      </row>
    </thead>
    <tbody>
      <row rowsep="0">
        <entry>pyro-EGTA</entry>
        <entry>2,2',2'',2'''-(2,2'-(1,2-phenylene bis(oxy))bis(ethane-2,1-diyl))
          bis(azanetriyl)tetraacetic acid</entry>
      </row>
      <row rowsep="0">
        <entry>EGTA</entry>
        <entry>ethylene glycol-bis(2-aminoethylether)-N,N,N',N'-tetraacetic acid</entry>
      </row>
      <row rowsep="0">
        <entry>EDTA</entry>
        <entry>2,2',2'',2'''-(ethane-1,2-diyldinitrilo)tetraacetic acid (ethylenediamine
          tetraacetic acid)</entry>
      </row>
      <row rowsep="0">
        <entry>AATA</entry>
        <entry>2,2'-(2-(2-(2-(bis(carboxymethyl)amino)ethoxy)ethoxy)
          phenylazanediyl)diacetic acid</entry>
      </row>
      <row rowsep="0">
        <entry>APTRA</entry>
        <entry>2-carboxymethoxy-aniline-N,N-diacetic acid</entry>
      </row>
      <row rowsep="0">
        <entry>BAPTA</entry>
        <entry>1,2-bis(-2-aminophenoxy)ethane- N,N,N',N'-tetraacetic acid</entry>
      </row>
      <row rowsep="0">
        <entry>HIDA</entry>
        <entry>N-(2-hydroxyethyl)iminodiacetic acid</entry>
      </row>
      <row rowsep="0">
        <entry>Carboxyglutamate</entry>
        <entry>3-Aminopropane-1,1,3-tricarboxylic acid</entry>
      </row>
    </tbody>
  </tgroup>
</table>

== See also ==
- OASIS, a global consortium that develops data representation standards for use in computer software
