= College of Agriculture and Life Sciences =

College of Agriculture and Life Sciences (or College of Agricultural and Life Sciences) is the name of several colleges at different universities that offer instruction in agriculture and the life sciences.

- College of Agriculture and Life Sciences at the University of Arizona
- College of Agriculture, Forestry and Life Sciences at Clemson University
- College of Agriculture and Life Sciences at Cornell University
- College of Agriculture and Life Sciences at the University of Florida
- College of Agriculture and Life Sciences at the University of Idaho
- College of Agricultural and Life Sciences at the University of Wisconsin–Madison
- College of Agriculture and Life Sciences at Iowa State University
- College of Agriculture and Life Sciences at Kyungpook National University
- College of Agriculture and Life Sciences at Mississippi State University
- College of Agriculture and Life Sciences at North Carolina State University
- College of Agriculture and Life Sciences at Seoul National University
- College of Agriculture and Life Sciences at Texas A&M University
- College of Agriculture and Life Sciences at the University of Vermont
- College of Agriculture and Life Sciences at Virginia Tech
