= Continuous Acquisition and Life-cycle Support =

US Department of Defense initiative

Continuous Acquisition and Life-cycle Support (CALS) is a United States Department of Defense initiative for electronically capturing military documentation and linking related information.

The initiative has developed a number of standard specifications (protocols) for the exchange of electronic data with commercial suppliers. These standards are often referred to as simply "CALS". CALS standards have been adopted by several other allied nations.

The CALS initiative has endorsed IGES and STEP as formats for digital data.

CALS includes standards for electronic data interchange, electronic technical documentation, and guidelines for process improvement.

- The CALS Table Model is a DTD standard for representing tables in SGML/XML. (see also DocBook)
- The CALS Raster file format was developed in the mid-1980s to standardize on graphics data interchange for electronic publishing for the federal government.

CALS was known formerly as Computer-aided Acquisition and Logistic Support.
