= 1990–91 WHL season =

Junior ice hockey season

- League: Western Hockey League
- Sport: Ice hockey
- Teams: 14

Regular season
- Scotty Munro Memorial Trophy: Kamloops Blazers (4)
- Season MVP: Ray Whitney (Spokane Chiefs)
- Top scorer: Ray Whitney (Spokane Chiefs)

Playoffs
- Finals champions: Spokane Chiefs (1)
- Runners-up: Lethbridge Hurricanes

WHL seasons
- 1989–90 1991–92

1990–91 CHL season
- League: Canadian Hockey League
- Sport: Ice hockey
- Teams: 42

OHL

QMJHL

WHL

Memorial Cup
- Finals champions: Spokane Chiefs (WHL) (1st title)
- Runners-up: Drummondville Voltigeurs (QMJHL)

The 1990–91 WHL season was the 25th season of the Western Hockey League (WHL), featuring fourteen teams and a 72-game regular season. The Kamloops Blazers won their second consecutive Scotty Munro Memorial Trophy for posting the league's best regular season record. In the playoffs, the Spokane Chiefs defeated the Lethbridge Hurricanes to win the club's first President's Cup title, before going on to win the 1991 Memorial Cup tournament, becoming the second American club to win the championship.

== Regular season ==
=== Final standings ===
East Division
Pos	Team	Pld	W	L	T	GF	GA	Pts
1	x – Lethbridge Hurricanes	72	45	21	6	373	281	96
2	x – Medicine Hat Tigers	72	40	27	5	366	296	85
3	x – Swift Current Broncos	72	40	29	3	369	351	83
4	x – Prince Albert Raiders	72	38	29	5	337	284	81
5	x – Regina Pats	72	37	32	3	346	307	77
6	x – Moose Jaw Warriors	72	31	39	2	336	369	64
7	Saskatoon Blades	72	29	41	2	309	363	60
8	Brandon Wheat Kings	72	19	51	2	265	380	40

x – qualified for playoffs

West Division
Pos	Team	Pld	W	L	T	GF	GA	Pts
1	x – Kamloops Blazers	72	50	20	2	385	247	102
2	x – Spokane Chiefs	72	48	23	1	435	275	97
3	x – Seattle Thunderbirds	72	42	26	4	319	317	88
4	x – Tri-City Americans	72	36	32	4	404	386	76
5	Portland Winter Hawks	72	17	53	2	298	450	36
6	Victoria Cougars	72	10	59	3	201	437	23

x – qualified for playoffs

=== Scoring leaders ===
Note: GP = Games played; G = Goals; A = Assists; Pts = Points; PIM = Penalties in minutes

Player	Team	GP	G	A	Pts	PIM
Ray Whitney	Spokane Chiefs	72	67	118	185	36
Brian Sakic	Tri-City Americans	69	40	122	162	19
Cal McGowan	Kamloops Blazers	71	58	81	139	147
Pat Falloon	Spokane Chiefs	61	64	74	138	154
Jason Ruff	Lethbridge Hurricanes	66	61	75	136	154
Jason Miller	Medicine Hat Tigers	66	60	76	136	31
Brad Rubachuk	Lethbridge Hurricanes	70	64	68	132	237
Kyle Reeves	Tri-City Americans	63	89	40	129	146
Jeff Nelson	Prince Albert Raiders	72	46	74	120	58
Kimbi Daniels	Swift Current Broncos	69	54	64	118	68

== 1991 WHL Playoffs ==
First round
E1	Lethbridge	bye
E3	Swift Current	0
E6	Moose Jaw	3
E2	Medicine Hat	bye
E4	Prince Albert	0
E5	Regina	3

Division Semi-Finals
E1	Lethbridge	4
E6	Moose Jaw	1
E2	Medicine Hat	4
E5	Regina	1
W1	Kamloops	5
W4	Tri-City	2
W2	Spokane	5
W3	Seattle	1

Division Finals
E1	Lethbridge	4
E2	Medicine Hat	3
W1	Kamloops	0
W2	Spokane	5

WHL Championship
E1	Lethbridge	0
W2	Spokane	4

== All-Star game ==
On February 5, the East Division defeated the West Division 8–2 at Calgary, Alberta before a crowd of 7,473.

== WHL awards ==
Most Valuable Player - Four Broncos Memorial Trophy: Ray Whitney, Spokane Chiefs
Scholastic Player of the Year - Daryl K. (Doc) Seaman Trophy: Scott Niedermayer, Kamloops Blazers
Top Scorer - Bob Clarke Trophy: Ray Whitney, Spokane Chiefs
Most Sportsmanlike Player - Brad Hornung Trophy: Pat Falloon, Spokane Chiefs
Top Defenseman - Bill Hunter Trophy: Darryl Sydor, Kamloops Blazers
Rookie of the Year - Jim Piggott Memorial Trophy: Donevan Hextall, Prince Albert Raiders
Top Goaltender - Del Wilson Trophy: Jamie McLennan, Lethbridge Hurricanes
Coach of the Year - Dunc McCallum Memorial Trophy: Tom Renney, Kamloops Blazers
Executive of the Year - Lloyd Saunders Memorial Trophy: Bob Brown, Kamloops Blazers
Regular season champions - Scotty Munro Memorial Trophy: Kamloops Blazers
Marketing/Public Relations Award - St. Clair Group Trophy: Bill Lee, Seattle Thunderbirds
WHL Plus-Minus Award: Frank Evans, Spokane Chiefs

== All-Star teams ==
East Division
	First Team		Second Team	
Goal	Jamie McLennan	Lethbridge Hurricanes	Chris Osgood	Medicine Hat Tigers
Defense	Troy Neumeier	Prince Albert Raiders	Brent Thompson	Medicine Hat Tigers
Defense	Jamie Heward	Regina Pats	Darcy Werenka	Lethbridge Hurricanes
Center	Mike Sillinger	Regina Pats	Jeff Nelson	Prince Albert Raiders
Left Wing	Jason Ruff	Lethbridge Hurricanes	Jason Miller	Medicine Hat Tigers
Right Wing	Brian Pellerin	Prince Albert Raiders	Kevin St. Jacques	Lethbridge Hurricanes
West Division
	First Team		Second Team	
Goal	Corey Hirsch	Kamloops Blazers	Scott Bailey	Spokane Chiefs
Defense	Darryl Sydor	Kamloops Blazers	Vince Boe	Seattle Thunderbirds
Defense	Scott Niedermayer	Kamloops Blazers	Jon Klemm	Spokane Chiefs
Center	Cal McGowan (tied)	Kamloops Blazers	Douglas Barrault	Seattle Thunderbirds
Center	Ray Whitney (tied)	Spokane Chiefs	-	-
Left Wing	Brian Sakic	Tri-City Americans	Murray Duval	Kamloops Blazers
Right Wing	Pat Falloon	Spokane Chiefs	Kyle Reeves	Tri-City Americans

== See also ==
- 1990–91 OHL season
- 1990–91 QMJHL season
- 1991 NHL entry draft
- 1990 in sports
- 1991 in sports

Preceded by 1989–90 WHL season	WHL seasons	Succeeded by 1991–92 WHL season
