= 2000–01 WHL season =

Junior ice hockey season

- League: Western Hockey League
- Sport: Ice hockey
- Teams: 18

Regular season
- Scotty Munro Memorial Trophy: Red Deer Rebels (1)
- Season MVP: Justin Mapletoft (Red Deer Rebels)
- Top scorer: Justin Mapletoft (Red Deer Rebels)

Playoffs
- Playoffs MVP: Shane Bendera (Rebels)
- Finals champions: Red Deer Rebels (1)
- Runners-up: Portland Winter Hawks

WHL seasons
- 1999–2000 2001–02

2000–01 CHL season
- League: Canadian Hockey League
- Sport: Hockey
- Duration: OHL; September 2000 – March 2001; QMJHL; September 2000 – March 2001; WHL; September 2000 – March 2001
- Teams: 60
- TV partner(s): RDS; Rogers Sportsnet; Rogers TV; Shaw TV
- Season MVP: Simon Gamache (Val-d'Or Foreurs) (QMJHL)
- Top scorer: Simon Gamache (Val-d'Or Foreurs) (QMJHL)

Memorial Cup
- Finals champions: Red Deer Rebels (WHL) (1st title)
- Runners-up: Val-d'Or Foreurs (QMJHL)

The 2000–01 WHL season was the 35th season of the Western Hockey League (WHL). The season featured eighteen teams completing a 72-game season. The Red Deer Rebels won both the Scotty Munro Memorial Trophy, for best regular season record, and the President's Cup as playoff champions, both for the first time in team history. The latter earned the Rebels a berth in the 2001 Memorial Cup tournament, hosted by the Regina Pats, where the Rebels finished their season by winning the national title.

== Regular season ==
Map of WHL, 1998–97 to 2000–01
East Division
Central Division
West Division

=== Final standings ===
East Division
Pos	Team	Pld	W	L	T	OTL	GF	GA	Pts
1	x – Swift Current Broncos	72	43	20	7	2	275	215	95
2	x – Regina Pats	72	40	27	3	2	285	242	85
3	x – Moose Jaw Warriors	72	34	29	4	5	287	291	77
4	x – Brandon Wheat Kings	72	32	32	5	3	244	242	72
5	Saskatoon Blades	72	19	43	5	5	193	265	48
6	Prince Albert Raiders	72	18	47	3	4	204	348	43

x – qualified for playoffs

Central Division
Pos	Team	Pld	W	L	T	OTL	GF	GA	Pts
1	x – Red Deer Rebels	72	54	12	3	3	304	168	114
2	x – Kootenay Ice	72	45	17	4	6	286	213	100
3	x – Calgary Hitmen	72	37	27	5	3	284	250	82
4	x – Lethbridge Hurricanes	72	29	35	4	4	200	229	66
5	Medicine Hat Tigers	73	24	40	5	4	271	316	57

x – qualified for playoffs

West Division
Pos	Team	Pld	W	L	T	OTL	GF	GA	Pts
1	x – Kelowna Rockets	72	37	23	7	5	259	240	86
2	x – Portland Winter Hawks	72	37	27	5	3	244	237	82
3	x – Kamloops Blazers	72	35	28	7	2	289	274	79
4	x – Spokane Chiefs	72	35	28	7	2	242	219	79
5	x – Prince George Cougars	72	31	33	4	4	242	266	70
6	x – Seattle Thunderbirds	72	30	33	8	1	262	299	69
7	Tri-City Americans	72	21	36	8	7	217	284	57

x – qualified for playoffs

=== Scoring leaders ===
Note: GP = Games played; G = Goals; A = Assists; Pts = Points; PIM = Penalties in minutes

Player	Team	GP	G	A	Pts	PIM
Justin Mapletoft	Red Deer Rebels	70	43	77	120	111
Layne Ulmer	Swift Current Broncos	68	63	56	119	75
Jared Aulin	Kamloops Blazers	70	31	77	108	62
Jarret Stoll	Kootenay Ice	62	40	66	106	105
Blake Evans	Tri-City/Regina	67	52	50	102	120
Kyle Wanvig	Red Deer Rebels	69	55	46	101	202
Konstantin Panov	Kamloops Blazers	69	44	56	100	52
Jordan Krestanovich	Calgary Hitmen	70	40	60	100	32
Nathan Barrett	Lethbridge Hurricanes	70	46	53	99	66
Rory McDade	Kelowna Rockets	72	28	70	98	50

=== Leading goaltenders ===
Note: GP = Games played; Min = Minutes played; W = Wins; L = Losses; T = Ties; GA = Goals against; SO = Total shutouts; SV% = Save percentage; GAA = Goals against average

Player	Team	GP	Min	W	L	T	GA	SO	SV%	GAA
Shane Bendera	Red Deer Rebels	45	2604	32	8	2	107	5	.903	2.47
B. J. Boxma	Kootenay/Swift Current	48	2791	28	15	2	123	0	.903	2.64
Dan Blackburn	Kootenay Ice	50	2924	33	14	2	135	1	.907	2.77
Michael Garnett	Red Deer/Saskatoon	49	2640	21	22	3	122	4	.902	2.77
Joel Martin	Lethbridge Hurricanes	44	2352	17	18	1	107	2	.884	2.88

== Playoffs ==
Conference quarterfinals
C1	Red Deer	4
C4	Lethbridge	1
E1	Swift Current	4
E4	Brandon	2
E2	Regina	2
C3	Calgary	4
C2	Kootenay	4
E3	Moose Jaw	0
W1	Kelowna	2
W6	Seattle	4
W2	Portland	4
W5	Prince George	2
W3	Kamloops	0
W4	Spokane	4

Conference semifinals
C1	Red Deer	4
C3	Calgary	2
E1	Swift Current	4
C2	Kootenay	3
W4	Spokane	3
W6	Seattle	0
W2	Portland	bye

Conference finals
C1	Red Deer	4
E1	Swift Current	2
W2	Portland	4
W4	Spokane	1

Finals
C1	Red Deer	4
W2	Portland	1

=== Eastern Conference ===
==== (C1) Red Deer Rebels vs. (C4) Lethbridge Hurricanes ====
March 23	Red Deer Rebels	2 – 3	OT	Lethbridge Hurricanes	ENMAX Centrium
16:45 - pp - Kyle Wanvig (1)		First period		No scoring
8:57 - Kyle Wanvig (2)		Second period		Martin Podlešák (1) - 19:01
No scoring		Third period		Tomáš Kopecký (1) - 13:25
No scoring		First overtime period		Brian Patterson (1) - 7:46
Shane Bendera (19 saves / 22 shots)		Goalie stats		Blake Ward (30 saves / 32 shots)

March 24	Red Deer Rebels	5 – 0	Lethbridge Hurricanes	ENMAX Centrium
12:11 - Jeff Smith (1)		First period	No scoring
2:54 - Doug Lynch (1); 5:53 - Andrew Bergen (1)		Second period	No scoring
3:09 - pp - Andrew Bergen (2); 8:38 - sh - Boyd Gordon (1)		Third period	No scoring
Shane Bendera (21 saves / 21 shots)		Goalie stats	Blake Ward (28 saves / 33 shots); Joel Martin (5 saves / 5 shots)

March 27	Lethbridge Hurricanes	1 – 6	Red Deer Rebels	ENMAX Centre
7:55 - Nathan Barrett (1)		First period	Ross Lupaschuk (1) - pp - 4:58; Justin Mapletoft (1) - pp - 6:26; Justin Mapletoft (2) - pp - 16:16; Martin Erat (1) - pp - 17:29
No scoring		Second period	Andrew Bergen (3) - sh - 19:24
No scoring		Third period	Diarmuid Kelly (1) - pp - 11:17
Blake Ward (30 saves / 36 shots)		Goalie stats	Shane Bendera (21 saves / 22 shots)

March 28	Lethbridge Hurricanes	0 – 6	Red Deer Rebels	ENMAX Centre
No scoring		First period	Justin Mapletoft (3) - pp - 11:02; Martin Erat (2) - 11:44; Devin Franco (1) - 18:37
No scoring		Second period	No scoring
No scoring		Third period	Justin Mapletoft (4) - 4:11; Kyle Wanvig (3) - pp - 8:49; Boyd Gordon (2) - pp - 11:31
Joel Martin (27 saves / 33 shots)		Goalie stats	Shane Bendera (10 saves / 10 shots)

March 30	Red Deer Rebels	7 – 2	Lethbridge Hurricanes	ENMAX Centrium
2:59 - Justin Mapletoft (5); 7:01 - Martin Erat (3); 11:15 - pp - Ross Lupaschuk (2); 18:08 - pp - Justin Mapletoft (6)		First period	Brett O'Malley (1) - 5:16
10:01 - Jeff Smith (2); 14:52 - Justin Mapletoft (7); 19:18 - pp - Martin Erat (4)		Second period	Warren McCutcheon (1) - pp - 7:34
No scoring		Third period	No scoring
Shane Bendera (10 saves / 12 shots)		Goalie stats	Blake Ward (33 saves / 40 shots)

Red Deer wins series 4 – 1

==== (E1) Swift Current Broncos vs. (E4) Brandon Wheat Kings ====
March 23	Swift Current Broncos	0 – 3	Brandon Wheat Kings	Centennial Civic Centre

March 24	Swift Current Broncos	4 – 2	Brandon Wheat Kings	Centennial Civic Centre

March 26	Brandon Wheat Kings	3 – 4	OT	Swift Current Broncos	Keystone Arena

March 27	Brandon Wheat Kings	2 – 3	Swift Current Broncos	Keystone Arena

March 30	Swift Current Broncos	2 – 5	Brandon Wheat Kings	Centennial Civic Centre

April 2	Brandon Wheat Kings	2 – 3	Swift Current Broncos	Keystone Arena

Swift Current wins series 4 – 2

==== (E2) Regina Pats vs. (C3) Calgary Hitmen ====
March 23	Regina Pats	5 – 2	Calgary Hitmen	Regina Agridome
9:09 - pp - Filip Novak (1); 12:12 - Blake Evans (1)		First period	Matt Kinch (1) - pp - 18:18
No scoring		Second period	Anton Bader (1) - 1:48
4:47 - Blake Evans (2); 9:26 - pp - Garth Murray (1); 19:22 - en - Brett Lysak (1)		Third period	No scoring
Donald Choukalos (19 saves / 21 shots); Chad Davidson (12 saves / 12 shots)		Goalie stats	Brady Block (32 saves / 36 shots)

March 24	Regina Pats	1 – 4	Calgary Hitmen	Regina Agridome
No scoring		First period	Pavel Brendl (1) - sh - 14:26; Sean McAslan (1) - 19:49
No scoring		Second period	Sean McAslan (2) - 5:54; Brandon Segal (1) - 7:56
9:36 - Curtis Austring (1)		Third period	No scoring
Donald Choukalos (28 saves / 32 shots)		Goalie stats	Brady Block (30 saves / 31 shots)

March 26	Calgary Hitmen	4 – 3	OT	Regina Pats	Pengrowth Saddledome
2:05 - pp - Pavel Brendl (2)		First period		No scoring
19:51 - pp - Owen Fussey (1)		Second period		Brett Lysak (2) - 3:30; Karel Mošovský (1) - pp - 10:00
12:24 - Shaun Norrie (1)		Third period		Blake Evans (3) - 18:12
9:08 - Johnny Boychuk (1)		First overtime period		No scoring
Brady Block (34 saves / 37 shots)		Goalie stats		Donald Choukalos (23 saves / 27 shots)

March 28	Calgary Hitmen	7 – 2	Regina Pats	Pengrowth Saddledome
6:54 - Jordan Krestanovich (1); 18:49 - pp - Jordan Krestanovich (2)		First period	Curtis Austring (2) - 2:12; Brett Lysak (3) - pp - 5:35
6:10 - sh - Sean McAslan (3); 11:06 - Pavel Brendl (3)		Second period	No scoring
3:41 - Robin Gomez (1); 6:44 - Robin Gomez (2); 19:25 - pp - Robin Gomez (3)		Third period	No scoring
Brady Block (20 saves / 22 shots)		Goalie stats	Donald Choukalos (15 saves / 18 shots); Chad Davidson (17 saves / 21 shots)

March 29	Regina Pats	4 – 1	Calgary Hitmen	Regina Agridome
No scoring		First period	No scoring
11:59 - pp - Blake Evans (4)		Second period	No scoring
8:24 - Curtis Austring (3); 15:44 - Kevin Korol (1); 19:47 - en - Brett Lysak (4)		Third period	Robin Gomez (4) - 3:24
Donald Choukalos (26 saves / 27 shots)		Goalie stats	Brady Block (27 saves / 30 shots)

April 1	Calgary Hitmen	4 – 3	Regina Pats	Pengrowth Saddledome
14:18 - Jordan Krestanovich (3)		First period	Blake Evans (5) - pp - 16:22
0:40 - pp - Matt Kinch (2)		Second period	Blake Evans (6) - 10:35; Brett Lysak (5) - pp - 11:46
13:12 - Pavel Brendl (4); 19:45 - Pavel Brendl (5)		Third period	No scoring
Brady Block (26 saves / 29 shots)		Goalie stats	Donald Choukalos (24 saves / 28 shots)

Calgary wins series 4 – 2

==== (C2) Kootenay Ice vs. (E3) Moose Jaw Warriors ====
March 23	Kootenay Ice	6 – 2	Moose Jaw Warriors	Cranbrook Recreational Complex
2:03 - pp - Jarret Stoll (1); 3:58 - Bret DeCecco (1); 7:35 - Zdeněk Blatný (1)		First period	No scoring
0:54 - Jason Jaffray (1)		Second period	Brian Sutherby (1) - pp - 7:24
12:18 - pp - Jason Jaffray (2); 17:32 - sh - Bret DeCecco (2)		Third period	Brian Sutherby (2) - 16:10
Dan Blackburn (29 saves / 31 shots)		Goalie stats	Tim Barlow (36 saves / 42 shots)

March 24	Kootenay Ice	4 – 0	Moose Jaw Warriors	Cranbrook Recreational Complex
No scoring		First period	No scoring
3:06 - Marek Svatoš (1)		Second period	No scoring
1:47 - pp - Jason Jaffray (3); 10:52 - Bret DeCecco (3); 19:26 - en - Jarret Stoll (2)		Third period	No scoring
Dan Blackburn (25 saves / 25 shots)		Goalie stats	Tim Barlow (32 saves / 35 shots)

March 27	Moose Jaw Warriors	3 – 8	Kootenay Ice	Moose Jaw Civic Centre
12:31 - pp - Shawn Limpright (1)		First period	Jarret Stoll (3) - 3:15; Zdeněk Blatný (2) - 17:09
16:23 - Nathan Paetsch (1)		Second period	Zdeněk Blatný (3) - pp - 2:42; Cole Fischer (1) - pp - 3:21; Aaron Rome (1) - pp - 12:18
0:24 - Steven Crampton (1)		Third period	Jason Jaffray (4) - 2:43; Jason Jaffray (5) - sh - 4:58; Patrick Iannone (1) - pp - 19:50
Tim Barlow (29 saves / 37 shots)		Goalie stats	Dan Blackburn (39 saves / 42 shots)

March 28	Moose Jaw Warriors	1 – 5	Kootenay Ice	Moose Jaw Civic Centre
No scoring		First period	Zdeněk Blatný (4) - pp - 1:47
7:20 - pp - Jarrett Thompson (1)		Second period	Zdeněk Blatný (5) - 9:36; Richard Hamula (1) - 10:11; Zdeněk Blatný (6) - 15:01
No scoring		Third period	Cole Fischer (2) - pp - 12:03
Tim Barlow (32 saves / 37 shots)		Goalie stats	Dan Blackburn (42 saves / 43 shots); Jeff Harvey (1 save / 1 shot)

Kootenay wins series 4 – 0

=== Western Conference ===
==== (W1) Kelowna Rockets vs. (W6) Seattle Thunderbirds ====
March 30	Kelowna Rockets	4 – 5	OT	Seattle Thunderbirds	Skyreach Place

March 31	Kelowna Rockets	5 – 0	Seattle Thunderbirds	Skyreach Place

April 5	Seattle Thunderbirds	5 – 1	Kelowna Rockets	KeyArena at Seattle Center

April 6	Seattle Thunderbirds	3 – 2	OT	Kelowna Rockets	KeyArena at Seattle Center

April 8	Kelowna Rockets	2 – 1	OT	Seattle Thunderbirds	Skyreach Place

April 9	Seattle Thunderbirds	4 – 2	Kelowna Rockets	KeyArena at Seattle Center

Seattle wins series 4 – 2

==== (W2) Portland Winter Hawks vs. (W5) Prince George Cougars ====
March 30	Portland Winter Hawks	5 – 2	Prince George Cougars	Memorial Coliseum
15:28 - Shawn Roed (1); 19:15 - pp - Paul Gaustad (1)		First period	No scoring
No scoring		Second period	Dan Baum (1) - 7:34; Mark Kitts (1) - 8:08
2:01 - Nick Marach (1); 12:11 - Josh Olson (1); 18:49 - en - Paul Gaustad (2)		Third period	No scoring
Lanny Ramage (30 saves / 32 shots)		Goalie stats	Billy Thompson (38 saves / 42 shots)

March 31	Portland Winter Hawks	3 – 2	OT	Prince George Cougars	Memorial Coliseum
No scoring		First period		No scoring
No scoring		Second period		No scoring
0:37 - Joey Hope (1); 5:04 - Dean Beuker (1)		Third period		Dan Hamhuis (1) - sh - 8:40; Blake Robson (1) - pp - 19:57
2:23 - Dean Beuker (2)		First overtime period		No scoring
Lanny Ramage (25 saves / 27 shots)		Goalie stats		Billy Thompson (43 saves / 46 shots)

April 3	Prince George Cougars	6 – 3	Portland Winter Hawks	CN Centre
6:51 - pp - Aaron Foster (1); 9:31 - pp - Berkeley Buchko (1); 19:52 - pp - Aaron Foster (2)		First period	Paul Gaustad (3) - pp - 14:44; Marcel Hossa (1) - pp - 19:25
5:37 - pp - Justin Cox (1); 7:57 - pp - Justin Cox (2); 15:12 - pp - Christian Chartier (1)		Second period	No scoring
No scoring		Third period	Matt Girling (1) - pp - 3:16
Billy Thompson (34 saves / 37 shots)		Goalie stats	Lanny Ramage (16 saves / 22 shots); Jomar Cruz (11 saves / 11 shots)

April 4	Prince George Cougars	4 – 3	OT	Portland Winter Hawks	CN Centre
7:37 - pp - Tim Wedderburn (1); 16:34 - pp - Aaron Foster (3)		First period		Paul Gaustad (4) - 19:10; Jozef Balej (1) - 19:34
2:07 - Berkeley Buchko (2)		Second period		Jozef Balej (2) - 4:07
No scoring		Third period		No scoring
3:31 - Derek Boogaard (1)		First overtime period		No scoring
Billy Thompson (34 saves / 37 shots)		Goalie stats		Lanny Ramage (17 saves / 21 shots)

April 8	Portland Winter Hawks	6 – 0	Prince George Cougars	Memorial Coliseum
5:07 - Nick Marach (2); 11:18 - Josh Olson (2)		First period	No scoring
1:36 - pp - Shawn Roed (2); 2:03 - Willy Glover (1)		Second period	No scoring
18:07 - Jozef Balej (3); 18:25 - Matt Girling (2)		Third period	No scoring
Lanny Ramage (20 saves / 20 shots)		Goalie stats	Billy Thompson (18 saves / 22 shots); Kyle Stanton (16 saves / 18 shots)

April 9	Prince George Cougars	3 – 5	Portland Winter Hawks	CN Centre
5:37 - sh - Dan Hamhuis (2); 13:14 - Justin Cox (3)		First period	Nick Marach (3) - 12:24
8:03 - pp - Berkeley Buchko (3)		Second period	Garrett Prosofsky (1) - pp - 12:55; Marcel Hossa (2) - pp - 18:03
No scoring		Third period	Marcel Hossa (3) - 4:36; Paul Gaustad (5) - 10:12
Billy Thompson (33 saves / 38 shots)		Goalie stats	Lanny Ramage (17 saves / 20 shots)

Portland wins series 4 – 2

==== (W3) Kamloops Blazers vs. (W4) Spokane Chiefs ====
March 30	Kamloops Blazers	1 – 3	Spokane Chiefs	Sport Mart Place
No scoring		First period	Scott Henkelman (1) - 13:30
No scoring		Second period	Justin Keller (1) - 0:51
7:26 - pp - Erik Christensen (1)		Third period	Joff Kehler (1) - sh - 14:26
Davis Parley (14 saves / 17 shots)		Goalie stats	Tyler MacKay (38 saves / 39 shots)

April 1	Kamloops Blazers	2 – 5	Spokane Chiefs	Sport Mart Place
18:20 - pp - Ryan Annesley (1)		First period	Shawn Thompson (1) - 5:45; Tim Krymusa (1) - pp - 15:37; Tim Krymusa (2) - 16:20
No scoring		Second period	No scoring
8:16 - Mark Rooneem (1)		Third period	David Boychuk (1) - 9:43; Tim Krymusa (3) 17:07
Davis Parley (29 saves / 34 shots)		Goalie stats	Tyler MacKay (29 saves / 31 shots)

April 3	Spokane Chiefs	9 – 2	Kamloops Blazers	Spokane Veterans Memorial Arena
2:15 - Roman Tvrdoň (1); 2:42 - Kurt Sauer (1); 13:30 - pp - Lynn Loyns (1)		First period	Konstantin Panov (1) - 5:16
12:25 - pp - Lynn Loyns (2); 15:40 - Mason Wallin (1)		Second period	Ryan Annesley (2) - pp - 6:41
1:24 - Mason Wallin (2); 8:48 - pp - Scott Henkelman (2); 11:44 - Ryan Thorpe (1); 13:06 - Ryan Thorpe (2)		Third period	No scoring
Tyler MacKay (24 saves / 26 shots); Barry Brust (1 save / 1 shot)		Goalie stats	Davis Parley (11 saves / 16 shots); Steve Belanger (11 saves / 15 shots)

April 8	Spokane Chiefs	3 – 0	Kamloops Blazers	Spokane Veterans Memorial Arena
7:52 - Roman Tvrdoň (2)		First period	No scoring
1:34 - Ryan Thorpe (3)		Second period	No scoring
5:48 - pp - Lynn Loyns (3)		Third period	No scoring
Tyler MacKay (24 saves / 24 shots)		Goalie stats	Davis Parley (17 saves / 20 shots)

Spokane wins series 4 – 0

=== Eastern Conference ===
==== (C1) Red Deer Rebels vs. (C3) Calgary Hitmen ====
April 6	Red Deer Rebels	1 – 4	Calgary Hitmen	ENMAX Centrium
No scoring		First period	Matt Kinch (3) - 4:20
6:07 - Colby Armstrong (1)		Second period	Pavel Brendl (6) - 1:18; Jordan Krestanovich (4) - pp - 6:57
No scoring		Third period	Shaun Sutter (1) - 4:07
Shane Bendera (26 saves / 30 shots)		Goalie stats	Brady Block (24 saves / 25 shots)

April 7	Red Deer Rebels	3 – 2	2OT	Calgary Hitmen	ENMAX Centrium
15:03 - Jeff Woywitka (1)		First period		Jordan Krestanovich (5) - 17:27; Kris Beech (1) - pp - 17:41
No scoring		Second period		No scoring
1:39 - Justin Mapletoft (8)		Third period		No scoring
13:30 - Colby Armstrong (2)		Second overtime period		No scoring
Shane Bendera (48 saves / 50 shots)		Goalie stats		Brady Block (38 saves / 41 shots)

April 11	Calgary Hitmen	2 – 6	Red Deer Rebels	Pengrowth Saddledome
15:02 - pp - Pavel Brendl (7)		First period	Andrew Bergen (4) - 9:34; Martin Erat (5) - sh - 16:00
No scoring		Second period	Bryce Thoma (1) - 10:09; Jim Vandermeer (1) - pp - 11:28; Martin Erat (6) - 13:05
19:21 - Owen Fussey (2)		Third period	Joel Stepp (1) - pp - 12:00
Brady Block (25 saves / 31 shots)		Goalie stats	Shane Bendera (24 saves / 26 shots)

April 12	Calgary Hitmen	3 – 1	Red Deer Rebels	Pengrowth Saddledome
13:03 - Robin Gomez (5)		First period	Martin Erat (7) - pp - 12:31
11:07 - pp - Rod Sarich (1)		Second period	No scoring
19:27 - en - Jordan Krestanovich (6)		Third period	No scoring
Brady Block (28 saves / 29 shots)		Goalie stats	Shane Bendera (35 saves / 37 shots)

April 14	Red Deer Rebels	4 – 3	Calgary Hitmen	ENMAX Centrium
9:25 - Martin Erat (8); 13:10 - Justin Mapletoft (9)		First period	Kris Beech (2) - sh - 2:04; Jordan Krestanovich (7) - 15:10
15:03 - Jeff Smith (3)		Second period	No scoring
3:51 - Martin Erat (9)		Third period	Jordan Krestanovich (8) - 18:04
Shane Bendera (25 saves / 28 shots)		Goalie stats	Brady Block (25 saves / 29 shots)

April 16	Calgary Hitmen	0 – 4	Red Deer Rebels	Pengrowth Saddledome
No scoring		First period	No scoring
No scoring		Second period	Martin Erat (10) - 7:16; Joel Stepp (2) - 11:13; Joel Stepp (3) - 15:33
No scoring		Third period	Andrew Bergen (5) - 14:35
Brady Block (25 saves / 29 shots)		Goalie stats	Shane Bendera (32 saves / 32 shots)

Red Deer wins series 4 – 2

==== (E1) Swift Current Broncos vs. (C2) Kootenay Ice ====
April 6	Kootenay Ice	7 – 1	Swift Current Broncos	Cranbrook Recreational Complex

April 7	Kootenay Ice	1 – 3	Swift Current Broncos	Cranbrook Recreational Complex

April 10	Swift Current Broncos	2 – 3	OT	Kootenay Ice	Centennial Civic Centre

April 11	Swift Current Broncos	3 – 2	2OT	Kootenay Ice	Centennial Civic Centre

April 13	Kootenay Ice	3 – 2	Swift Current Broncos	Cranbrook Recreational Complex

April 15	Swift Current Broncos	3 – 2	Kootenay Ice	Centennial Civic Centre

April 16	Kootenay Ice	2 – 3	Swift Current Broncos	Cranbrook Recreational Complex

Swift Current wins series 4 – 3

=== Western Conference ===
==== (W4) Spokane Chiefs vs. (W6) Seattle Thunderbirds ====
April 13	Spokane Chiefs	5 – 3	Seattle Thunderbirds	Spokane Veterans Memorial Arena

April 14	Spokane Chiefs	4 – 1	Seattle Thunderbirds	Spokane Veterans Memorial Arena

April 16	Seattle Thunderbirds	2 – 3	Spokane Chiefs	KeyArena at Seattle Center

Spokane wins series 3 – 0

=== Eastern Conference ===
==== (C1) Red Deer Rebels vs. (E1) Swift Current Broncos ====
April 20	Red Deer Rebels	3 – 4	OT	Swift Current Broncos	ENMAX Centrium
19:25 - Colby Armstrong (3)		First period		No scoring
6:15 - Joel Stepp (4)		Second period		Duncan Milroy (8) - pp - 8:42
11:40 - Justin Mapletoft (10)		Third period		Tim Smith (8) - 3:02; Layne Ulmer (4) - sh - 6:31
No scoring		First overtime period		Duncan Milroy (9) - 12:15
Shane Bendera (17 saves / 21 shots)		Goalie stats		B.J. Boxma (30 saves / 33 shots)

April 21	Red Deer Rebels	3 – 2	Swift Current Broncos	ENMAX Centrium
6:59 - pp - Kyle Wanvig (4); 16:13 - sh - Martin Erat (11)		First period	No scoring
5:42 - Jeff Smith (4)		Second period	Clay Thoring (1) - 8:48
No scoring		Third period	Tim Smith (9) - 0:26
Shane Bendera (28 saves / 30 shots)		Goalie stats	B.J. Boxma (27 saves / 30 shots)

April 24	Swift Current Broncos	3 – 2	OT	Red Deer Rebels	Centennial Civic Centre
15:09 - Layne Ulmer (5)		First period		Justin Mapletoft (11) - pp - 9:03
No scoring		Second period		Martin Erat (12) - sh - 6:59
15:51 - Nathan Smith (4)		Third period		No scoring
16:07 - Tim Smith (10)		First overtime period		No scoring
B.J. Boxma (40 saves / 42 shots)		Goalie stats		Shane Bendera (31 saves / 34 shots)

April 25	Swift Current Broncos	1 – 2	Red Deer Rebels	Centennial Civic Centre
No scoring		First period	No scoring
9:53 - Layne Ulmer (6)		Second period	Colby Armstrong (4) - 5:01
No scoring		Third period	Kyle Wanvig (5) - 13:17
B.J. Boxma (22 saves / 24 shots)		Goalie stats	Shane Bendera (19 saves / 20 shots)

April 27	Red Deer Rebels	3 – 1	Swift Current Broncos	ENMAX Centrium
15:58 - Martin Erat (13)		First period	No scoring
No scoring		Second period	Layne Ulmer (7) - pp - 5:26
3:09 - Kyle Wanvig (6); 5:21 - Ross Lupaschuk (3)		Third period	No scoring
Shane Bendera (24 saves / 25 shots)		Goalie stats	B.J. Boxma (35 saves / 38 shots)

April 2	Swift Current Broncos	0 – 4	Red Deer Rebels	Centennial Civic Centre
No scoring		First period	Martin Erat (14) - 5:30; Boyd Gordon (3) - 16:03
No scoring		Second period	Ross Lupaschuk (4) - pp - 0:52; Justin Mapletoft (12) - pp - 19:52
No scoring		Third period	No scoring
B.J. Boxma (20 saves / 24 shots)		Goalie stats	Shane Bendera (26 saves / 26 shots)

Red Deer wins series 4 – 2

==== (W2) Portland Winter Hawks vs. (W4) Spokane Chiefs ====
April 21	Portland Winter Hawks	3 – 0	Spokane Chiefs	Memorial Coliseum
No scoring		First period	No scoring
0:44 - Garrett Prosofsky (2); 5:12 - pp - Paul Gaustad (6)		Second period	No scoring
9:18 - Brad Priestlay (1)		Third period	No scoring
Lanny Ramage (32 saves / 32 shots)		Goalie stats	Tyler MacKay (19 saves / 22 shots)

April 22	Portland Winter Hawks	2 – 1	OT	Spokane Chiefs	Memorial Coliseum
No scoring		First period		No scoring
No scoring		Second period		No scoring
2:42 - pp - Jozef Balej (4)		Third period		Shawn Thompson (2) - 16:52
18:15 - Kevin Young (1)		First overtime period		No scoring
Lanny Ramage (36 saves / 37 shots)		Goalie stats		Tyler MacKay (38 saves / 40 shots)

April 24	Spokane Chiefs	1 – 2	Portland Winter Hawks	Spokane Veterans Memorial Arena
12:53 - pp - Lynn Loyns (6)		First period	No scoring
No scoring		Second period	Paul Gaustad (7) - 3:30; Shawn Roed (3) - 11:58
No scoring		Third period	No scoring
Tyler MacKay (21 saves / 23 shots)		Goalie stats	Lanny Ramage (31 saves / 32 shots)

April 25	Spokane Chiefs	3 – 0	Portland Winter Hawks	Spokane Veterans Memorial Arena
9:26 - Scott Henkelman (4)		First period	No scoring
3:38 - Scott Henkelman (5)		Second period	No scoring
16:01 - Tim Krymusa (4)		Third period	No scoring
Tyler MacKay (27 saves / 27 shots)		Goalie stats	Lanny Ramage (27 saves / 30 shots)

April 27	Portland Winter Hawks	4 – 1	Spokane Chiefs	Memorial Coliseum
9:57 - Willy Glover (2)		First period	No scoring
15:03 - Paul Gaustad (8); 17:30 - pp - Garrett Prosofsky (3)		Second period	No scoring
16:51 - sh - en - Paul Gaustad (9)		Third period	Roman Tvrdoň (5) - pp - 0:56
Lanny Ramage (30 saves / 31 shots)		Goalie stats	Tyler MacKay (42 saves / 45 shots)

Portland wins series 4 – 1

=== WHL Championship ===
==== (C1) Red Deer Rebels vs. (W2) Portland Winter Hawks ====
May 4	Red Deer Rebels	3 – 2	Portland Winter Hawks	ENMAX Centrium
13:02 - Justin Mapletoft (13)		First period	Josh Olson (3) - 9:17
15:35 - Darcy Robinson (1); 15:52 - Joel Stepp (5)		Second period	No scoring
No scoring		Third period	Jozef Balej (5) - pp - 2:00
Shane Bendera (26 saves / 28 shots)		Goalie stats	Lanny Ramage (14 saves / 17 shots)

May 5	Red Deer Rebels	5 – 4	Portland Winter Hawks	ENMAX Centrium
No scoring		First period	No scoring
12:56 - pp - Kyle Wanvig (7); 13:57 - sh - Colby Armstrong (5); 15:00 - sh - Joel Stepp (6); 18:54 - Martin Erat (15)		Second period	No scoring
7:02 - Andrew Bergen (6)		Third period	Josh Olson (4) - pp - 2:35; Dean Beuker (3) - pp - 11:17; Dan Hulak (1) - pp - 17:14; Jozef Balej (6) - 18:45
Shane Bendera (19 saves / 23 shots)		Goalie stats	Lanny Ramage (28 saves / 32 shots); Jomar Cruz (4 saves / 5 shots)

May 9	Portland Winter Hawks	3 – 2	OT	Red Deer Rebels	Memorial Coliseum
No scoring		First period		No scoring
10:16 - pp - Jesse Ferguson (1); 13:40 - pp - Marcel Hossa (4)		Second period		No scoring
No scoring		Third period		Ross Lupaschuk (5) - 2:50; Bryce Thoma (2) - pp - 11:08
6:33 - Josh Olson (5)		First overtime period		No scoring
Lanny Ramage (32 saves / 34 shots)		Goalie stats		Shane Bendera (21 saves / 24 shots)

May 11	Portland Winter Hawks	1 – 4	Red Deer Rebels	Memorial Coliseum
No scoring		First period	Andrew Bergen (7) - 7:11; Jim Vandermeer (2) - 16:43
No scoring		Second period	Colby Armstrong (6) - 18:25
5:06 - Garrett Prosofsky (4)		Third period	Jeff Woywitka (2) - 10:04
Lanny Ramage (31 saves / 35 shots)		Goalie stats	Shane Bendera (26 saves / 27 shots)

May 12	Portland Winter Hawks	3 – 4	OT	Red Deer Rebels	Memorial Coliseum
Paul Gaustad (10) - 7:08; Garrett Prosofsky (5) - 12:37		First period		5:57 - Jim Vandermeer (3)
No scoring		Second period		11:34 - Kyle Wanvig (8); 15:00 - pp - Kyle Wanvig (9)
Marcel Hossa (5) - 12:34		Third period		No scoring
No scoring		First overtime period		7:41 - Kyle Wanvig (10)
Lanny Ramage (27 saves / 31 shots)		Goalie stats		Shane Bendera (28 saves / 31 shots)

Red Deer wins series 4 – 1

== All-Star games ==
On January 24, the WHL Eastern All-stars were defeated by the OHL Western All-stars 5–2 at Guelph, Ontario before a crowd of 5,074.

On January 31, the WHL Western All-stars were defeated by the QMJHL Dilio All-stars 7–5 at Kamloops, British Columbia before a crowd of 4,103.

== WHL awards ==
Four Broncos Memorial Trophy (Player of the Year): Justin Mapletoft, Red Deer Rebels
Daryl K. (Doc) Seaman Trophy (Scholastic Player of the Year): Dan Hulak, Portland Winter Hawks
Scholastic Team of the Year: Prince Albert Raiders, Portland Winter Hawks
Bob Clarke Trophy (Top scorer): Justin Mapletoft, Red Deer Rebels
Brad Hornung Trophy (Most Sportsmanlike Player): Matt Kinch, Calgary Hitmen
Bill Hunter Trophy (Top Defenseman): Christian Chartier, Prince George Cougars
Jim Piggott Memorial Trophy (Rookie of the Year): Scottie Upshall, Kamloops Blazers
Del Wilson Trophy (Top Goaltender): Dan Blackburn, Kootenay Ice
Dunc McCallum Memorial Trophy (Coach of the Year): Brent Sutter, Red Deer Rebels
Lloyd Saunders Memorial Trophy (Executive of the Year): Brent Sutter, Red Deer Rebels
Scotty Munro Memorial Trophy (Best regular season record): Red Deer Rebels
Allen Paradice Memorial Trophy (Top Official): Kevin Acheson
St. Clair Group Trophy (Marketing/Public Relations Award): Mark Miles, Spokane Chiefs
Doug Wickenheiser Memorial Trophy (Humanitarian of the Year): Jim Vandermeer, Red Deer Rebels
WHL Plus-Minus Award: Jim Vandermeer, Red Deer Rebels
WHL Playoff Most Valuable Player: Shane Bendera, Red Deer Rebels

== All-Star teams ==
Eastern Conference
	First Team		Second Team	
Goal	Dan Blackburn	Kootenay Ice	Shane Bendera	Red Deer Rebels
Defense	Matt Kinch	Calgary Hitmen	Ross Lupaschuk	Red Deer Rebels
Defense	Jim Vandermeer	Red Deer Rebels	Filip Novak	Regina Pats
Forward	Justin Mapletoft	Red Deer Rebels	Nathan Barrett	Lethbridge Hurricanes
Forward	Layne Ulmer	Swift Current Broncos	Blake Evans	Regina Pats
Forward	Jarret Stoll	Kootenay Ice	Kyle Wanvig	Red Deer Rebels
Western Conference
	First Team		Second Team	
Goal	Tyler MacKay	Spokane Chiefs	Kevin Swanson	Kelowna Rockets
Defense	Christian Chartier	Prince George Cougars	Dan Hulak	Portland Winterhawks
Defense	Dan Hamhuis	Prince George Cougars	Gerard Dicaire	Seattle Thunderbirds
Forward	Jared Aulin	Kamloops Blazers	Brandin Cote	Spokane Chiefs
Forward	Jamie Lundmark	Seattle Thunderbirds	Marcel Hossa	Portland Winterhawks
Forward	Konstantin Panov	Kamloops Blazers	Rory McDade	Kelowna Rockets

- source: Western Hockey League press release

== See also ==
- 2001 NHL entry draft
- 2000 in sports
- 2001 in sports

Preceded by 1999–2000 WHL season	WHL seasons	Succeeded by 2001–02 WHL season
