= 2006–07 Serie A (ice hockey) season =

Italian professional ice hockey season

The 2006–07 Serie A season was the 73rd season of the Serie A, the top level of ice hockey in Italy. Nine teams participated in the league, and SG Cortina won the championship by defeating the HCJ Vipers Milano in the final.

== First phase ==
=== First round ===
	Team	Pts	GP	W	T	L	GF	GA
1.	HC Bolzano	22	16	10	2	4	71	51
2.	HCJ Milano Vipers	21	16	10	1	5	72	56
3.	Ritten Sport	21	16	8	5	3	56	45
4.	SG Cortina	19	16	7	5	4	57	44
5.	SG Pontebba	15	16	6	3	7	48	48
6.	HC Alleghe	15	16	6	3	7	56	62
7.	SHC Fassa	13	16	3	7	6	45	53
8.	HC Pustertal	11	16	3	5	8	43	53
9.	AS Asiago Hockey	7	16	2	3	11	42	78

=== Second round ===
	Team	Pts	GP	W	T	L	GF	GA
1.	HC Bolzano	43	32	19	5	8	135	109
2.	SG Cortina	39	32	15	9	8	116	89
3.	HCJ Milano Vipers	38	32	16	6	10	123	105
4.	Ritten Sport	36	32	14	8	10	110	93
5.	HC Alleghe	34	32	14	6	12	113	107
6.	SG Pontebba	32	32	12	8	12	96	98
7.	HC Pustertal	28	32	10	8	14	110	112
8.	SHC Fassa	25	32	8	8	15	92	114
9.	AS Asiago Hockey	13	32	4	5	23	76	148

== Second phase ==
=== Group A ===
	Team	Pts	GP	W	T	L	GF	GA	Pkt-GD
1.	SG Cortina	27	6	4	0	2	21	19	19
2.	HCJ Milano Vipers	27	6	4	0	2	22	22	19
3.	Ritten Sport	24	6	3	0	3	24	22	18
4.	HC Bolzano	23	6	1	0	5	15	19	21

=== Group B ===
	Team	Pts	GP	W	T	L	GF	GA	Pkt-GD
1.	HC Alleghe	29	8	6	0	2	40	31	17
2.	HC Pustertal	24	8	4	2	2	38	24	14
3.	SHC Fassa	23	8	5	1	2	27	22	12
4.	SG Pontebba	18	8	0	2	6	19	36	16
5.	AS Asiago Hockey	11	8	2	1	5	19	30	6

== Playoffs ==
=== Quarterfinals ===
Game	Date	Series 1		Series 2	
Game 1	10. March 2007	Ritten Sport - HC Pustertal	1:5	HC Bolzano - HC Alleghe	1:3
Game 2	13. March 2007	HC Pustertal - Ritten Sport	4:5 n.P.	HC Alleghe - HC Bolzano	3:4 OT
Game 3	15. March 2007	Ritten Sport - HC Pustertal	3:2 n.V.	HC Bolzano - HC Alleghe	3:7
Game 4	17. March 2007	HC Pustertal - Ritten Sport	1:4	HC Alleghe - HC Bolzano	1:3
Game 5	20. March 2007	nicht mehr benötigt		HC Bolzano - HC Alleghe	2:3

=== Semifinals ===
Game	Date	Series 1		Series 2	
Game 1	22. March 2007	HCJ Milano Vipers - HC Alleghe	1:2 n.V.	SG Cortina - Ritten Sport	7:1
Game 2	24. March 2007	HC Alleghe - HCJ Milano Vipers	0:1	Ritten Sport - SG Cortina	3:4
Game 3	27. March 2007	HCJ Milano Vipers - HC Alleghe	5:3	SG Cortina - Ritten Sport	4:5
Game 4	29. March 2007	HC Alleghe - HCJ Milano Vipers	3:0	Ritten Sport - SG Cortina	2:4
Game 5	31. March 2007	HCJ Milano Vipers - HC Alleghe	7:2	not played	

=== Final ===
3. April 2007	SG Cortina; 5:04 Nicholas Deschenes (J. K. Corupe); 22:54 Francesco Adami (F. Narcisi); 46:54 Nicholas Deschenes (J. K. Corupe, G. Marchetti); 50:58 Jonathan Kenneth Corupe (N. Deschenes, M. Smith); 59:59 Jonathan Kenneth Corupe	5:2 (1:1, 1:1, 3:0)	HCJ Milano Vipers; 12:46 Blake Evans (R. Savoia); 30:54 Ryan Savoia (M. Strazzabosco, B. Evans)
5. April 2007	HCJ Milano Vipers; 13:10 Brett Lysak (A. Helfer, R. Savoia); 23:24 Michele Strazzabosco (B. Lysak, R. Lehtonen); 25:39 Giulio Scandella (B. Evans, R. Lehtonen); 38:19 Ryan Savoia	4:2 (1:1, 3:0, 0:1)	SG Cortina; 12:38 Jonathan Kenneth Corupe (L. Da Corte, C. Wilde); 59:24 Enrico Chelodi (L. Ansoldi, G. Marchetti)
7. April 2007	SG Cortina; 17:11 Carl Wilde (L. Da Corte, M. Souza); 24:10 Mike Souza (J. K. Corupe); 27:22 Jonathan Kenneth Corupe (M. Souza, C. Wilde); 59:35 Nicholas Deschenes	4:3 (1:0, 2:2, 1:1)	HCJ Milano Vipers; 27:57 Armin Helfer (M. Chitarroni, G. Scandella); 39:09 Ryan Savoia (B. Evans, R. Christie); 54:41 Blake Evans (D. Felicetti, C. Borgatello)
10. April 2007	HCJ Milano Vipers; 46:36 Brett Lysak (B. Evans, R. Savoia); 53:59 Cristiano Borgatello (M. Chitarroni, D. Felicetti)	2:3 n.V. (0:0, 0:1, 2:1, 0:1)	SG Cortina; 24:33 Jonathan Kenneth Corupe; 49:35 Giorgio De Bettin (E. Chelodi, L. Ansoldi); 62:59 Jonathan Kenneth Corupe
