= Lynn Loyns =

Canadian ice hockey player

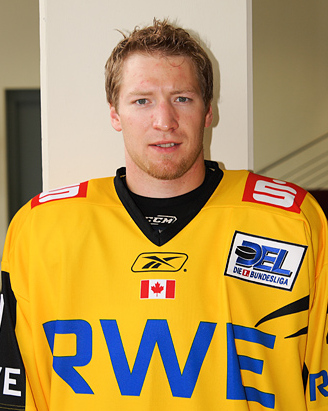
- Loyns with the Krefeld Pinguine in 2008
- Born: February 21, 1981 (age 44); Naicam, Saskatchewan, Canada
- Height: 5 ft 11 in (180 cm)
- Weight: 200 lb (91 kg; 14 st 4 lb)
- Position: Left wing
- Shot: Left
- Played for: San Jose Sharks; Calgary Flames; Krefeld Pinguine; Pustertal-Val Pusteria Wolves; EC VSV; DEG Metro Stars; Nottingham Panthers
- NHL draft: Undrafted
- Playing career: 2001–2014

Lynn Loyns (born February 21, 1981) is a Canadian former professional ice hockey left winger. A free agent signing by the San Jose Sharks in 2001, he played 34 games in the National Hockey League for the Sharks and Calgary Flames, scoring three goals and two assists in that time. The rest of his career, which lasted from 2001 to 2014, was spent in the minor American Hockey League and then in various European leagues.

== Personal life ==
Born in Naicam, Saskatchewan, Loyns married his sweetheart, Gia, on July 24, 2010 in Boston, MA, then held a reception in Calgary, Alberta a month later.

== Career statistics ==
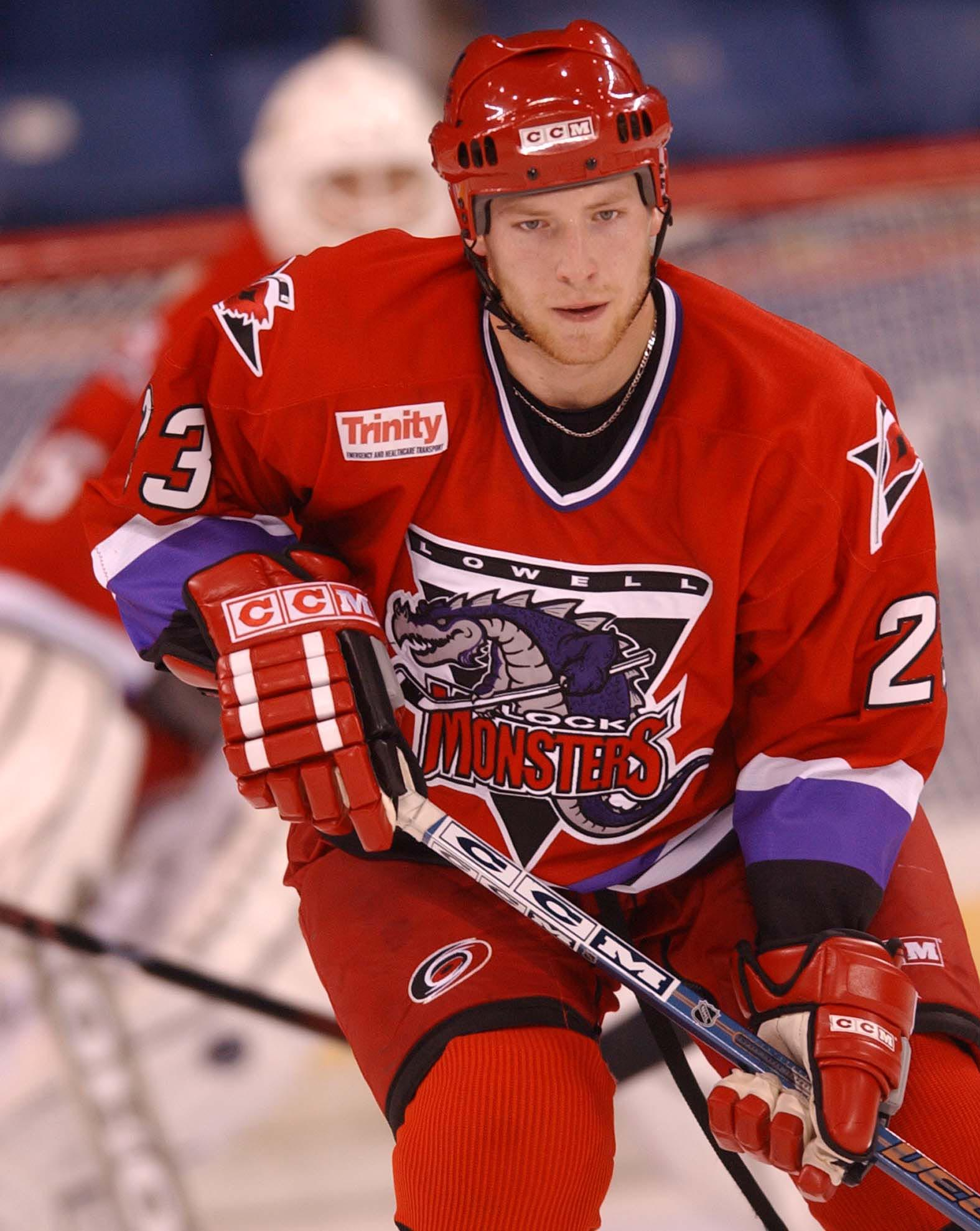
Loyns with the Lowell Lock Monsters in 2004

=== Regular season and playoffs ===
			Regular season					Playoffs
Season	Team	League	GP	G	A	Pts	PIM	GP	G	A	Pts	PIM
1996–97	Naicam Vikings	SHA	41	90	70	160	58	—	—	—	—	—
1997–98	Spokane Chiefs	WHL	49	1	12	13	8	13	1	4	5	2
1997–98	Spokane Chiefs	M-Cup	—	—	—	—	—	4	0	0	0	0
1998–99	Spokane Chiefs	WHL	72	20	30	50	43	—	—	—	—	—
1999–00	Spokane Chiefs	WHL	71	20	29	49	47	14	3	2	5	12
2000–01	Spokane Chiefs	WHL	66	31	43	74	81	12	6	12	18	18
2001–02	Cleveland Barons	AHL	76	9	9	18	81	—	—	—	—	—
2002–03	Cleveland Barons	AHL	36	7	8	15	39	—	—	—	—	—
2002–03	San Jose Sharks	NHL	19	3	0	3	19	—	—	—	—	—
2003–04	Cleveland Barons	AHL	30	5	9	14	40	—	—	—	—	—
2003–04	San Jose Sharks	NHL	2	0	0	0	0	—	—	—	—	—
2003–04	Lowell Lock Monsters	AHL	18	6	6	12	9	—	—	—	—	—
2003–04	Calgary Flames	NHL	12	0	2	2	2	—	—	—	—	—
2004–05	Lowell Lock Monsters	AHL	77	7	8	15	42	11	0	0	0	0
2005–06	Omaha Ak-Sar-Ben Knights	AHL	68	9	8	17	50	—	—	—	—	—
2005–06	Calgary Flames	NHL	1	0	0	0	0	—	—	—	—	—
2006–07	Krefeld Pinguine	DEL	51	16	14	30	26	2	1	0	1	6
2007–08	Krefeld Pinguine	DEL	43	12	16	28	51	—	—	—	—	—
2008–09	Krefeld Pinguine	DEL	52	13	16	29	52	7	1	2	3	8
2009–10	Krefeld Pinguine	DEL	26	6	3	9	14	—	—	—	—	—
2010–11	HC Pustertal	ITA	21	6	11	17	4	13	1	9	10	8
2011–12	EC VSV	EBEL	9	1	1	2	6	—	—	—	—	—
2011–12	DEG Metro Stars	DEL	35	3	4	7	4	7	0	0	0	0
2012–13	Ravensburg Towerstars	GER-2	14	2	4	6	34	—	—	—	—	—
2012–13	Nottingham Panthers	EIHL	35	8	13	21	6	2	0	0	0	0
AHL totals			305	43	48	91	261	11	0	0	0	0
NHL totals			34	3	2	5	21	—	—	—	—	—
