= Zdeněk Blatný =

Czech ice hockey player (born 1981)

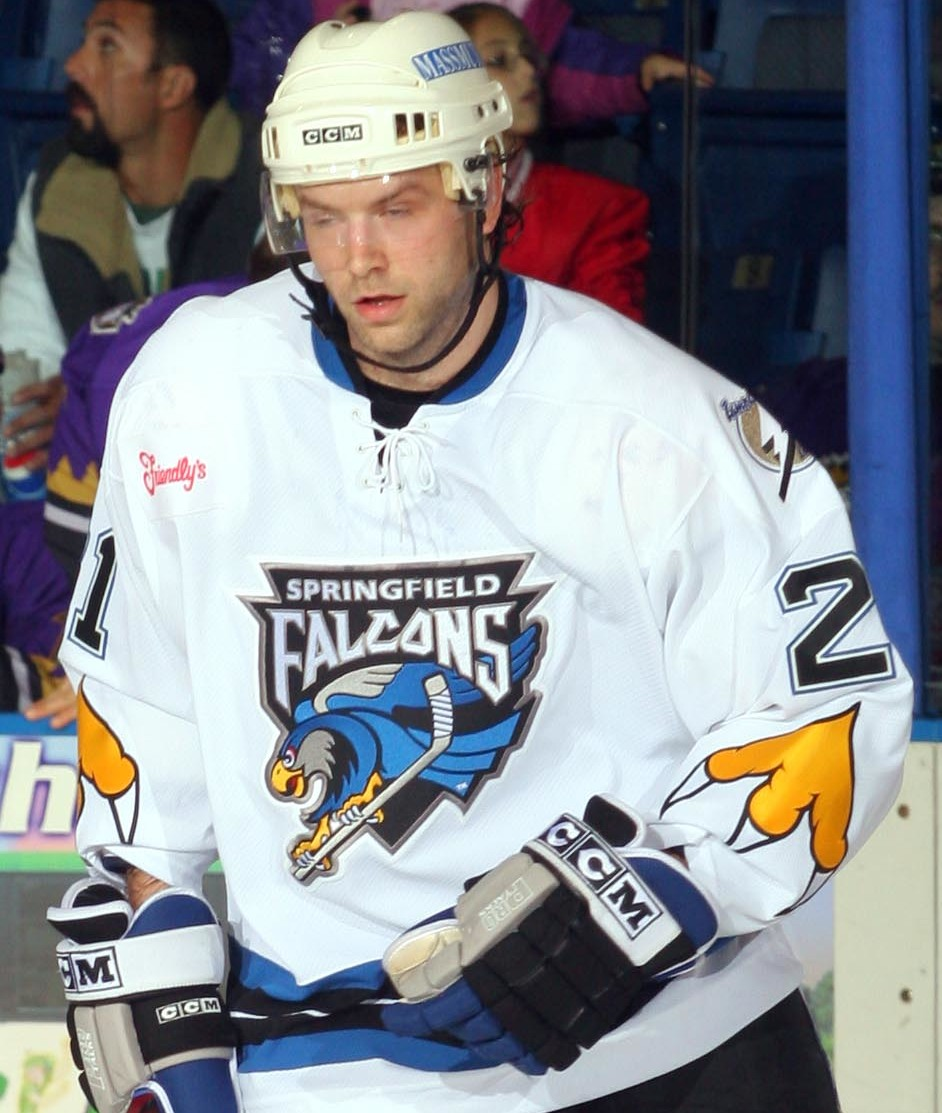
- Blatný with the Springfield Falcons in 2006
- Born: January 14, 1981 (age 45) Brno, Czechoslovakia
- Height: 6 ft 1 in (185 cm)
- Weight: 195 lb (88 kg; 13 st 13 lb)
- Position: Left wing
- Shot: Left
- Played for: Atlanta Thrashers; Lahti Pelicans; Orli Znojmo; Boston Bruins; Modo Hockey; HC Ambrì-Piotta; HC Bílí Tygři Liberec; Hannover Indians; HC Košice; HC Dukla Trenčín; Graz 99ers Vienna Capitals; Frederikshavn White Hawks; Dornbirner EC
- NHL draft: 68th overall, 1999; Atlanta Thrashers
- Playing career: 2001–2015

Zdeněk Blatný (born January 14, 1981) is a Czech former professional ice hockey left wing who played in the National Hockey League (NHL) with the Atlanta Thrashers and the Boston Bruins. He was drafted in the third round, 68th overall, by the Thrashers in the 1999 NHL entry draft.

== Playing career ==
After four seasons in the Western Hockey League, with the Seattle Thunderbirds and Kootenay Ice, Blatný joined the American Hockey League's Chicago Wolves for the 2001–02 season. He made his NHL debut with the Thrashers during the 2002–03 season, appearing in four games. He appeared in 16 more games with the Thrashers in the 2003–04 season, with the rest of his time during those seasons spent in the AHL with the Wolves.

Following the 2004–05 NHL lockout, during which Blatný played in Finland and in his native Czech Republic, he joined the Boston Bruins for the 2005–06 season. He appeared in five games with the Bruins before being traded in February 2006 to the Tampa Bay Lightning. He spent the remainder of the campaign with the Lightning's AHL affiliate, the Springfield Falcons.

In the last season under contract with the Lightning in 2006–07, Blatný continued with the Springfield Falcons, contributing with 13 points in 19 games before he opted to end his North American career and concentrate on a European career in signing with Swedish outfit Modo Hockey of the then Elitserien on January 12, 2007.

Blatný played in 7 various European leagues over the following 8 seasons, before ending his professional career during the 2014–15 season, last playing with Dornbirner EC of the Austrian Hockey League (EBEL).

== Career statistics ==
=== Regular season and playoffs ===
			Regular season					Playoffs
Season	Team	League	GP	G	A	Pts	PIM	GP	G	A	Pts	PIM
1997–98	HC Kometa Brno	U18	42	22	21	43	40	—	—	—	—	—
1998–99	Seattle Thunderbirds	WHL	44	18	15	33	25	11	4	0	4	24
1999–2000	Seattle Thunderbirds	WHL	7	4	5	9	12	—	—	—	—	—
1999–2000	Kootenay Ice	WHL	61	43	39	82	119	21	10	17	27	46
2000–01	Kootenay Ice	WHL	58	37	48	85	120	11	8	10	18	24
2001–02	Chicago Wolves	AHL	41	4	3	7	30	3	2	0	2	0
2001–02	Greenville Grrrowl	ECHL	12	5	5	10	17	9	2	8	10	14
2002–03	Chicago Wolves	AHL	72	12	9	21	62	9	0	2	2	20
2002–03	Atlanta Thrashers	NHL	4	0	0	0	0	—	—	—	—	—
2003–04	Chicago Wolves	AHL	61	11	23	34	115	10	0	4	4	24
2003–04	Atlanta Thrashers	NHL	16	3	0	3	6	—	—	—	—	—
2004–05	Lahti Pelicans	SM-l	9	1	1	2	32	—	—	—	—	—
2004–05	Orli Znojmo	ELH	15	3	4	7	28	—	—	—	—	—
2005–06	Providence Bruins	AHL	35	8	22	30	21	—	—	—	—	—
2005–06	Boston Bruins	NHL	5	0	0	0	2	—	—	—	—	—
2005–06	Springfield Falcons	AHL	31	14	15	29	20	—	—	—	—	—
2006–07	Springfield Falcons	AHL	19	5	8	13	18	—	—	—	—	—
2006–07	Modo Hockey	SEL	16	2	1	3	44	20	3	4	7	34
2007–08	HC Ambrì-Piotta	NLA	10	2	3	5	14	—	—	—	—	—
2007–08	HC Bílí Tygři Liberec	ELH	23	4	5	9	73	11	0	1	1	22
2008–09	HC Bílí Tygři Liberec	ELH	51	4	21	25	129	3	0	0	0	0
2008–09	HC Benátky nad Jizerou	Czech.1	1	1	1	2	2	—	—	—	—	—
2009–10	HC Bílí Tygři Liberec	ELH	50	7	8	15	42	15	0	1	1	37
2010–11	Hannover Indians	2. GBun	6	2	4	6	4	—	—	—	—	—
2010–11	HC Košice	Slovak	4	0	1	1	2	—	—	—	—	—
2010–11	HC Dukla Trenčín	Slovak	12	1	9	10	8	11	3	2	5	16
2011–12	Graz 99ers	EBEL	47	20	26	46	70	—	—	—	—	—
2012–13	Vienna Capitals	EBEL	33	8	8	16	27	—	—	—	—	—
2013–14	Orli Znojmo	EBEL	40	9	20	29	61	5	2	2	4	13
2014–15	Frederikshavn White Hawks	DEN	5	3	5	8	6	—	—	—	—	—
2014–15	Dornbirner EC	EBEL	25	8	2	10	53	—	—	—	—	—
NHL totals			25	3	0	3	8	—	—	—	—	—

Medal record

Representing Czech Republic

Ice hockey

World Junior Championships
Gold medal – first place	2001 Russia	

=== International ===
Year	Team	Event	Result	GP	G	A	Pts	PIM
2001	Czech Republic	WJC	1st place, gold medalist(s)	7	5	2	7	6
Junior totals				7	5	2	7	6

== Awards and honours ==
Award	Year
WHL East Second Team All-Star	1999–2000
