= Owen Fussey =

Canadian-British ice hockey player

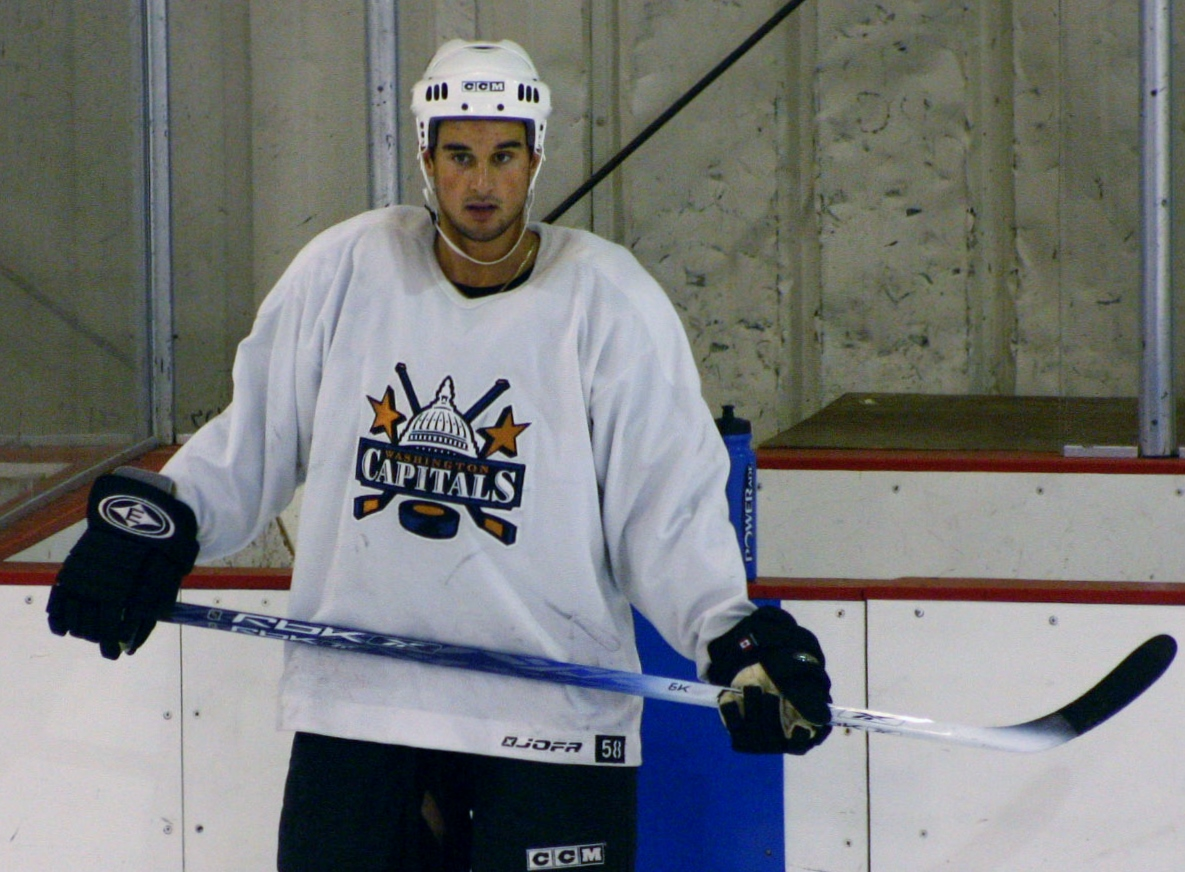
- Fussey in 2005
- Born: April 2, 1983 (age 43) Winnipeg, Manitoba, Canada
- Height: 6 ft 0 in (183 cm)
- Weight: 195 lb (88 kg; 13 st 13 lb)
- Position: Left wing
- Shot: Left
- Played for: Washington Capitals; HC Fassa; Edinburgh Capitals; Coventry Blaze
- National team: Great Britain
- NHL draft: 90th overall, 2001; Washington Capitals
- Playing career: 2003–2015

Owen Fussey (born April 2, 1983) is a Canadian-British former professional ice hockey forward. He was selected 90th overall in the 2001 NHL entry draft by the Washington Capitals and played four games in the National Hockey League with them during the 2003–04 season. The rest of his career, which lasted from 2003 to 2015, was spent in the minor leagues and then in Europe. Internationally, Fussey played for the British national team at the 2012 World Championship Division I tournament.

== Playing career ==
Fussey was born in Winnipeg, Manitoba. He spent four seasons in the Western Hockey League (WHL) with the Calgary Hitmen and Moose Jaw Warriors before moving to the American Hockey League (AHL) in 2003. That same season, he was called up to the National Hockey League (NHL) to play in four games for the Washington Capitals, in which he scored one point for an assist.

Fussey spent the next three seasons in the AHL, playing for the Portland Pirates, Hershey Bears (winning the Calder Cup in the 2005-06 season) and Toronto Marlies before moving to the ECHL in 2006, spending two seasons with the Columbia Inferno.

In 2008 Fussey moved to Europe to play in the Italian Serie A league for HC Fassa, and moved to Britain the following season with Edinburgh Capitals in the Elite Ice Hockey League (EIHL).

In 2010 Fussey was signed by Coventry Blaze, the then-reigning Elite League champions. In 2012, Fussey represented the Great Britain national team at the 2012 IIHF World Championship Division 1A.

After two years away from the game, Fussey returned in 2014 to sign for the Guildford Flames of the second-tier English Premier Ice Hockey League. He played 19 games for Guildford before he was released in December of the same year.

== Career statistics ==
=== Regular season and playoffs ===
			Regular season					Playoffs
Season	Team	League	GP	G	A	Pts	PIM	GP	G	A	Pts	PIM
1998–99	Winnipeg Warriors AAA	MMHL	40	38	33	71	62	—	—	—	—	—
1998–99	St. Boniface Saints	MJHL	4	3	0	3	4	—	—	—	—	—
1999–00	Calgary Hitmen	WHL	51	7	6	13	35	12	3	4	7	2
2000–01	Calgary Hitmen	WHL	48	15	10	25	33	12	2	1	3	6
2001–02	Calgary Hitmen	WHL	72	43	27	70	61	7	3	1	4	4
2002–03	Calgary Hitmen	WHL	39	17	18	35	31	—	—	—	—	—
2002–03	Moose Jaw Warriors	WHL	27	24	12	36	20	13	6	6	12	10
2003–04	Washington Capitals	NHL	4	0	1	1	0	—	—	—	—	—
2003–04	Portland Pirates	AHL	69	6	7	13	23	7	0	0	0	5
2004–05	Portland Pirates	AHL	71	14	12	26	26	—	—	—	—	—
2005–06	Hershey Bears	AHL	50	2	10	12	38	1	0	0	0	0
2006–07	Toronto Marlies	AHL	14	1	1	2	4	—	—	—	—	—
2006–07	Columbia Inferno	ECHL	53	25	20	45	41	—	—	—	—	—
2007–08	Columbia Inferno	ECHL	68	17	23	40	41	13	1	1	2	4
2008–09	HC Fassa	ITA	49	24	13	37	22	—	—	—	—	—
2009–10	Edinburgh Capitals	EIHL	49	35	31	66	30	2	0	1	1	0
2010–11	Coventry Blaze	EIHL	34	24	15	39	10	—	—	—	—	—
2011–12	Coventry Blaze	EIHL	53	35	28	63	34	2	1	0	1	2
2014–15	Guildford Flames	EPIHL	19	10	5	15	8	—	—	—	—	—
AHL totals			208	23	30	53	91	8	0	0	0	5
EIHL totals			128	90	72	162	70	4	1	1	2	2
NHL totals			4	0	1	1	0	—	—	—	—	—

=== International ===
Year	Team	Event	GP	G	A	Pts	PIM
2012	Great Britain	WC D1A	5	1	0	1	6
Senior totals			5	1	0	1	6
