= Justin Mapletoft =

Canadian ice hockey player

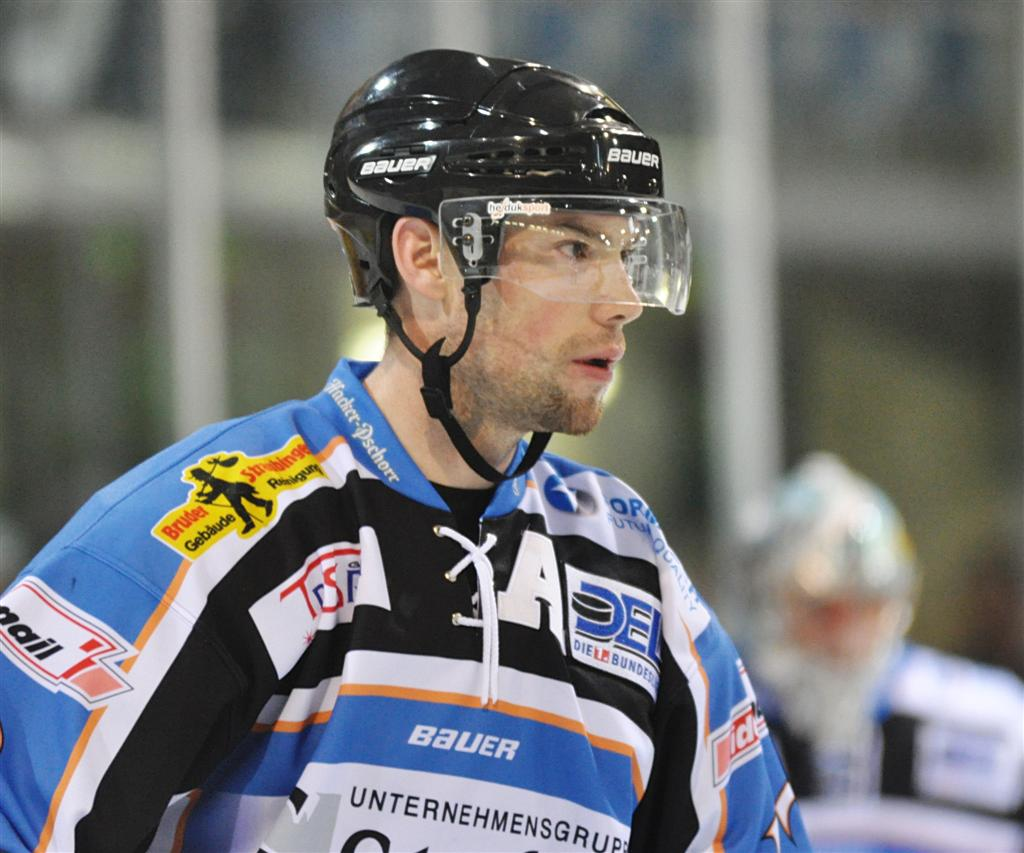
- Born: January 11, 1981 (age 45) Lloydminster, Saskatchewan, Canada
- Height: 6 ft 1 in (185 cm)
- Weight: 202 lb (92 kg; 14 st 6 lb)
- Position: Centre
- Shot: Left
- Played for: New York Islanders
- NHL draft: 130th overall, 1999; New York Islanders
- Playing career: 2001–2012

Justin Mapletoft (born January 11, 1981) is a Canadian former professional ice hockey centre. He was drafted by the New York Islanders in the 1999 NHL entry draft as their fifth-round pick, number 130 overall.

He played 38 NHL games with the Islanders in addition to his four seasons with the Bridgeport Sound Tigers in the AHL.

After being recommended by his Tigers linemate Sean Bergenheim, Mapletoft signed with Jokerit in the Finnish SM-liiga for the 2005–06 season, but after a disappointing early season, the team invoked a buyout clause in his contract at the beginning of November 2005, ending his season with Jokerit. He subsequently signed with Södertälje SK in the Swedish Elitserien. The following summer, he signed a one-year contract with the Ottawa Senators. He played for the EC VSV in the Austrian league in 2008/09.

He played two seasons for the Straubing Tigers of the Deutsche Eishockey Liga.

== Career statistics ==
			Regular season					Playoffs
Season	Team	League	GP	G	A	Pts	PIM	GP	G	A	Pts	PIM
1996–97	Red Deer Rebels	WHL	2	0	0	0	0	—	—	—	—	—
1997–98	Red Deer Rebels	WHL	65	9	4	13	41	5	1	0	1	0
1998–99	Red Deer Rebels	WHL	72	24	22	46	81	9	2	3	5	12
1999–2000	Red Deer Rebels	WHL	72	39	57	96	135	4	2	1	3	28
2000–01	Red Deer Rebels	WHL	70	43	77	120	111	22	13	21	34	59
2000–01	Red Deer Rebels	MC	—	—	—	—	—	4	2	2	4	4
2001–02	Bridgeport Sound Tigers	AHL	80	13	20	33	60	20	7	10	17	23
2002–03	Bridgeport Sound Tigers	AHL	63	13	26	39	47	7	1	2	3	6
2002–03	New York Islanders	NHL	11	2	2	4	2	2	0	0	0	0
2003–04	Bridgeport Sound Tigers	AHL	36	10	13	23	59	—	—	—	—	—
2003–04	New York Islanders	NHL	27	1	4	5	6	—	—	—	—	—
2004–05	Bridgeport Sound Tigers	AHL	61	11	24	35	51	—	—	—	—	—
2005–06	Jokerit	SM-l	18	1	3	4	8	—	—	—	—	—
2005–06	Södertälje SK	SEL	31	14	7	21	34	—	—	—	—	—
2006–07	Nürnberg Ice Tigers	DEL	10	2	3	5	2	13	2	4	6	10
2007–08	Binghamton Senators	AHL	78	18	22	40	77	—	—	—	—	—
2008–09	VSV EC	AUT	52	20	38	58	66	6	1	2	3	10
2009–10	Straubing Tigers	DEL	50	13	26	39	48	—	—	—	—	—
2010–11	Straubing Tigers	DEL	52	16	19	35	71	—	—	—	—	—
2011–12	SERC Wild Wings	DEU II	14	0	6	6	8	—	—	—	—	—
2011–12	HC Sierre	CHE II	2	1	2	3	0	—	—	—	—	—
2011–12	EHC Basel	CHE II	14	5	8	13	4	4	1	0	1	2
AHL totals			318	65	105	170	294	27	8	12	20	29
NHL totals			38	3	6	9	8	2	0	0	0	0
DEL totals			112	31	48	79	121	13	2	4	6	10

== Awards and honours ==
Award	Year
WHL East First Team All-Star	1999–2000
WHL East First Team All-Star	2000–01

Preceded by Brad Moran	Winner of the WHL Bob Clarke Trophy; 2001	Succeeded by Nathan Barrett
Preceded by Brad Moran	Winner of the WHL Four Broncos Memorial Trophy; 2001	Succeeded by Dan Hamhuis
