= Dan Blackburn =

Canadian ice hockey player (born 1983)

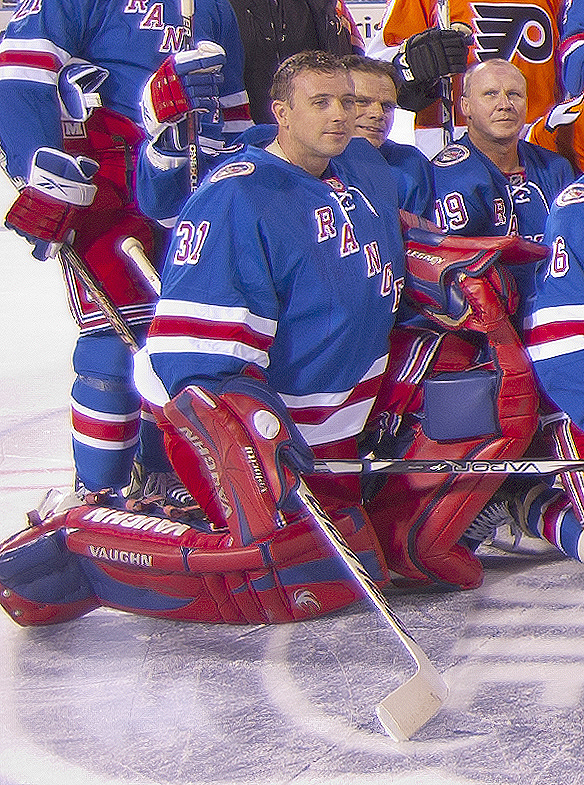
- Blackburn in 2012
- Born: May 20, 1983 (age 42) Montreal, Quebec, Canada
- Height: 6 ft 1 in (185 cm)
- Weight: 180 lb (82 kg; 12 st 12 lb)
- Position: Goaltender
- Caught: Left
- Played for: New York Rangers
- NHL draft: 10th overall, 2001; New York Rangers
- Playing career: 2001–2005

Daniel Clark Blackburn (born May 20, 1983) is a Canadian former professional ice hockey goaltender. He played 63 regular-season games for the New York Rangers of the National Hockey League (NHL), going 20–32–11 with 1 shutout.

== Minor league career ==
Born in Quebec, Blackburn moved to Canmore, Alberta as a teen and played major junior hockey with the Western Hockey League's Kootenay Ice in Cranbrook, British Columbia. In 2001, he was named the Canadian Hockey League's Goaltender of the Year. Blackburn was drafted by the New York Rangers in the first round of the 2001 NHL entry draft, 10th overall.

== NHL career ==
For most of 2001–02, Blackburn served as backup to longtime Rangers goalie, Mike Richter, playing in 31 games, a large total for a backup goaltender at the time. He was selected as the goaltender for the 2002 NHL All-Rookie Team and posted a 3.28 goals against average (GAA) and .898 save percentage.

With Richter out with a head injury, Blackburn recorded his only career shutout on November 7, 2002, in a 1–0 overtime win over the Calgary Flames. Blackburn dismissed concerns that the heavy workload would be too much for him by pointing out that he had endured a heavier workload in junior. However, after 17 consecutive starts, Blackburn eventually burned out, playing less effectively and tiring. It was becoming clear that Richter's difficulties with post-concussion syndrome were unlikely to abate, and that more help was needed. "We had to make a deal," Glen Sather claimed. "I did not want to see Danny lose his confidence and struggle, or for our team to struggle."

Sather traded for Nashville Predator Mike Dunham, an experienced goaltender, to let Blackburn develop at a consistent rate. Blackburn finished the 2002–03 season with a 3.17 GAA and a .890 save percentage.

== Injuries and retirement ==
A shoulder injury forced him into retirement in 2005.

He retired after missing the entire 2003–04 NHL season due to a nerve injury sustained just before training camp to his left shoulder due to a weightlifting mishap. He had nerve exploration surgery on March 31, 2004, then made an attempt to return to hockey, sporting a pair of blockers rather than the conventional blocker/catcher combination, as his injury rendered him incapable of rotating his glove hand. On February 1, 2005, he joined the Victoria Salmon Kings of the ECHL, going 3–9–0, with a 3.54 GAA in 12 games. On September 15, during the Rangers training camp, he suffered a strained MCL. Subsequently, Blackburn announced his retirement on September 25. Had Blackburn continued to attempt a comeback, he would have forfeited an insurance payout of approximately six million dollars.

After his retirement, Blackburn enrolled at Arizona State University. He later became the manager of business development for the Goaltender Development Institute. He currently resides in Dallas, Texas and Waltham, Massachusetts. When asked if he ever envisioned a return to hockey, he was quoted as saying, "Never, I doubt I will ever put goalie pads on again. I don't have interest in playing net." He also stated, "It's not bittersweet, you know what? I don't really miss it anymore - it's been such a long time. It was a chapter of my life and I'm on to the next....I don't have any regrets at all about what transpired or the way things happened for me. I really enjoy what I do now in the business world....From my point of view, I was really fortunate, even though I was only there for a couple of years. It really set up the rest of my life for all the things that I want to do, from there on out."

On December 31, 2011, Blackburn participated in the 2012 Winter Classic Alumni Game at Citizens Bank Park in Philadelphia, playing in goal for the Rangers alumni against the Philadelphia Flyers alumni.

== Awards and honours ==
Award	Year
WHL East Second Team All-Star	1999–2000
WHL East First Team All-Star	2000–01

== Career statistics ==
=== Regular season and playoffs ===
			Regular season									Playoffs
Season	Team	League	GP	W	L	T	MIN	GA	SO	GAA	SV%	GP	W	L	MIN	GA	SO	GAA	SV%
1997–98	Bow Valley Eagles	AJHL	20	9	6	1	1039	58	1	3.35	—	3	0	0	97	8	0	4.95	—
1998–99	Bow Valley Eagles	AJHL	38	7	19	6	1941	146	0	4.51	—	2	0	2	118	8	0	4.07	—
1999–00	Kootenay Ice	WHL	51	34	8	7	3004	126	3	2.52	.912	21	16	5	1272	43	2	2.03	.935
2000–01	Kootenay Ice	WHL	50	33	14	2	2922	135	1	2.77	.907	11	7	4	706	23	1	1.95	.939
2001–02	New York Rangers	NHL	31	12	16	0	1737	95	0	3.28	.898	—	—	—	—	—	—	—	—
2001–02	Hartford Wolf Pack	AHL	4	2	1	1	244	11	0	2.71	.905	—	—	—	—	—	—	—	—
2002–03	New York Rangers	NHL	32	8	16	4	1762	93	1	3.17	.890	—	—	—	—	—	—	—	—
2004–05	Victoria Salmon Kings	ECHL	12	3	9	0	695	41	0	3.54	.892	—	—	—	—	—	—	—	—
NHL totals			63	20	32	4	3500	188	1	3.22	.894	—	—	—	—	—	—	—	—

Preceded by Jamie Lundmark	New York Rangers first-round draft pick 2001	Succeeded by Hugh Jessiman
