= Robin Gomez =

Canadian ice hockey player (born 1981)

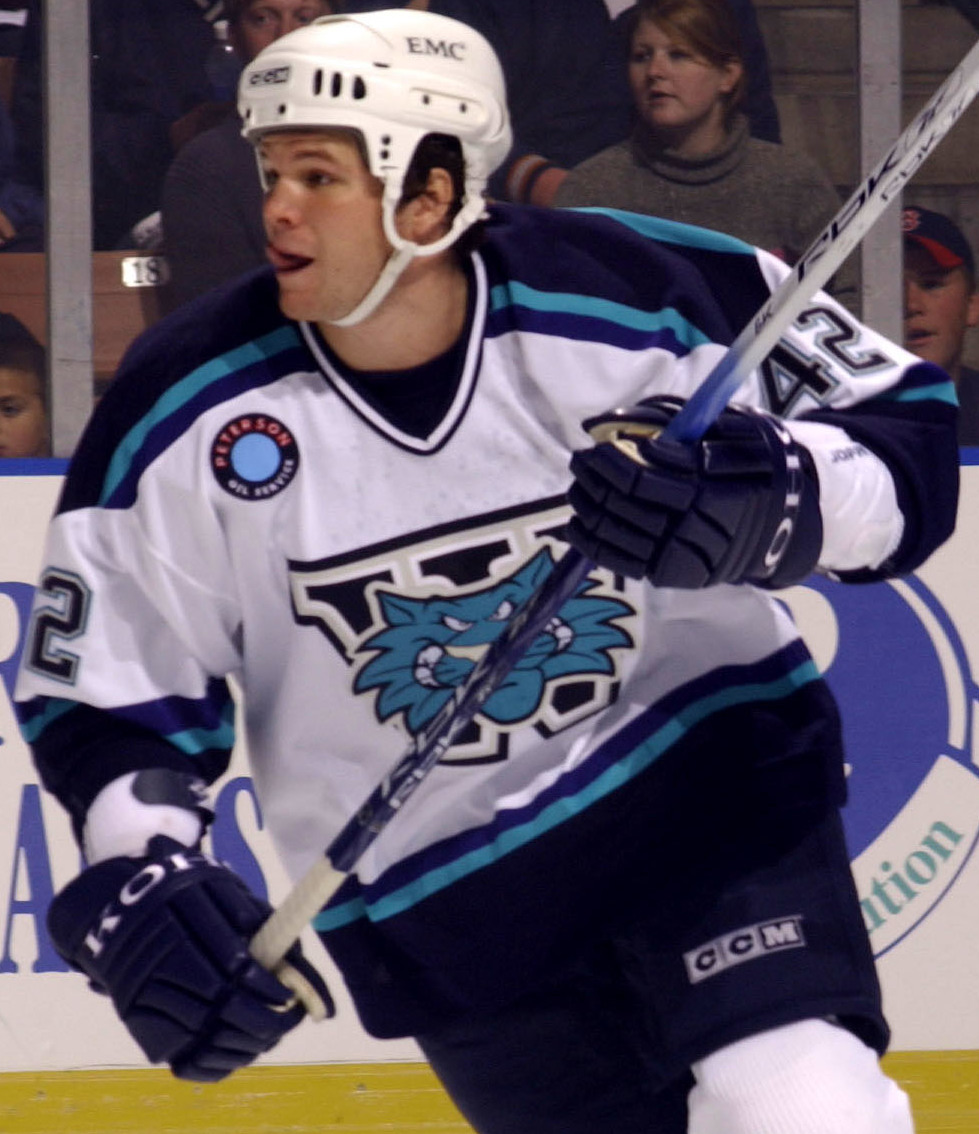
- Gomez with the Worcester Ice Cats during the 2004-05 season
- Born: October 15, 1981 (age 44) Prince Rupert, British Columbia, Canada
- Height: 6 ft 2 in (188 cm)
- Weight: 210 lb (95 kg; 15 st 0 lb)
- Position: Forward
- Shot: Left
- Played for: Worcester Ice Cats; Hershey Bears; South Carolina Stingrays; Victoria Salmon Kings; Manchester Phoenix; Oklahoma City Blazers; Bloomington PrairieThunder
- Playing career: 2002–2010

Robin Gomez (born October 15, 1981 in Prince Rupert, British Columbia) is a Canadian former professional ice hockey player. He most recently played for the Bloomington PrairieThunder of the now defunct International Hockey League.

== Playing career ==
Gomez began his career playing junior level hockey for the Calgary Hitmen in the WHL. Gomez played two full seasons for the Hitmen, clocking up 121 games in the process. He would start the 2001/02 season as a Calgary player but would almost immediately transfer to another WHL team, the Seattle Thunderbirds, where he would manage a ratio of a point every other game through the rest of the season.

Gomez' senior career would begin in the ECHL when he signed for the South Carolina Stingrays. He would prove to be a good signing for the Stingrays, and would provide a more physical approach to the game as well as a solid points production. Gomez stayed with the Stingrays for two full seasons, as well as a number of post-season appearances before moving to the higher AHL level for the beginning of the 2004/05 term, when he would line up as a Worcester Ice Cats player.

Unfortunately for Gomez, he managed just 12 games for the Ice Cats, scoring just one point in that time. Due to his poor points output, he would return to familiar territory with the Stingrays and the ECHL. Gomez would again prove his quality at this level, with his points total rising again, as well as clocking up large numbers of penalty minutes.

Gomez would again try his hand in the AHL in 2004/05, this time with the Hershey Bears. Again it would only be a short spell, this time lasting only three games. Gomez failed to score a single point in the time, but totalled an average of almost 10 penalty minutes a game.

For the 2006/07 season, Gomez would make a drastic change and moved to Europe to sign for EIHL club the Manchester Phoenix and player/coach Tony Hand. Whilst in Manchester he would again play alongside former South Carolina Stingrays team-mate Scott Basiuk.

In his 33-game spell with the Phoenix, Gomez managed 19 points and more than 150 penalty minutes. Despite his impressive performances, Gomez returned to North America and the ECHL mid-season when he became a Victoria Salmon Kings player. Gomez impressed in the 19 regular and 3 post-season games he played in, and was re-signed in the post season to keep him in Victoria for the 2007/08 term.

== Assault charge ==
Gomez was charged with assault for sucker punching Las Vegas Wranglers player Chris Ferraro on March 1, 2008. After getting a concussion from hitting his head on the ice after the assault, Ferraro was unable to play for the next three months, returning in Game 4 of the Kelly Cup Finals. Gomez was also suspended for the remainder of the ECHL season.

== Career statistics ==
			Regular season					Playoffs
Season	Team	League	GP	G	A	Pts	PIM	GP	G	A	Pts	PIM
1999–2000	Calgary Hitmen	WHL	56	5	5	10	170	12	2	1	3	30
2000–01	Calgary Hitmen	WHL	65	5	15	20	253	12	5	0	5	9
2001–02	Calgary Hitmen	WHL	2	0	0	0	11	—	—	—	—	—
2001–02	Seattle Thunderbirds	WHL	64	12	20	32	230	11	1	3	4	19
2002–03	South Carolina Stingrays	ECHL	69	11	16	27	208	4	1	1	2	14
2003–04	South Carolina Stingrays	ECHL	70	12	14	26	214	7	1	1	2	12
2004–05	Worcester IceCats	AHL	12	0	1	1	34	—	—	—	—	—
2004–05	South Carolina Stingrays	ECHL	44	14	8	22	205	1	0	1	1	2
2005–06	South Carolina Stingrays	ECHL	54	12	14	26	191	4	0	0	0	6
2005–06	Hershey Bears	AHL	3	0	0	0	29	—	—	—	—	—
2006–07	Manchester Phoenix	EIHL	29	7	10	17	149	—	—	—	—	—
2006–07	Victoria Salmon Kings	ECHL	19	2	3	5	66	3	0	0	0	5
2007–08	Victoria Salmon Kings	ECHL	38	1	1	2	142	—	—	—	—	—
2008–09	Oklahoma City Blazers	CHL	50	7	13	20	167	4	0	1	1	5
2009–10	Bloomington PrairieThunder	IHL	71	15	16	31	228	—	—	—	—	—
ECHL totals			294	52	56	108	1026	19	2	3	5	39
AHL totals			15	0	1	1	63	—	—	—	—	—
