= Josh Olson (ice hockey) =

American ice hockey player (born 1981)

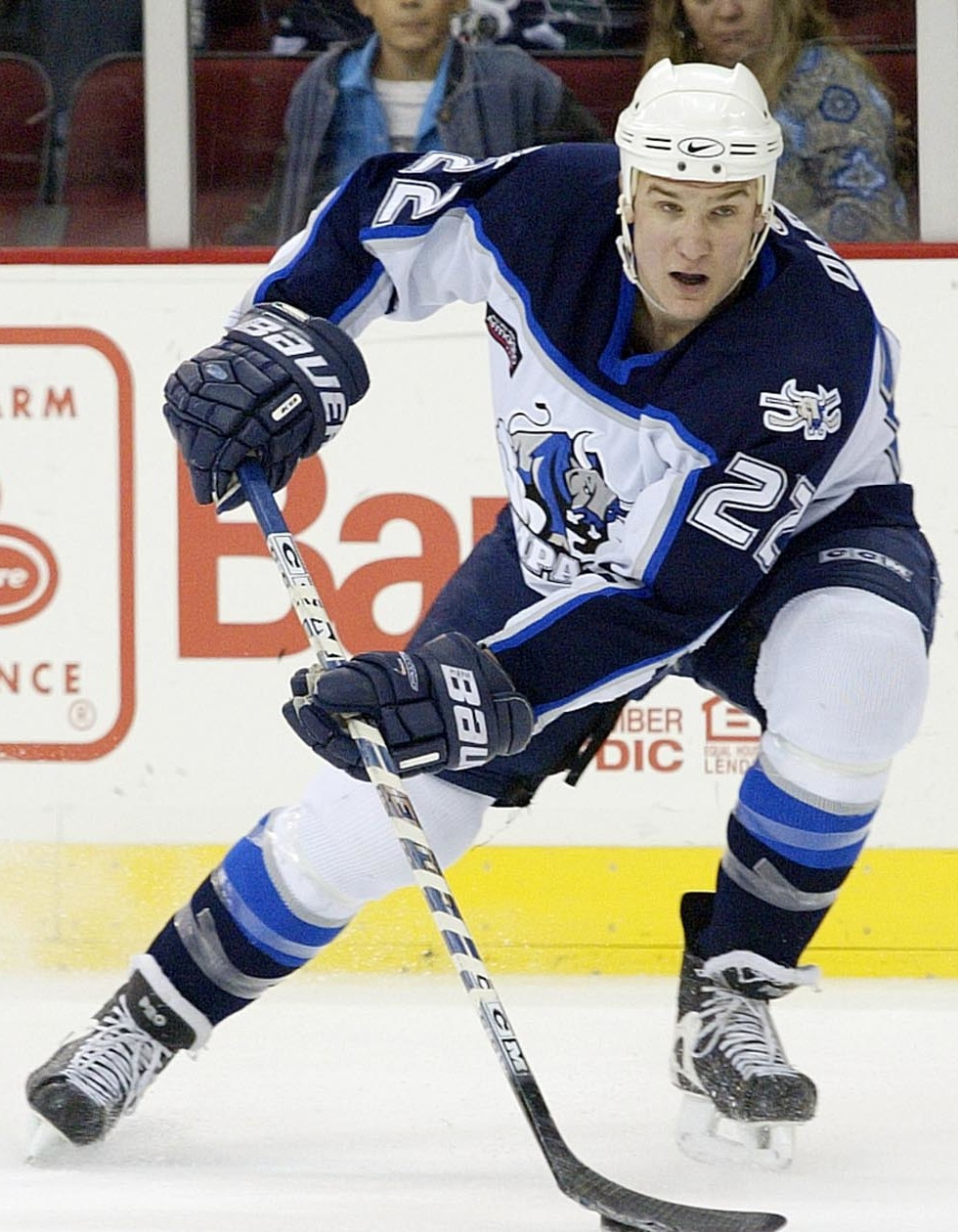
- Olson with the San Antonio Rampage in 2004
- Born: July 13, 1981 (age 44) Fargo, North Dakota, U.S.
- Height: 6 ft 5 in (196 cm)
- Weight: 236 lb (107 kg; 16 st 12 lb)
- Position: Left wing
- Shot: Left
- Played for: Florida Panthers; Ritten/Renon; HC Bolzano; Hannover Indians
- NHL draft: 190th overall, 2000; Florida Panthers
- Playing career: 2002–2010

Josh Olson (born July 13, 1981) is an American former professional ice hockey player who played five National Hockey League (NHL) games with the Florida Panthers during the 2003–04 season. He was drafted by the Panthers in the sixth round, 190th overall, at the 2000 NHL entry draft. Olson moved with his family to Roseau, Minnesota when he was nine years old and he grew up playing hockey for Roseau High School.

== Career statistics ==
			Regular season					Playoffs
Season	Team	League	GP	G	A	Pts	PIM	GP	G	A	Pts	PIM
1998–99	Roseau High School	HSMN
1998–99	Fargo–Moorhead Ice Sharks	USHL	11	2	2	4	8	—	—	—	—	—
1999–2000	Fargo–Moorhead Ice Sharks	USHL	18	2	5	7	37	—	—	—	—	—
1999–2000	Omaha Lancers	USHL	43	6	7	13	44	4	0	0	0	4
2000–01	Portland Winter Hawks	WHL	72	22	38	60	86	16	5	4	9	17
2001–02	Portland Winter Hawks	WHL	72	40	48	88	85	7	4	3	7	8
2001–02	Utah Grizzlies	AHL	1	0	0	0	0	1	0	0	0	0
2002–03	Jackson Bandits	ECHL	39	10	17	27	13	1	0	1	1	0
2002–03	San Antonio Rampage	AHL	23	0	1	1	14	—	—	—	—	—
2003–04	San Antonio Rampage	AHL	73	22	16	38	33	—	—	—	—	—
2003–04	Florida Panthers	NHL	5	1	0	1	0	—	—	—	—	—
2004–05	San Antonio Rampage	AHL	53	9	7	16	17	—	—	—	—	—
2004–05	Hershey Bears	AHL	23	1	2	3	4	—	—	—	—	—
2005–06	Houston Aeros	AHL	75	12	12	24	75	8	2	3	5	6
2006–07	Houston Aeros	AHL	46	7	5	12	35	—	—	—	—	—
2007–08	Ritten Sport	ITA	38	27	30	57	50	—	—	—	—	—
2008–09	HC Bolzano	ITA	47	27	31	58	46	8	2	7	9	10
2009–10	Hannover Indians	GER.2	21	7	10	17	45	—	—	—	—	—
2009–10	HC Bolzano	ITA	8	1	2	3	6	8	1	3	4	39
AHL totals			294	51	43	94	178	9	2	3	5	6
NHL totals			5	1	0	1	0	—	—	—	—	—
