= Brett Lysak =

Canadian ice hockey player (born 1980)

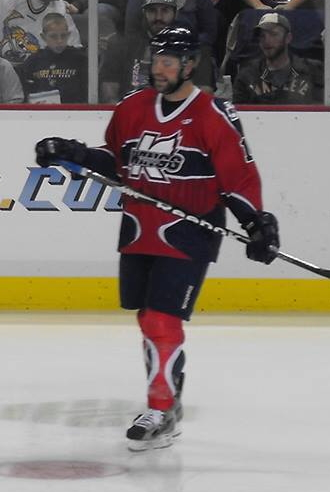
- Lysak in 2013 with the Kalamazoo Wings
- Born: December 30, 1980 (age 45) St. Albert, Alberta, Canada
- Height: 6 ft 0 in (183 cm)
- Weight: 195 lb (88 kg; 13 st 13 lb)
- Position: Centre
- Shot: Left
- Played for: Carolina Hurricanes; Iserlohn Roosters; HC Milano; Odense Bulldogs; EfB Ishockey; HK Jesenice; SønderjyskE Ishockey; Graz 99ers
- NHL draft: 49th overall, 1999; Carolina Hurricanes
- Playing career: 2001–2013

Brett Lysak (born December 30, 1980) is a Canadian former ice hockey player. He played 2 games in the National Hockey League with the Carolina Hurricanes during the 2003–04 season. The rest of his career, which lasted from 2001 to 2013, was spent in various minor leagues and later in Europe.

== Playing career ==
Lysak was drafted 49th overall by the Carolina Hurricanes in the 1999 NHL entry draft, with whom he played two regular season games during the 2002–03 NHL season. He also spent three seasons with the Lowell Lock Monsters of the American Hockey League and had a short spell in the East Coast Hockey League with the Florida Everblades. During the NHL lockout, he played in Germany's Deutsche Eishockey Liga with the Iserlohn Roosters.

He moved to Serie A in 2005 after playing four games for the Manitoba Moose. In 2006–07, he was the team's top scorer with 16 goals and 29 assists for 45 points in just 28 games. In 2009–10, he was the League's top scorer with 23 goals in the Danish ice hockey Premier League AL-Bank Ligaen. He played for Odense Bulldogs for his first season in Danish ice hockey followed by EfB Ishockey and SønderjyskE Ishockey

After competing with the Graz 99ers in the Austrian Hockey League of the 2011–12 season, Lysak returned to North America after seven years signing a one-year deal with the Kalamazoo Wings of the ECHL on September 13, 2012.

== Career statistics ==
=== Regular season and playoffs ===
			Regular season					Playoffs
Season	Team	League	GP	G	A	Pts	PIM	GP	G	A	Pts	PIM
1994–95	St. Albert Sabres	AMBHL	27	32	24	56	18	—	—	—	—	—
1995–96	St. Albert Sabres	AMBHL	18	6	5	11	20	—	—	—	—	—
1995–95	St. Albert Raiders	AMHL	35	20	23	43	68	—	—	—	—	—
1996–97	Regina Pats	WHL	66	11	14	25	41	5	0	1	1	5
1997–98	Regina Pats	WHL	70	22	38	60	82	9	6	2	8	8
1998–99	Regina Pats	WHL	61	39	49	88	84	—	—	—	—	—
1999–00	Regina Pats	WHL	70	38	40	78	24	7	5	4	9	2
2000–01	Regina Pats	WHL	64	35	48	83	44	6	5	1	6	4
2000–01	Regina Pats	M-Cup	—	—	—	—	—	5	3	4	7	4
2001–02	Florida Everblades	ECHL	16	2	7	9	14	6	3	1	4	6
2001–02	Lowell Lock Monsters	AHL	53	6	8	14	26	3	0	0	0	0
2002–03	Lowell Lock Monsters	AHL	46	6	9	15	59	—	—	—	—	—
2003–04	Carolina Hurricanes	NHL	2	0	0	0	2	—	—	—	—	—
2003–04	Lowell Lock Monsters	AHL	71	17	18	35	104	—	—	—	—	—
2004–05	Iserlohn Roosters	DEL	49	9	9	18	151	—	—	—	—	—
2005–06	Manitoba Moose	AHL	4	0	0	0	0	—	—	—	—	—
2005–06	Milano Vipers	ITA	35	13	8	21	36	7	6	3	9	10
2006–07	Milano Vipers	ITA	34	19	28	47	34	6	2	2	4	4
2007–08	Odense Bulldogs	DEN	44	24	29	53	109	10	4	6	10	18
2008–09	EfB Ishockey	DEN	41	24	24	48	135	4	2	0	2	6
2009–10	EfB Ishockey	DEN	36	23	19	42	16	5	1	1	2	2
2010–11	HK Acroni Jesenice	EBEL	39	20	18	38	80	—	—	—	—	—
2010–11	SønderjyskE Ishockey	DEN	3	2	0	2	6	5	1	1	2	6
2011–12	Graz 99ers	EBEL	48	17	29	46	30	—	—	—	—	—
2012–13	Kalamazoo Wings	ECHL	60	19	23	42	28	—	—	—	—	—
AHL totals			174	29	35	64	189	3	0	0	0	0
NHL totals			2	0	0	0	2	—	—	—	—	—

== Awards and achievements ==
- Named to the WHL East Second
- All-Star Team in 1999
- Memorial Cup All Star - Forward in 2001
