= Konstantin Panov =

Russian ice hockey player (born 1980)

- Born: June 29, 1980 (age 46) Chelyabinsk, Russian SFSR, Soviet Union
- Height: 6 ft 0 in (183 cm)
- Weight: 245 lb (111 kg; 17 st 7 lb)
- Position: Right wing
- Shot: Left
- Played for: Traktor Chelyabinsk; Milwaukee Admirals; Toledo Storm; Amur Khabarovsk; Lada Togliatti; Dynamo Moscow; SKA Saint Petersburg; HC Yugra; HSC Csíkszereda
- NHL draft: 131st overall, 1999; Nashville Predators
- Playing career: 1998–2019

Konstantin Sergeyevich Panov (Russian: Константин Сергеевич Панов; born June 29, 1980) is a Russian professional ice hockey right wing who currently plays for HSC Csíkszereda in the Erste Liga. He was drafted in the fifth round, 131st overall in the 1999 NHL entry draft by the Nashville Predators.

He has previously played for Traktor Chelyabinsk, Amur Khabarovsk, HC Lada Togliatti, HC Dynamo Moscow, SKA Saint Petersburg and HC Yugra in the Russian Superleague and the Kontinental Hockey League.

== Career statistics ==
			Regular season					Playoffs
Season	Team	League	GP	G	A	Pts	PIM	GP	G	A	Pts	PIM
1996–97	Yunior Kurgan	Russia3	4	2	0	2	4	—	—	—	—	—
1997–98	Traktor Chelyabinsk	Russia	6	2	0	2	4	2	0	0	0	0
1997–98	Traktor Chelyabinsk	WPHL	6	1	0	1	0	—	—	—	—	—
1997–98	Yunior Kurgan	Russia3	20	7	3	10	10	—	—	—	—	—
1998–99	Kamloops Blazers	WHL	62	33	30	63	62	13	5	3	8	10
1999–00	Kamloops Blazers	WHL	64	43	30	73	47	—	—	—	—	—
2000–01	Kamloops Blazers	WHL	69	44	56	100	54	4	1	0	1	2
2001–02	Milwaukee Admirals	AHL	15	1	5	6	2	—	—	—	—	—
2002–03	Milwaukee Admirals	AHL	67	11	20	31	30	2	0	0	0	0
2002–03	Toledo Storm	ECHL	2	1	0	1	0	—	—	—	—	—
2003–04	Amur Khabarovsk	Russia	29	0	1	1	10	—	—	—	—	—
2003–04	Amur Khabarovsk-2	Russia3	14	8	10	18	8	—	—	—	—	—
2004–05	Traktor Chelyabinsk	Russia2	51	13	22	35	32	8	2	1	3	12
2005–06	Traktor Chelyabinsk	Russia2	40	15	12	27	62	14	8	5	13	37
2006–07	Lada Togliatti	Russia	45	3	7	10	32	3	1	1	2	0
2007–08	Lada Togliatti	Russia	52	11	15	26	26	4	0	1	1	6
2007–08	Lada Togliatti-2	Russia3	1	0	1	1	0	—	—	—	—	—
2008–09	Lada Togliatti	KHL	43	13	8	21	22	5	0	1	1	2
2009–10	Lada Togliatti	KHL	33	12	9	21	22	—	—	—	—	—
2009–10	HC Dynamo Moscow	KHL	12	8	3	11	22	3	0	0	0	0
2010–11	SKA Saint Petersburg	KHL	29	2	7	9	6	7	0	1	1	4
2011–12	Traktor Chelyabinsk	KHL	53	20	15	35	34	10	4	6	10	0
2012–13	Traktor Chelyabinsk	KHL	45	10	15	25	42	10	4	6	10	2
2013–14	Traktor Chelyabinsk	KHL	31	1	5	6	16	—	—	—	—	—
2013–14	Chelmet Chelyabinsk	VHL	7	4	2	6	0	—	—	—	—	—
2014–15	Traktor Chelyabinsk	KHL	59	12	12	24	26	5	0	1	1	4
2015–16	Yugra Khanty-Mansiysk	KHL	57	13	14	27	32	—	—	—	—	—
2016–17	Yugra Khanty-Mansiysk	KHL	50	11	5	16	41	—	—	—	—	—
2017–18	Yugra Khanty-Mansiysk	KHL	43	2	1	3	8	—	—	—	—	—
2018–19	SC Csíkszereda	Erste Liga	43	18	14	32	2	—	—	—	—	—
2018–19	SC Csíkszereda	Romania	22	10	10	20	0	—	—	—	—	—
Russia totals			132	16	23	39	72	9	1	2	3	6
KHL totals			455	104	94	198	255	46	8	15	23	12

== Awards and honours ==
Award	Year
WHL West First Team All-Star	2000–01
