= Tyler MacKay =

Canadian ice hockey player

- Born: January 15, 1980 (age 45); Deschambault Lake, Saskatchewan, Canada
- Height: 5 ft 11 in (180 cm)
- Weight: 165 lb (75 kg; 11 st 11 lb)
- Position: Goaltender
- Caught: Left
- Played for: ECHL; Atlantic City Boardwalk Bullies; Florida Everblades; Wheeling Nailers; UHL; Adirondack IceHawks
- Playing career: 2001–2005

Tyler MacKay (born January 15, 1980) is a Canadian former professional ice hockey goaltender. He last played for the Florida Everblades of the ECHL during the 2004–05 season.

== Awards and honours ==
Award	Year
WHL West First Team All-Star	2000–01

== Career statistics ==
			Regular season									Playoffs
Season	Team	League	GP	W	L	OT	MIN	GA	SO	GAA	SV%	GP	W	L	MIN	GA	SO	GAA	SV%
1997-98	Saskatoon Blades	WHL	42	14	18	4	2202	156	2	4.25	973
1998-99	Saskatoon Blades	WHL	41	8	21	2	2120	134	0	3.79	1135
1999-00	Saskatoon Blades	WHL	5	2	3	0	273	21	0	4.62	119
1999-00	Spokane Chiefs	WHL	37	23	8	2	2083	88	2	2.53	701	8	Statistics unavailable
2000-01	Spokane Chiefs	WHL	62	31	24	6	3567	174	3	2.93	1383	12	Statistics unavailable
2001-02	Wheeling Nailers	ECHL	35	16	12	1	1975	93	1	2.83	1063
2002-03	Wheeling Nailers	ECHL	27	11	12	0	1521	87	2	3.43	817
2002–03	Adirondack IceHawks	UHL	15	5	9	0	778	47	0	3.62	336
2003-04	Wheeling Nailers	ECHL	26	17	5	2	1391	52	4	2.24	606	2	Statistics unavailable
2004-05	Atlantic City Boardwalk Bullies	ECHL	4	0	4	0	193	11	0	3.41	71
2004-05	Florida Everblades	ECHL	23	18	3	2	1407	45	2	1.92	582	17	Statistics unavailable
