= Layne Ulmer =

Canadian professional ice hockey player (born 1980)

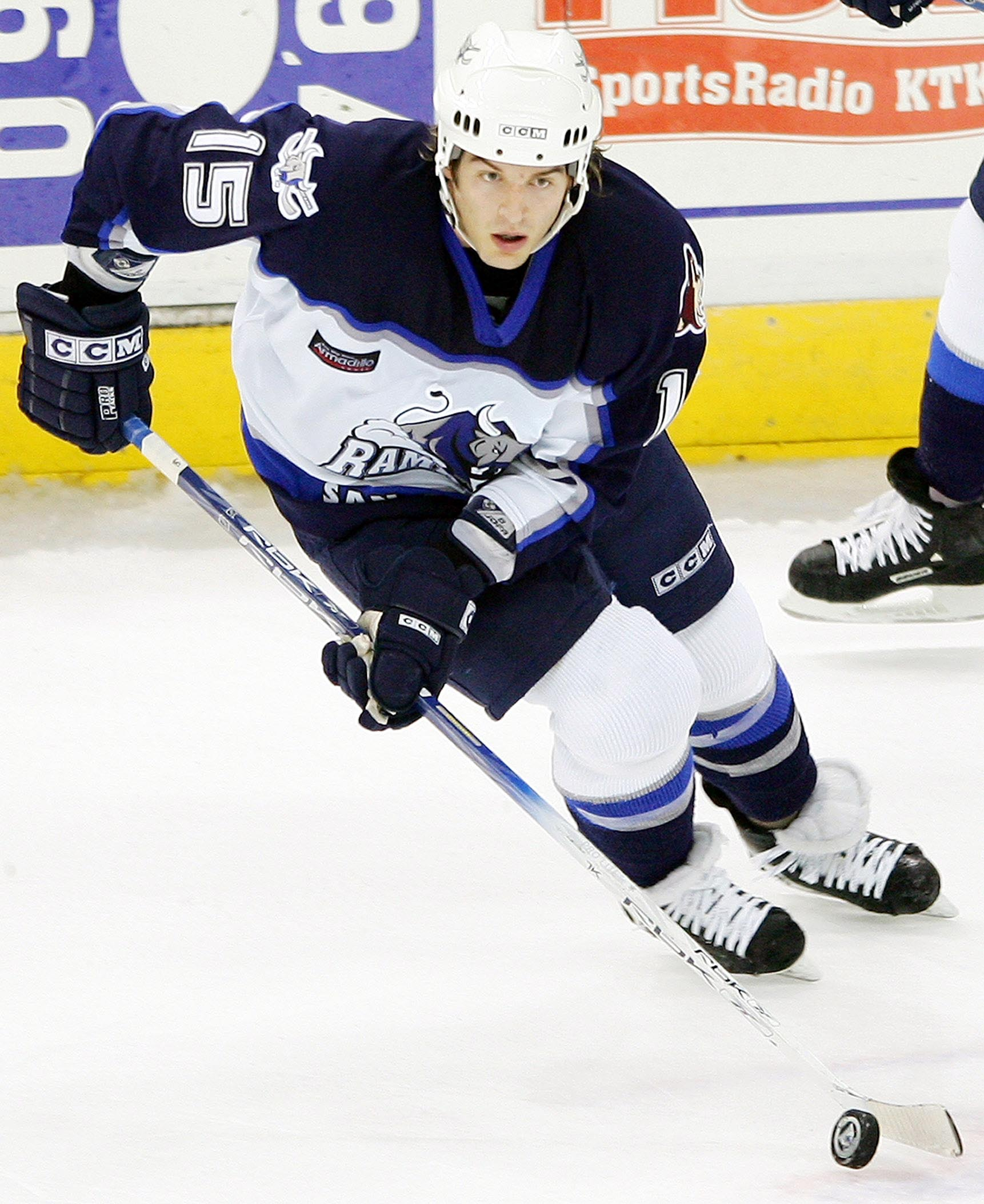
- Ulmer with the San Antonio Rampage in 2005
- Born: September 14, 1980 (age 45) North Battleford, Saskatchewan, Canada
- Height: 6 ft 1 in (185 cm)
- Weight: 197 lb (89 kg; 14 st 1 lb)
- Position: Centre
- Shoots: Left
- Played for: New York Rangers; TPS Turku; Frankfurt Lions; Graz 99ers HC Asiago; Cardiff Devils; Manchester Storm
- NHL draft: 209th overall, 1999; Ottawa Senators
- Playing career: 2001–present

Layne Ulmer (born September 14, 1980) is a Canadian professional ice hockey player who most recently played centre for Manchester Storm in the EIHL.

== Playing career ==
Ulmer was drafted 209th overall in the 1999 NHL entry draft by the Ottawa Senators while playing for the Swift Current Broncos of the Western Hockey League.

On June 13, 2001, Ulmer was signed as a free agent by the New York Rangers and played one game with the Rangers in the National Hockey League in the 2003–04 season. Ulmer spent the majority of his contract with the Rangers affiliate, the Hartford Wolf Pack of the American Hockey League.

Ulmer spent the 2005–06 season with the San Antonio Rampage before leaving for TPS Turku of the SM-liiga. In 2007 Layne played for the DEL's Frankfurt Lions.

In 2016, Ulmer moved to the UK's Elite Ice Hockey League to sign for the Cardiff Devils where he spent the next three seasons - one as Alternate captain - before departing in August 2019.

Ulmer then - on 5 August 2019 - signed a one-year deal with Cardiff's EIHL counterparts Manchester Storm.

== Awards and honours ==
| Award | Year |
|---|---|
| WHL East First Team All-Star | 2000 |
| WHL East First Team All-Star | 2001 |

== Career statistics ==
=== Regular season and playoffs ===
| | | | Regular season | | | | | Playoffs |
| Season | Team | League | GP | G | A | Pts | PIM | GP | G | A | Pts | PIM |
|---|---|---|---|---|---|---|---|---|---|---|---|---|
| 1997–98 | Swift Current Broncos | WHL | 50 | 8 | 9 | 17 | 23 | 12 | 3 | 1 | 4 | 0 |
| 1998–99 | Swift Current Broncos | WHL | 72 | 40 | 35 | 75 | 34 | 6 | 2 | 1 | 3 | 4 |
| 1999–00 | Swift Current Broncos | WHL | 71 | 50 | 54 | 104 | 66 | 12 | 12 | 6 | 18 | 16 |
| 2000–01 | Swift Current Broncos | WHL | 68 | 63 | 56 | 119 | 75 | 19 | 7 | 3 | 10 | 20 |
| 2001–02 | Charlotte Checkers | ECHL | 38 | 18 | 17 | 35 | 12 | 5 | 2 | 2 | 4 | 4 |
| 2001–02 | Hartford Wolf Pack | AHL | 22 | 0 | 5 | 5 | 17 | — | — | — | — | — |
| 2002–03 | Hartford Wolf Pack | AHL | 68 | 12 | 20 | 32 | 16 | 2 | 0 | 0 | 0 | 0 |
| 2003–04 | New York Rangers | NHL | 1 | 0 | 0 | 0 | 0 | — | — | — | — | — |
| 2003–04 | Hartford Wolf Pack | AHL | 76 | 22 | 16 | 38 | 26 | 7 | 2 | 5 | 7 | 0 |
| 2004–05 | Hartford Wolf Pack | AHL | 65 | 7 | 31 | 38 | 23 | 6 | 0 | 0 | 0 | 2 |
| 2005–06 | San Antonio Rampage | AHL | 77 | 19 | 26 | 45 | 42 | — | — | — | — | — |
| 2006–07 | TPS Turku | FIN | 54 | 17 | 29 | 46 | 34 | 2 | 0 | 0 | 0 | 0 |
| 2007–08 | Frankfurt Lions | DEL | 56 | 13 | 14 | 27 | 38 | 12 | 4 | 4 | 8 | 12 |
| 2008–09 | Graz 99ers | EBEL | 49 | 12 | 20 | 32 | 54 | 7 | 2 | 2 | 4 | 0 |
| 2009–10 | Asiago | ITA | 38 | 12 | 16 | 28 | 24 | 16 | 7 | 10 | 17 | 20 |
| 2010–11 | Asiago | ITA | 40 | 23 | 32 | 55 | 10 | 17 | 8 | 12 | 20 | 10 |
| 2011–12 | Asiago | ITA | 45 | 19 | 22 | 41 | 20 | 4 | 1 | 2 | 3 | 4 |
| 2012–13 | Asiago | ITA | 44 | 29 | 29 | 58 | 44 | 15 | 19 | 13 | 32 | 2 |
| 2013–14 | Asiago | ITA | 23 | 17 | 18 | 35 | 6 | 11 | 7 | 5 | 12 | 2 |
| 2014–15 | Asiago | ITA | 36 | 20 | 28 | 48 | 24 | 18 | 10 | 19 | 29 | 12 |
| 2015–16 | Asiago | ITA | 40 | 28 | 32 | 60 | 36 | 11 | 3 | 4 | 7 | 10 |
| 2016–17 | Cardiff Devils | EIHL | 51 | 19 | 33 | 52 | 16 | 4 | 1 | 4 | 5 | 2 |
| 2017–18 | Cardiff Devils | EIHL | 55 | 18 | 35 | 53 | 28 | 4 | 1 | 2 | 3 | 0 |
| 2018–19 | Cardiff Devils | EIHL | 54 | 18 | 23 | 41 | 47 | 4 | 2 | 0 | 2 | 0 |
| 2019–20 | Manchester Storm | EIHL | 49 | 14 | 17 | 31 | 42 | — | — | — | — | — |
| ITA totals | | | 266 | 148 | 177 | 325 | 164 | 92 | 55 | 65 | 120 | 60 |
| NHL totals | | | 1 | 0 | 0 | 0 | 0 | — | — | — | — | — |

== See also ==
- List of players who played only one game in the NHL
