= 2001 Memorial Cup =

Canadian junior men's ice hockey championship

2001 Mastercard Memorial Cup

Tournament details
- Venue(s): Agridome; Regina, Saskatchewan
- Dates: May 19–27, 2001
- Teams: 4
- Host team: Regina Pats (WHL)
- TV partner(s): CTV, CTV Sportsnet

Final positions
- Champions: Red Deer Rebels (WHL) (1st title)
- Runners-up: Val-d'Or Foreurs (QMJHL)

Tournament statistics
- Games played: 9
- Scoring leader: Simon Gamache (Foreurs) (7 points)

Awards
- MVP: Kyle Wanvig (Rebels)

The Memorial Cup trophy

The 2001 Memorial Cup occurred May 19–27 at the Agridome in Regina, Saskatchewan. It was the 83rd annual Memorial Cup competition and determined the major junior ice hockey champion of the Canadian Hockey League (CHL). It featured the host team, the Regina Pats as well as the winners of the Ontario Hockey League, Quebec Major Junior Hockey League and the Western Hockey League which were the Ottawa 67's, Val-d'Or Foreurs and the Red Deer Rebels respectively. The Red Deer Rebels won their first Memorial Cup, beating the Val-d'Or Foreurs in the final.

== Round-robin standings ==
Pos	Team	Pld	W	L	GF	GA
1	Red Deer Rebels (WHL)	3	2	1	11	11
1	Val-d'Or Foreurs (QMJHL)	3	2	1	15	8
3	Regina Pats (host)	3	1	2	9	12
3	Ottawa 67's (OHL)	3	1	2	8	12

== Scores ==
Round Robin

- May 19 Ottawa 5, Regina 2
- May 20 Red Deer 5, Val d'Or 4 (OT)
- May 21 Val d'Or 5, Regina 2
- May 22 Red Deer 4, Ottawa 2
- May 23 Val d'Or 6, Ottawa 1
- May 24 Regina 5, Red Deer 2

Tie-breaker

- May 25: Regina 5, Ottawa 0

Semi-final

- May 26: Val d'Or 5, Regina 4 (OT)

Final

- May 27: Red Deer 6, Val d'Or 5 (OT)

== Winning roster ==
Colby Armstrong, Shane Bendera, Andrew Bergen, Martin Erat, Devin Francon, Boyd Gordon, Diarmuid Kelly, Ross Lupaschuk, Doug Lynch, Justin Mapletoft, Derek Meech, Cam Ondrik, Darcy Robinson, Jeff Smith, Shay Stephenson, Joel Stepp, Bryce Thoma, Jim Vandermeer, Kyle Wanvig, Jeff Woywitka. Coach: Brent Sutter

== Scoring leaders ==
1. Simon Gamache, VDO, (4g 3a) 7p
2. Brett Lysak, REG, (3g 4a) 7p
3. Ross Lupaschuk, RD, (2g 5a) 7p
4. Chris Lyness, VDO, (1g 6a) 7p
5. Stephane Veilleux, VDO, (3g 3a) 6p
6. Brandon Reid, VDO, (3g 3a) 6p
7. Karel Mosovsky, REG, (3g 3a) 6p
8. Kevin Korol, REG, (3g 3a) 6p
9. Kyle Wanvig, RD, (2g 4a) 6p
10. Paul Elliott, REG, (2g 4a) 6p
11. Martin Erat, RD, (1g 5a) 6p
12. Eric Fortier, VDO, (1g 5a) 6p

== Goaltending leaders ==
1. Chad Davidson, REG (2.20 GAA)
2. Maxime Daigneault, VDO (3.22 GAA)
3. Shane Bendera, RD (3.91 GAA)
4. Seamus Kotyk, OTT

== Award winners ==
- Stafford Smythe Memorial Trophy (MVP): Kyle Wanvig, Red Deer
- George Parsons Trophy (Sportsmanship): Brandon Reid, Val-d'Or
- Hap Emms Memorial Trophy (Goaltender): Maxime Daigneault, Val-d'Or
- Ed Chynoweth Trophy (Leading Scorer): Simon Gamache, Val-d'Or

All-star team

- Goaltender – Maxime Daigneault, Val-d'Or
- Defence – Paul Elliott, Regina; Chris Lyness, Val-d'Or & Ross Lupaschuk, Red Deer (tie)
- Forward – Brett Lysak, Regina; Simon Gamache, Val-d'Or; Kyle Wanvig, Red Deer
