= Christian Chartier =

Canadian ice hockey defenceman

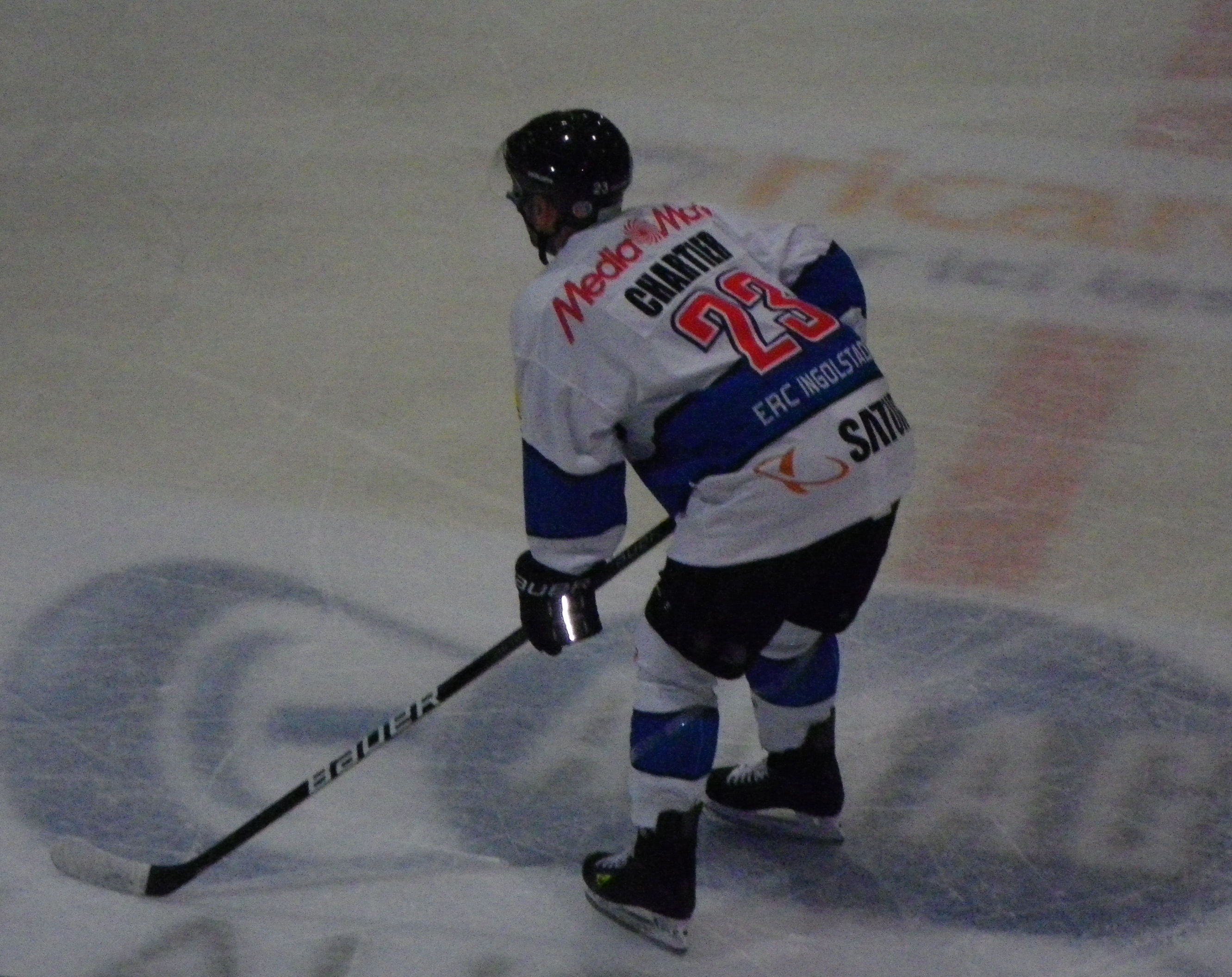
- Born: December 29, 1980 (age 44); St. Lazare, Manitoba, Canada
- Height: 6 ft 0 in (183 cm)
- Weight: 216 lb (98 kg; 15 st 6 lb)
- Position: Defence
- Shoots: Left
- DEL team Former teams: Augsburger Panther; St. John's Maple Leafs; Manitoba Moose; Iowa Stars; ERC Ingolstadt
- NHL draft: 199th overall, 1999; Edmonton Oilers
- Playing career: 2001–present

Christian Chartier (born December 29, 1980) is a Canadian ice hockey defenceman who last played for Augsburger Panther in the Deutsche Eishockey Liga (DEL).

== Playing career ==
=== Junior ===
Chartier played junior hockey in the Western Hockey League (WHL) for the Saskatoon Blades and Prince George Cougars. Chartier was drafted 199th overall in the 1999 National Hockey League (NHL) Entry Draft by the Edmonton Oilers. During his final season in the WHL (2000-01), Chartier was awarded the Bill Hunter Trophy as the WHL's Top Defenceman. While playing in Prince George, Chartier spent much of his time paired with Dan Hamhuis of the Vancouver Canucks. After the 2000-01 season, Chartier and Hamhuis were both named to the WHL's First All-Star Team.

=== Professional ===
He spent three seasons with the St. John's Maple Leafs in the American Hockey League between 2001 and 2004. He then spent two seasons in the ECHL with the Las Vegas Wranglers with short spell in the AHL for the Manitoba Moose and the Iowa Stars in between.

In 2006, he moved to the GET-ligaen in Norway to play for Vålerenga Ishockey. He moved to play with the Augsburger Panther of the DEL starting in 2007. Chartier productively spent the next three seasons on the Panthers blueline. After scoring 33 points in the 2009-10 season, he left to sign a one-year contract with ERC Ingolstadt on May 3, 2010. However in his first season with Ingolstadt, Chartier struggled to recapture his offensive presence and recorded only 13 points in 52 games.

In an attempt to regain form Chartier returned to Augsburger on a one-year deal on April 1, 2011.

== Awards and honours ==
Award	Year
WHL West First Team All-Star	2000–01

== Career statistics ==
			Regular season					Playoffs
Season	Team	League	GP	G	A	Pts	PIM	GP	G	A	Pts	PIM
1996–97	Saskatoon Blades	WHL	64	2	23	25	32	—	—	—	—	—
1997–98	Saskatoon Blades	WHL	68	8	33	41	43	6	0	3	3	12
1998–99	Saskatoon Blades	WHL	62	2	14	16	71	—	—	—	—	—
1999–2000	Saskatoon Blades	WHL	11	2	2	4	4	—	—	—	—	—
1999–2000	Prince George Cougars	WHL	57	16	36	52	60	13	4	9	13	12
2000–01	Prince George Cougars	WHL	63	12	56	68	99	6	1	4	5	6
2001–02	St. John's Maple Leafs	AHL	65	5	10	15	18	11	0	4	4	4
2002–03	St. John's Maple Leafs	AHL	67	4	22	26	48	—	—	—	—	—
2003–04	St. John's Maple Leafs	AHL	62	3	14	17	34	—	—	—	—	—
2004–05	Las Vegas Wranglers	ECHL	65	9	20	29	35	—	—	—	—	—
2005–06	Las Vegas Wranglers	ECHL	62	6	35	41	26	7	1	4	5	4
2005–06	Manitoba Moose	AHL	1	0	0	0	2	—	—	—	—	—
2005–06	Iowa Stars	AHL	2	0	0	0	0	—	—	—	—	—
2006–07	Vålerenga	NOR	44	9	16	25	92	—	—	—	—	—
2007–08	Augsburger Panther	DEL	53	3	21	24	56	—	—	—	—	—
2008–09	Augsburger Panther	DEL	39	8	15	23	30	4	0	1	1	0
2009–10	Augsburger Panther	DEL	56	7	26	33	60	14	3	3	6	12
2010–11	ERC Ingolstadt	DEL	52	3	10	13	44	4	0	1	1	2
2011–12	Augsburger Panther	DEL	52	5	15	20	40	2	0	1	1	0
AHL totals			197	12	46	58	102	11	0	4	4	4
DEL totals			252	26	87	113	230	24	3	6	9	14

== Awards and honours ==
Award	Year
WHL
Second Team All-Star	1999–2000
First Team All-Star	2000–01
Bill Hunter Trophy	2000–01
