= Billy Thompson (ice hockey) =

Canadian ice hockey player

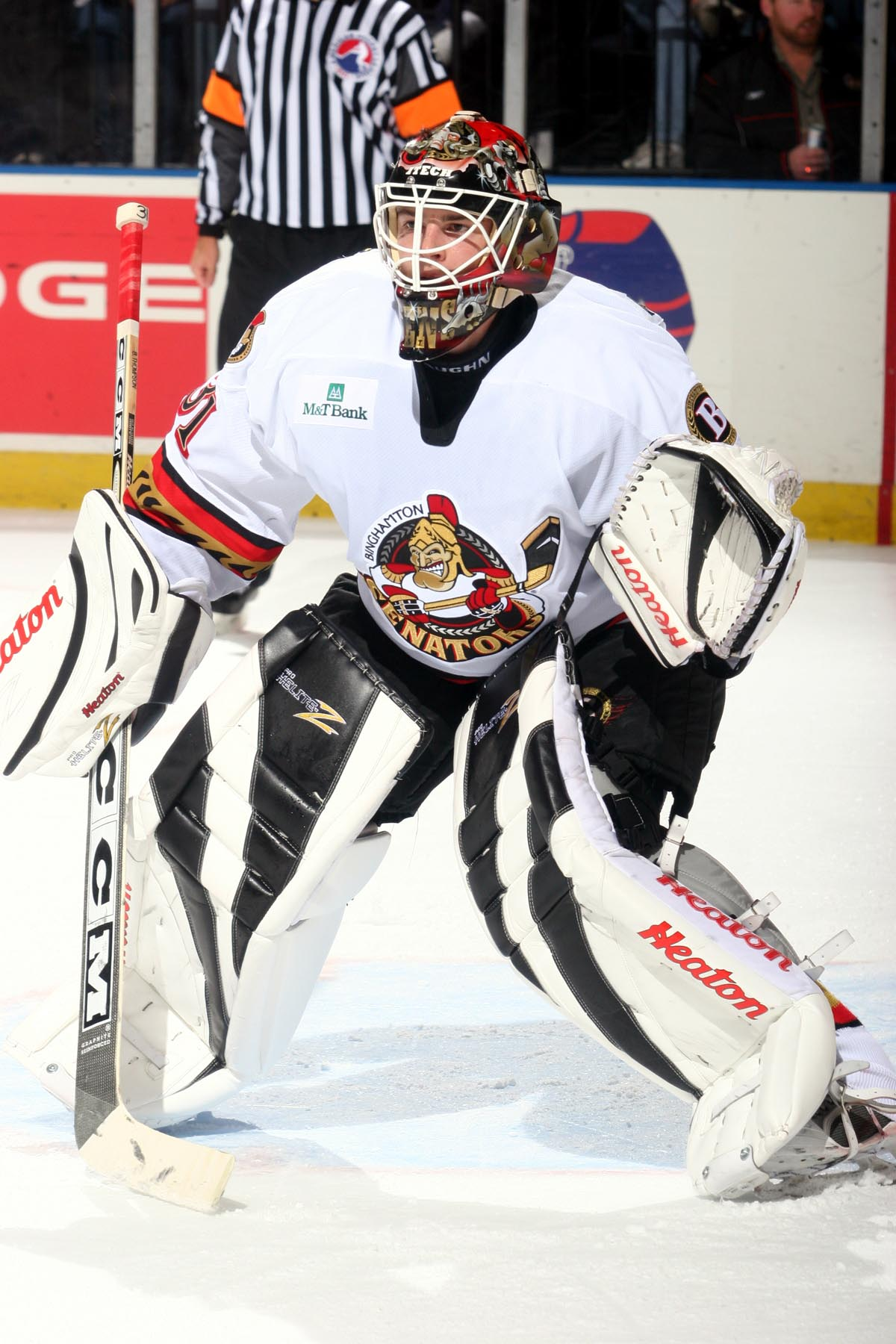
- Thompson with the Binghamton Senators in 2005
- Born: September 24, 1982 (age 43) Saskatoon, Saskatchewan, Canada
- Height: 6 ft 2 in (188 cm)
- Weight: 200 lb (91 kg; 14 st 4 lb)
- Position: Goaltender
- Caught: Left
- Played for: Prince George Cougars; Binghamton Senators; Bridgeport Sound Tigers; Victoria Salmon Kings; Destil Trappers; Cortina; Gothiques d'Amiens
- NHL draft: 136th overall, 2001; Florida Panthers
- Playing career: 2003–2012

Billy Thompson (born September 24, 1982) is a Canadian former professional ice hockey goaltender.

== Career ==
Thompson made his junior hockey debut in the 1998–99 season with the Prince George Cougars of the WHL, although he only played part of one game. He started one more game the following season. For three seasons between 2000 and 2003, he played 149 games with the Cougars, compiling a win-loss record of 64 wins and 69 losses.

He was drafted in the 5th round (136th overall) of the 2001 NHL entry draft by the Florida Panthers. On October 1, 2002, the Panthers traded him to the Ottawa Senators along with Greg Watson for goaltender Jani Hurme. He made his professional hockey debut that season with the AHL's Binghamton Senators, winning the sole game he played.

Thompson served as the backup to Ray Emery for the next two seasons at Binghamton. He played 34 games each year with a total record of 32 and 22 in that span. Thompson was called up to Ottawa for the first time in his career on February 27, 2006, to serve as the backup when starting goalie Dominik Hašek was injured, though he ultimately did not see any game action.

He would spend the 2006-07 season with the AHL's Bridgeport Sound Tigers before moving on to the Victoria Salmon Kings of the ECHL in 2007-08. In September, 2008, he signed with the Dutch Eredevisie Destil Trappers, and left the club on April 24, 2009. Thompson last played with Les Gothiques d'Amiens in Ligue Magnus (first division of France), in 2012.

After his hockey career Thompson moved to Kelowna, British Columbia and became a Chartered Accountant, receiving an honour roll standing on his final exam.

== Awards and honours ==
Award	Year
WHL
West Second All-Star Team	2003
