= Kyle Wanvig =

Canadian ice hockey player

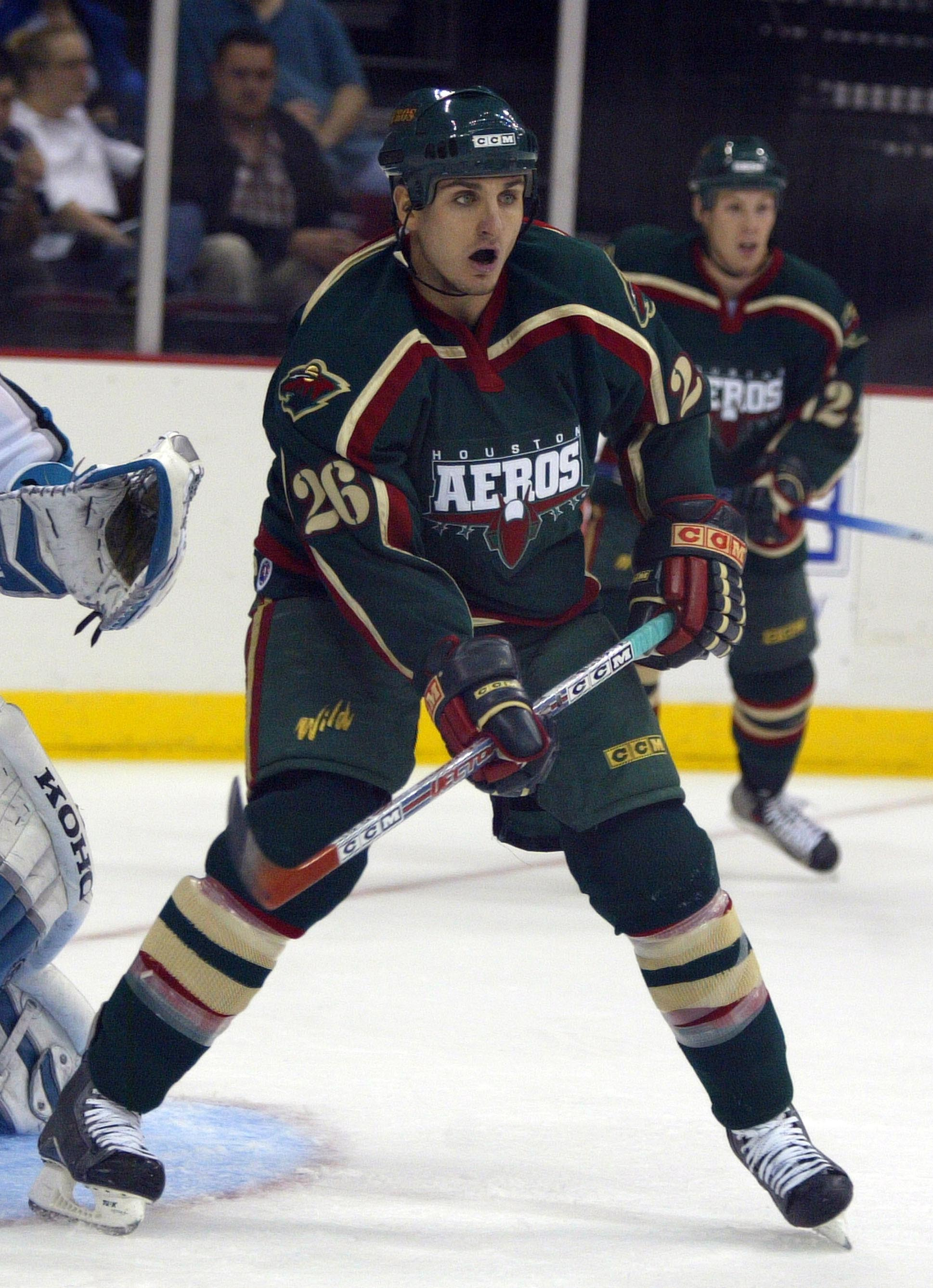
- Wanvig with the Houston Aeros in 2004
- Born: January 29, 1981 (age 45) Calgary, Alberta, Canada
- Height: 6 ft 3 in (191 cm)
- Weight: 230 lb (104 kg; 16 st 6 lb)
- Position: Right wing
- Shot: Right
- Played for: Minnesota Wild; Tampa Bay Lightning; Amur Khabarovsk; Brynäs IF; Augsburger Panther; HK SKP Poprad; EC VSV
- NHL draft: 89th overall, 1999; Boston Bruins; 36th overall, 2001; Minnesota Wild
- Playing career: 2001–2011

Kyle Wanvig (born January 29, 1981) is a Canadian former professional ice hockey winger who played in the National Hockey League with the Minnesota Wild and the Tampa Bay Lightning.

== Playing career ==
Wanvig was originally drafted 89th overall by the Boston Bruins in the 1999 NHL entry draft, but he re-entered the draft and was selected 36th overall by the Minnesota Wild in the 2001 NHL entry draft. While with the Wild affiliate, the Houston Aeros of the American Hockey League, in 2002-2003, Kyle Wanvig scored three game winning goals in the first series of the playoffs, against the Milwaukee Admirals, which led to a Calder Cup Championship.

In July 2006, he was signed by the Atlanta Thrashers. In February 2007, he was traded to the Tampa Bay Lightning along with Stephen Baby for Andy Delmore and Andre Deveaux.

He came to the Swedish Elitserien to play for Brynäs IF in November 2008. However, in January 2009 Wanvig's contract with Brynäs IF was terminated with immediate effect.

In 2009, Wanvig returned to North America, joining the Portland Pirates of the AHL.

In July 2010 he signed a contract with the Augsburger Panther, 2010 finalists of the highest German league, the DEL.

During the 2011–12 season, while contracted to EC VSV, Wanvig announced his retirement after 16 games when he suffered an injury on December 11, 2011.

== Career statistics ==
=== Regular season and playoffs ===
			Regular season					Playoffs
Season	Team	League	GP	G	A	Pts	PIM	GP	G	A	Pts	PIM
1997–98	Edmonton Ice	WHL	62	17	12	29	69	—	—	—	—	—
1998–99	Kootenay Ice	WHL	71	12	20	32	119	7	1	3	4	18
1999–2000	Kootenay Ice	WHL	6	2	2	4	12	—	—	—	—	—
1999–2000	Red Deer Rebels	WHL	58	21	18	39	123	4	1	0	1	4
2000–01	Red Deer Rebels	WHL	69	55	46	101	202	22	10	12	22	47
2001–02	Houston Aeros	AHL	34	6	7	13	43	9	0	1	1	23
2002–03	Houston Aeros	AHL	57	13	16	29	137	21	6	4	10	27
2002–03	Minnesota Wild	NHL	7	0	1	1	13	—	—	—	—	—
2003–04	Houston Aeros	AHL	72	25	16	41	147	2	0	1	1	0
2003–04	Minnesota Wild	NHL	6	0	1	1	10	—	—	—	—	—
2004–05	Houston Aeros	AHL	76	13	17	30	158	5	1	2	3	8
2005–06	Minnesota Wild	NHL	51	4	8	12	64	—	—	—	—	—
2006–07	Chicago Wolves	AHL	26	10	11	21	61	—	—	—	—	—
2006–07	Springfield Falcons	AHL	23	11	7	18	40	—	—	—	—	—
2006–07	Tampa Bay Lightning	NHL	4	0	0	0	0	—	—	—	—	—
2007–08	Norfolk Admirals	AHL	62	23	33	56	110	—	—	—	—	—
2007–08	Tampa Bay Lightning	NHL	7	1	0	1	7	—	—	—	—	—
2008–09	Amur Khabarovsk	KHL	16	2	1	3	28	—	—	—	—	—
2008–09	Brynäs IF	SEL	18	2	1	3	53	—	—	—	—	—
2009–10	Portland Pirates	AHL	63	13	25	38	132	3	0	1	1	2
2010–11	HK Poprad	SVK	5	2	2	4	33	17	3	4	7	118
2010–11	Augsburger Panther	DEL	37	5	10	15	102	—	—	—	—	—
2011–12	EC VSV	AUT	16	1	2	3	63	—	—	—	—	—
AHL totals			413	114	132	246	828	40	7	9	16	60
NHL totals			75	6	9	15	94	—	—	—	—	—

=== International ===
Year	Team	Event	Results	GP	G	A	Pts	PIM
1998	Canada	U18	1st place, gold medalist(s)	3	0	1	1	4
Junior totals				3	0	1	1	4

== Awards and honors ==
Award	Year
WHL
East Second Team All-Star	2001
