= Blake Evans =

Canadian ice hockey player (born 1980)

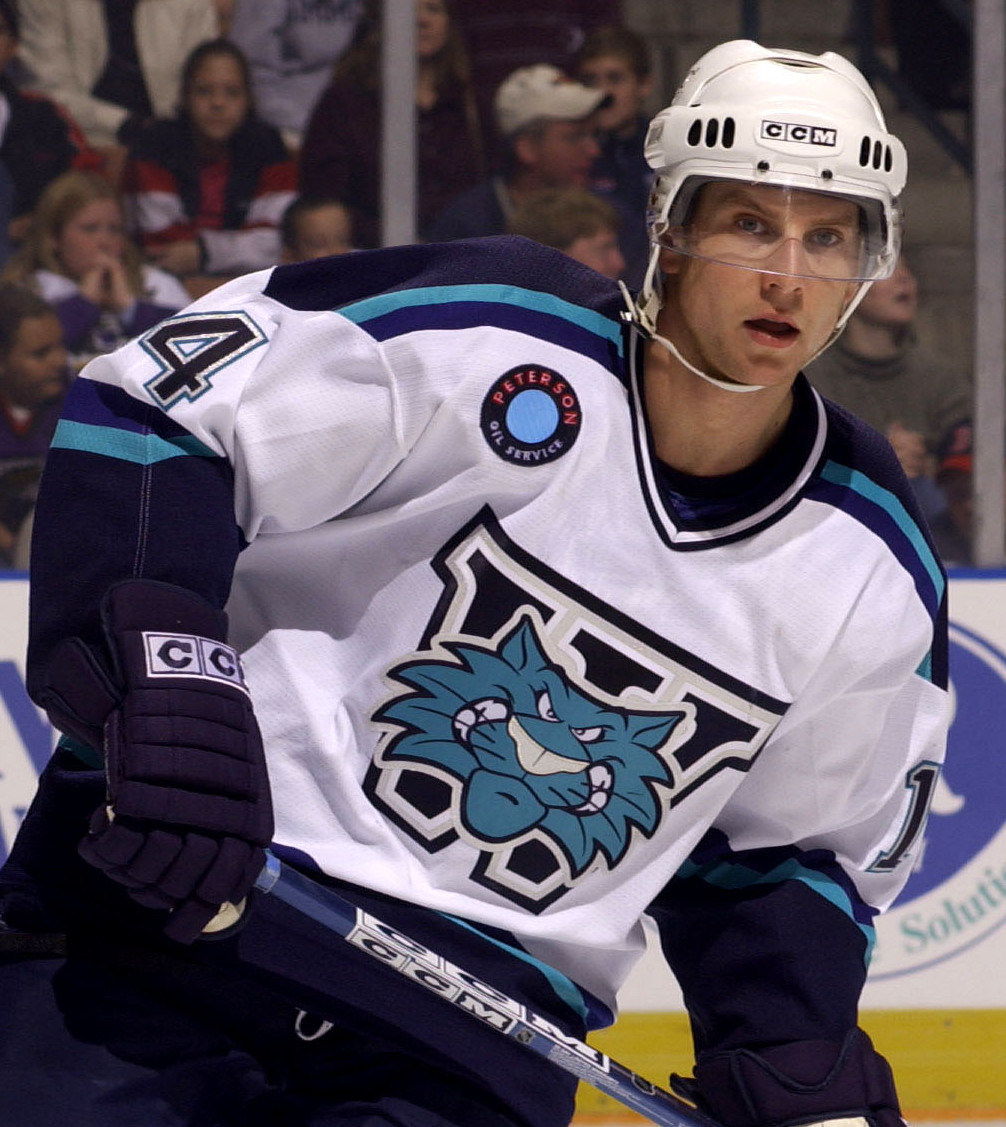
- Evans with the Worcester IceCats during the 2004-05 season
- Born: July 2, 1980 (age 46) Kindersley, Saskatchewan, Canada
- Height: 6 ft 0 in (183 cm)
- Weight: 202 lb (92 kg; 14 st 6 lb)
- Position: Centre
- Shot: Left
- Played for: Peoria Rivermen (ECHL); Worcester IceCats (AHL); Peoria Rivermen (AHL); Milano Vipers (Serie A); Vålerenga (GET); Sparta Warriors (GET)
- NHL draft: 251st overall, 1998; Washington Capitals
- Playing career: 1996–2014

Blake Evans (born July 2, 1980) is a Canadian former professional ice hockey centre, who last played for Kyle Elks in the SVHL.

== Draft ==
Born in Kindersley, Saskatchewan, Evans was drafted 251st overall by the Washington Capitals in the 1998 NHL entry draft but never played in the National Hockey League.

== Career ==
=== Early career ===
He started his career with the WHL team Spokane Chiefs in 1996. After one and a half season, he was traded to the Tri-City Americans (also in the WHL) along with Regan Darby for Zenith Komarniski on 6 October 1997.

On 8 January 2001, he got traded to Regina Pats (WHL) along with Jeff Feniak for Shawn Belle, Joey Bastien, Justin Lucyshyn and future considerations. He made the WHL East Second All-Star Team the same year. A few months after he was re-signed as a free agent by the St. Louis Blues on 11 April 2001, and assigned to the Worcester IceCats and later the Peoria Rivermen.

=== Moving abroad ===
On 30 August 2006, he was signed as a free agent by the Milano Vipers of the Italian Serie A.

On 20 May 2008, he joined former team mate Regan Kelly in the Norwegian club Vålerenga.

== Awards and honors ==
Award	Year
WHL
East Second Team All-Star	2001
