= CHL All-Star team =

Annual junior ice hockey honour

CHL All-Star Team
- Sport: Ice hockey
- League: Canadian Hockey League
- Awarded for: Best players at each position as voted by the NHL Central Scouting Bureau

The Canadian Hockey League All-Star teams are named annually to honour the best performers over the season at each position, drawn from across the CHL's three component major junior leagues (the Quebec Maritimes Junior Hockey League, the Ontario Hockey League, and the Western Hockey League). The practice of naming all-star teams was most recently revived by the CHL for the 2022–23 season, having previously ceased the practice after the 2009–10 season, and not having named a Third All-Star Team since the 2002–03 season.

Voting on the composition of the teams is done annually by the membership of the NHL Central Scouting Bureau, "based on regular-season play along with all-star selections and award winners" from the three leagues.

== Selections ==
**Player** **(in bold text)**	Denotes players who won the CHL Player of the Year award in the same year
Player (in italic text)	Denotes players who won the CHL Defenceman of the Year award in the same year
^	Denotes players who won the CHL Goaltender of the Year award in the same year
*	Denotes players who won the CHL Rookie of the Year award in the same year
†	Denotes players who won the CHL Top Scorer Award in the same year

Season	Position	First Team	Second Team	Third Team	All-Rookie Team	Ref
2022–23	Forwards	**Connor Bedard**† (Regina Pats)	Zachary Bolduc (Quebec Remparts)	Zach Benson (Winnipeg Ice)	Maxim Massé* (Chicoutimi Saguenéens)	
2022–23	Forwards	Jordan Dumais (Halifax Mooseheads)	Josh Lawrence (Halifax Mooseheads)	Alexandre Doucet (Halifax Moosehead)	Michael Misa (Saginaw Spirit)	
2022–23	Forwards	Logan Stankoven (Kamloops Blazers)	Matthew Maggio (Windsor Spitfires)	Riley Kidney (Gatineau Olympiques)	Alexander Suzdalev (Regina Pats)	
2022–23	Defencemen	Brandt Clarke (Barrie Colts)	Tristan Luneau (Gatineau Olympiques)	Kevin Korchinski (Seattle Thunderbirds)	Oliver Bonk (London Knights)	
2022–23	Defencemen	Olen Zellweger (Kamloops Blazers)	Pavel Mintyukov (Ottawa 67's)	Stanislav Svozil (Regina Pats)	Zayne Parekh (Saginaw Spirit)	
2022–23	Goaltender	Thomas Milic (Seattle Thunderbirds)	Dom DiVincentiis (North Bay Battalion)	Nathan Darveau^ (Victoriaville Tigres)	Austin Elliott (Saskatoon Blades)	
2023–24	Forwards	**Jagger Firkus**† (Moose Jaw Warriors)	Anthony Romani (North Bay Battalion)	Gavin McKenna (Medicine Hat Tigers)	Gavin McKenna* (Medicine Hat Tigers)	
2023–24	Forwards	Easton Cowan (London Knights)	Berkly Catton (Spokane Chiefs)	Carson Rehkopf (Kitchener Rangers)	Terik Parascak (Prince George Cougars)	
2023–24	Forwards	Zac Funk (Prince George Cougars)	David Goyette (Sudbury Wolves)	Mathieu Cataford (Halifax Mooseheads)	Jake O'Brien (Brantford Bulldogs)	
2023–24	Defencemen	Denton Mateychuk (Moose Jaw Warriors)	Hunter Brzustewicz (Kitchener Rangers)	Vsevolod Komarov (Drummondville Voltigeurs)	Tarin Smith (Everett Silvertips)	
2023–24	Defencemen	Zayne Parekh (Saginaw Spirit)	Carter Yakemchuk (Calgary Hitmen)	Luca Cagnoni (Portland Winterhawks)	Xavier Villeneuve (Blainville-Boisbriand Armada)	
2023–24	Goaltender	William Rousseau^ (Rouyn-Noranda Huskies)	Jacob Oster (Oshawa Generals)	Harrison Meneghin (Lethbridge Hurricanes)	Carter George (Owen Sound Attack)	
2024–25	Forwards	Andrew Cristall (Spokane Chiefs)	Berkly Catton (Spokane Chiefs)	Easton Cowan (London Knights)	Lars Steiner (Rouyn-Noranda Huskies)	
2024–25	Forwards	**Gavin McKenna** (Medicine Hat Tigers)	Nick Lardis (Brantford Bulldogs)	Jonathan Fauchon (Rimouski Océanic)	Matvei Gridin (Shawinigan Cataractes)	
2024–25	Forwards	Michael Misa† (Saginaw Spirit)	Ilya Protas (Windsor Spitfires)	Liam Greentree (Windsor Spitfires)	Pierce Mbuyi (Owen Sound Attack)	
2024–25	Defencemen	Sam Dickinson (London Knights)	Tyson Jugnauth (Portland Winterhawks)	Landon DuPont (Everett Silvertips)	Landon DuPont* (Everett Silvertips)	
2024–25	Defencemen	Zayne Parekh (Saginaw Spirit)	Luca Marrelli (Oshawa Generals)	Xavier Villeneuve (Blainville-Boisbriand Armada)	Ryan Lin (Vancouver Giants)	
2024–25	Goaltender	Jackson Parsons^ (Kitchener Rangers)	Austin Elliott (London Knights)	Max Hildebrand (Prince Albert Raiders)	Lucas Beckman (Baie-Comeau Drakkar)	
