= Bill Hunter Memorial Trophy =

The Bill Hunter Memorial Trophy is awarded annually to the defenceman of the year in the Western Hockey League (WHL). It is named after one of the league's founders, Bill Hunter, who was the driving force behind the creation of the WHL. Hunter served as the owner, general manager and head coach of the Edmonton Oil Kings, and was the first Chairman of the Board of the new league.

== List of winners ==
denotes also named CHL Defenceman of the Year

WHL Defenceman of the Year
Season	Player	Team
1966–67	Barry Gibbs	Estevan Bruins
1967–68	Gerry Hart	Flin Flon Bombers
1968–69	Dale Hoganson	Estevan Bruins
1969–70	Jim Hargreaves	Winnipeg Jets
1970–71	Ron Jones	Edmonton Oil Kings
1971–72	Jim Watson	Calgary Centennials
1972–73	George Pesut	Saskatoon Blades
1973–74	Pat Price	Saskatoon Blades
1974–75	Rick Lapointe	Victoria Cougars
1975–76	Kevin McCarthy	Winnipeg Clubs
1976–77	Barry Beck	New Westminster Bruins
1977–78	Brad McCrimmon	Brandon Wheat Kings
1978–79	Keith Brown	Portland Winter Hawks
1979–80	Dave Babych	Portland Winter Hawks
1980–81	Jim Benning	Portland Winter Hawks
1981–82	Gary Nylund	Portland Winter Hawks
1982–83	Gary Leeman	Regina Pats
1983–84	Bob Rouse	Lethbridge Broncos
1984–85	Wendel Clark	Saskatoon Blades
1985–86 (Note: In 85–86 and 86–87, the WHL handed out separate awards for the East and West divisions)	(West) Glen Wesley	Portland Winter Hawks
1985–86	(East) Emanuel Viveiros	Prince Albert Raiders
1986–87	(West) Glen Wesley	Portland Winter Hawks
1986–87	(East) Wayne McBean	Medicine Hat Tigers
1987–88	Greg Hawgood	Kamloops Blazers
1988–89	Dan Lambert	Swift Current Broncos
1989–90	Kevin Haller	Regina Pats
1990–91	Darryl Sydor	Kamloops Blazers
1991–92	Richard Matvichuk	Saskatoon Blades
1992–93	Jason Smith	Regina Pats
1993–94	Brendan Witt	Seattle Thunderbirds
1994–95	Nolan Baumgartner	Kamloops Blazers
1995–96	Nolan Baumgartner	Kamloops Blazers
1996–97	Chris Phillips	Lethbridge Hurricanes
1997–98	Michal Rozsival	Swift Current Broncos
1998–99	Brad Stuart	Calgary Hitmen
1999–2000	Micki Dupont	Kamloops Blazers
2000–01	Christian Chartier	Prince George Cougars
2001–02	Dan Hamhuis	Prince George Cougars
2002–03	Jeff Woywitka	Red Deer Rebels
2003–04	Dion Phaneuf	Red Deer Rebels
2004–05	Dion Phaneuf	Red Deer Rebels
2005–06	Kris Russell	Medicine Hat Tigers
2006–07	Kris Russell	Medicine Hat Tigers
2007–08	Karl Alzner	Calgary Hitmen
2008–09	Jonathon Blum	Vancouver Giants
2009–10	Tyson Barrie	Kelowna Rockets
2010–11	Stefan Elliott	Saskatoon Blades
2011–12	Alex Petrovic	Red Deer Rebels
2012–13	Brenden Kichton	Spokane Chiefs
2013–14	Derrick Pouliot	Portland Winterhawks
2014–15	Shea Theodore	Seattle Thunderbirds
2015–16	Ivan Provorov	Brandon Wheat Kings
2016–17	Ethan Bear	Seattle Thunderbirds
2017–18	Kale Clague	Brandon/Moose Jaw
2018–19	Ty Smith	Spokane Chiefs
2019–20	Ty Smith	Spokane Chiefs
2020–21	Braden Schneider	Brandon Wheat Kings
2021–22	Olen Zellweger	Everett Silvertips
2022–23	Olen Zellweger	Kamloops Blazers
2023–24	Denton Mateychuk	Moose Jaw Warriors
2024–25	Tyson Jugnauth	Portland Winterhawks
2025–26	Bryce Pickford	Medicine Hat Tigers

== See also ==
- CHL Defenceman of the Year – First awarded in 1987–88
- Max Kaminsky Trophy – Ontario Hockey League Defenceman of the Year
- Emile Bouchard Trophy – Quebec Major Junior Hockey League Defenceman of the Year
