= Tony DeAngelo =

American ice hockey player (born 1995)

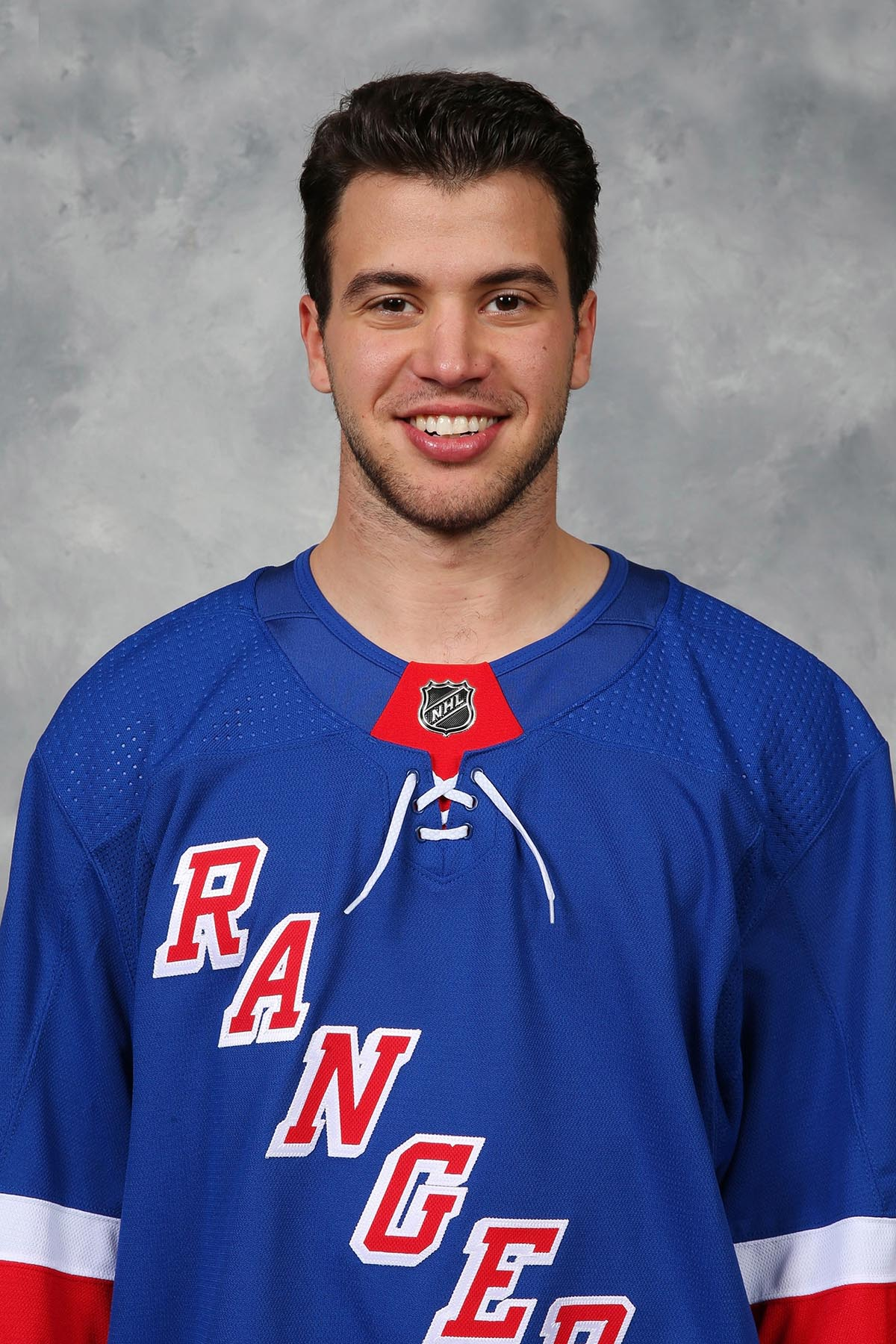
- DeAngelo with the New York Rangers in 2017
- Born: October 24, 1995 (age 31) Sewell, New Jersey, U.S.
- Height: 5 ft 11 in (180 cm)
- Weight: 190 lb (86 kg; 13 st 8 lb)
- Position: Defense
- Shoots: Right
- NHL team Former teams: New York Islanders; Arizona Coyotes; New York Rangers; Carolina Hurricanes; Philadelphia Flyers; SKA Saint Petersburg
- NHL draft: 19th overall, 2014; Tampa Bay Lightning
- Playing career: 2015–present

Anthony DeAngelo (born October 24, 1995) is an American professional ice hockey player who is a defenseman for the New York Islanders of the National Hockey League (NHL). He has also played with the Arizona Coyotes, New York Rangers, Carolina Hurricanes, and Philadelphia Flyers as well as SKA Saint Petersburg in the Kontinental Hockey League (KHL).

DeAngelo was born in Sewell, New Jersey, and played minor ice hockey there until the age of 14, when he joined the Cedar Rapids RoughRiders to become the youngest ever player for the United States Hockey League. Although DeAngelo's season with the RoughRiders ended early due to a knee injury, he was taken by the Sarnia Sting of the Ontario Hockey League (OHL) in the second round of the 2011 OHL Priority Selection Draft. He had a strong offensive output for the Sting, scoring 58 points in his sophomore season. He was traded to the Sault Ste. Marie Greyhounds in 2015, with whom he won both the Max Kaminsky Trophy for OHL defensemen, and the CHL Defenceman of the Year award.

The Tampa Bay Lightning selected DeAngelo 19th overall in the 2014 NHL entry draft, and he signed a three-year, entry-level contract with them later that year. After one season with their American Hockey League affiliate, the Syracuse Crunch, DeAngelo was traded to the Coyotes, and he made his NHL debut in 2016. He was again traded, this time to the Rangers, in 2017, and steadily improved his performance until the 2019–20 NHL season was cut short due to the COVID-19 pandemic. He signed with Carolina after the Rangers bought out his contract in 2021, but was traded to Philadelphia in 2022. DeAngelo became the first player in NHL history to be bought out of his contract twice after Philadelphia terminated his contract in 2023; he subsequently returned to Carolina.

== Early life ==
The youngest of four siblings, DeAngelo was born in Sewell, New Jersey, shortly after his family moved there. Growing up in Washington Township, he began playing minor ice hockey in South Jersey at Hollydell Ice Arena in Sewell, and was known for his competitive nature. In addition to playing for the Mercer Chiefs of the Atlantic Youth Hockey League, DeAngelo dabbled in baseball and basketball. DeAngelo was also close to his grandparents, and his paternal grandfather Lou would drive him to and from the local ice rink during his youth hockey career. In 2008, he appeared in the Quebec International Pee-Wee Hockey Tournament with the Philadelphia Flyers' minor hockey affiliate.

== Playing career ==
=== Amateur ===
DeAngelo left Washington Township at the age of 14 to play junior ice hockey for the Cedar Rapids RoughRiders of the United States Hockey League (USHL). He was the youngest player in USHL history, often competing with college athletes. DeAngelo played 28 games with the RoughRiders in the 2010–11 USHL season, scoring one goal and 14 assists for a total of 15 points. In January 2011, he suffered a broken patella while blocking a slapshot in a game against the Des Moines Buccaneers, and the injury kept him out for the rest of the season.

After watching his performance in the USHL, the Sarnia Sting of the Ontario Hockey League (OHL) selected DeAngelo in the second round, 24th overall, of the 2011 OHL Priority Selection Draft. DeAngelo considered continuing with the USHL, which carried a potential invitation to the USA Hockey National Team Development Program, but chose to sign with Sarnia because it offered him a faster opportunity to progress his career than waiting to play college hockey. He struggled to adjust to the new league, saying that it took "[m]aybe 15, 20 games before I started getting power-play time and was able to do what I do". As a rookie in the 2011–12 OHL season, DeAngelo scored 23 points in 68 games. He found his stride in the 2012–13 season, improving to 58 points in 62 games, the fifth-highest for Sarnia that season.

Beginning in 2013–14, DeAngelo's on-ice behavior began to overshadow his athletic performance. He was removed from the ice during the second period of the Sting's game against the Guelph Storm on January 31, 2014, and the OHL released a statement on February 14 that DeAngelo would be suspended for eight games following a violation of the league's Harassment and Abuse/Diversity Policy. The OHL statement also revealed that this was DeAngelo's second suspension that season for violating the Abuse/Diversity policy, but that this was the first time his comments were directed towards a teammate. The details of his first suspension were kept confidential. Later in the season, DeAngelo received a two-game suspension for abuse of an official. He returned on March 14 for the final game of the season, against the Erie Otters, but was ejected in the third period for another abuse of an official violation.

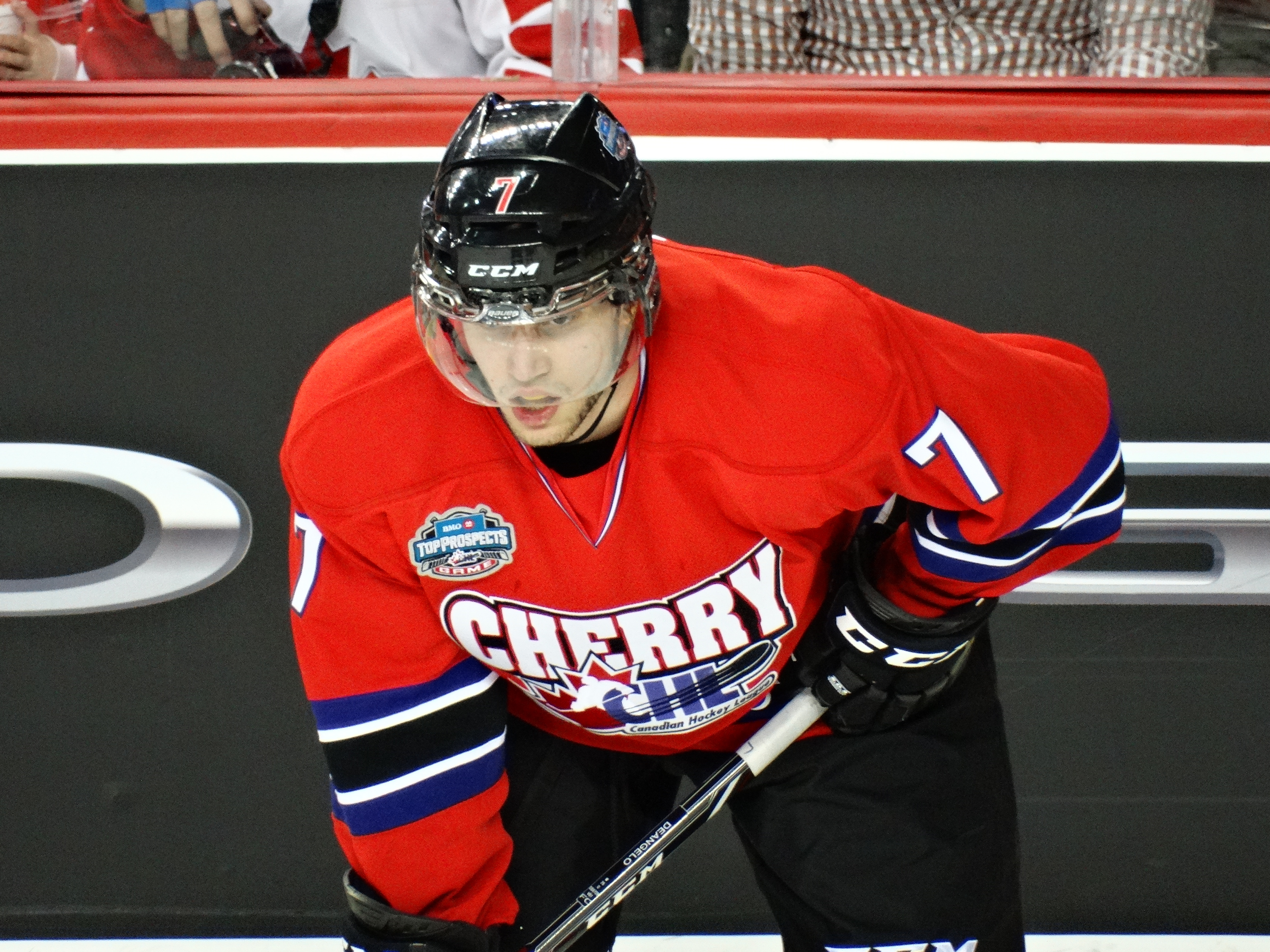
DeAngelo at the CHL/NHL Top Prospects Game

Going into the 2014 National Hockey League draft, DeAngelo was considered a top North American prospect. He led all OHL defensemen in scoring with 71 season points (15 goals and 56 assists), and was ranked No. 10 in the NHL Central Scouting Bureau's 2014 midterm report. He also made an appearance for Team Cherry at the 2014 CHL/NHL Top Prospects Game. On June 27, 2014, the Tampa Bay Lightning selected DeAngelo in the first round, 19th overall, at the 2014 NHL entry draft. Lightning director of amateur scouting Al Murray addressed DeAngelo's past suspensions, saying he believed that some of the incidents were "blown out of proportion", while general manager Steve Yzerman said that the organization believed "he'll change and grow up". He signed a three-year, entry-level contract with the team on December 2, 2014.

On January 7, 2015, the Sting traded DeAngelo to the Sault Ste. Marie Greyhounds in exchange for Anthony Salinitri and three future draft picks. At the time, he had 38 points in 29 season games with the Sting. At the end of the season, DeAngelo was awarded the Max Kaminsky Trophy, given to the OHL's Most Outstanding Defenseman of the Year. He led all defensemen for scoring that season, with 89 points in 55 games, including 25 multi-point games. He was the fourth Greyhound in OHL history to receive the award. He was also named the CHL Defenceman of the Year for the 2014–15 season.

=== Professional ===
==== Tampa Bay Lightning ====
After attending training camp in 2015, DeAngelo was assigned to the Lightning's 2015 American Hockey League (AHL) affiliate, the Syracuse Crunch. After accruing no penalty minutes in his first 19 AHL games, he was given two 10-minute game misconduct penalties in a December 7 match against the Albany Devils, first for conduct against Joseph Blandisi, and then for commentary against a referee. While he had an offensively-productive season with the Crunch, scoring six goals and 37 assists in 69 games, DeAngelo was also a healthy scratch for eight games, a decision rumored to be a combination of behavioral issues and poor defensive ability.

==== Arizona Coyotes ====
On June 25, 2016, in the midst of the 2016 NHL entry draft, the Lightning traded DeAngelo to the Arizona Coyotes in exchange for the No. 37 overall draft pick, with which they selected defenseman Libor Hájek. After being recalled from the Tucson Roadrunners to replace an injured Michael Stone, DeAngelo scored his first NHL goal in his professional debut on November 8, 2016, scoring on Colorado Avalanche goalie Calvin Pickard in the second period of a 4–2 win. His first NHL assist came later that week, assisting Radim Vrbata in a 2–1 loss to the Boston Bruins.

On January 1, 2017, DeAngelo was suspended for three games for physical assault of a referee during a 4–2 loss to the Calgary Flames the day before. The incident occurred towards the end of the second period, when DeAngelo was being steered away from a scrum and shoved away the official's hands. In addition to the suspension, he was required to forfeit $14,388.90 to the Players' Emergency Assistance Fund. DeAngelo finished his first NHL season with five goals and nine assists in 39 games.

==== New York Rangers ====
On June 23, 2017, the Coyotes traded DeAngelo, as well as the seventh overall pick in the 2017 NHL entry draft, to the New York Rangers in exchange for center Derek Stepan and goaltender Antti Raanta. He started ten games with the Rangers in the 2017–18 season before being sent down to the Hartford Wolf Pack of the AHL, with whom he scored 13 points in 29 games. After Kevin Shattenkirk suffered a knee injury in January 2018, DeAngelo was called back up to take his place. DeAngelo suffered a sprained ankle during a match against the Carolina Hurricanes on March 12, and missed the final weeks of the season to recover. Ryan Sproul was called up to replace him, and he finished the season with eight assists in 32 NHL games.

DeAngelo's on-ice performance and character showed signs of improvement during the 2018–19 season. He scored 30 points in 61 games, and his 26 assists tied DeAngelo with Shattenkirk and Mats Zuccarello for third-highest among the Rangers. Although DeAngelo also led the team in penalty minutes with 77, coaches and sports journalists noted that he was showing more discretion in when to respond aggressively. DeAngelo credited his development to the guidance of first-year coach David Quinn, telling reporters that, "it's been nice to have a coach that communicates more". Quinn had a notable intolerance for the outbursts that had characterized the earlier part of DeAngelo's career; the player was a healthy scratch for about 20 games during the season. Despite serving on the top defensive pair with Marc Staal, Quinn benched DeAngelo for two games in a row due to what he said was a "maturity issue" stemming from a game against the Philadelphia Flyers. DeAngelo was also part of a high-profile incident in which he knocked Kyle Okposo of the Buffalo Sabres unconscious in the third period of a 6–2 Rangers victory. Okposo was later diagnosed with his third concussion in as many years.

After the 2018–19 season, DeAngelo became a restricted free agent. Salary negotiations dragged into the Rangers' training camp before DeAngelo agreed to a one-year, $925,000 deal on September 20, 2019, less than two weeks before the start of the season. DeAngelo's stock continued to rise during the 2019–20 season. He scored 53 points, 15 goals and 38 assists, in 68 regular season games, the fourth among all NHL defensemen, before the season was shut down due to the COVID-19 pandemic. DeAngelo told reporters that "I struggled a little bit early on – maybe the first five, six games I wasn't happy with where my game was – and then from there I kind of picked it up and started to feel real confident." His best game came on January 9, 2020, when DeAngelo scored a hat trick in a 6–3 win over the New Jersey Devils. He was the first Rangers defenseman to do so since Reijo Ruotsalainen in 1982.

On October 15, 2020, the Rangers signed DeAngelo to a two-year, $9.6 million contract extension. On opening night of the 2020–21 season, DeAngelo took an unsportsmanlike conduct penalty that Quinn called "undisciplined", and he was subsequently benched for the second game of the season. General manager Jeff Gorton later said that DeAngelo "wasn't able to move on from that" incident, and that he was told that, if there was another behavioral incident, he would be placed on waivers. On January 31, 2021, following reports that DeAngelo had a physical altercation with Rangers goaltender Alexandar Georgiev following a 5–4 overtime loss to the Pittsburgh Penguins, the Rangers placed DeAngelo on waivers. He cleared the process and was officially assigned to the team's taxi squad, but Gorton clarified that the assignment was a formality, and that DeAngelo would be kept away from his teammates and other taxi squad skaters. In a press conference after the altercation, Gorton told reporters that DeAngelo had "played his last game for the Rangers". In only six games that season, DeAngelo had one assist and a −6 plus–minus rating.

On July 23, 2021, the Rangers placed DeAngelo on unconditional waivers, allowing the team to buy out the remainder of his contract and releasing him as a free agent.

==== Carolina Hurricanes ====
On July 28, 2021, the Carolina Hurricanes signed DeAngelo to a one-year, $1 million contract. The signing was controversial among Hurricanes fans, who were aware of DeAngelo's reputation and lamenting the off-season departure of defenseman Dougie Hamilton, but after recording eight points in the first seven games of the season, DeAngelo was subject to cheers at PNC Arena. On October 30, DeAngelo registered his first Gordie Howe hat trick with a goal, an assist, and a fight with Reese Johnson of the Chicago Blackhawks.

==== Philadelphia Flyers ====
On July 8, 2022, the Hurricanes traded DeAngelo to the Philadelphia Flyers in exchange for a fourth-round selection in the 2022 NHL entry draft, a third-round pick in the 2023 draft, and a second-round pick in the 2024 draft. He agreed to terms on the same day, signing a two-year, $10 million contract with the Flyers. On March 8, 2023, the NHL Department of Player Safety issued DeAngelo a two-game suspension for spearing Tampa Bay Lightning forward Corey Perry.

After rumors that he would be traded back to Carolina, DeAngelo was placed on waivers for the purpose of a buyout on July 14. This made him the first player in NHL history to be bought out more than once, though he would later be joined by Ryan Suter in 2024.

==== Second stint with Carolina ====
Following his buyout, DeAngelo signed a one-year deal to return to the Hurricanes on July 24, 2023.

==== SKA Saint Petersburg ====
On September 23, 2024, DeAngelo signed a one-year contract with SKA Saint Petersburg of the Kontinental Hockey League (KHL). In the 2024–25 season, DeAngelo added an instant offensive punch from the blueline and was selected to play in the KHL All-Star Game.

On January 14, after three consecutive losses, and two games after being benched for the third period by coach Roman Rotenberg for what the coach described as a "hockey situation", DeAngelo and SKA mutually agreed to terminate his contract, officially for family reasons. He ended his tenure with SKA having recorded 6 goals and 32 points through 34 regular season appearances.

==== New York Islanders ====
On January 24, 2025, having returned to North America as a free agent, DeAngelo was signed to a one-year, league-minimum contract with the New York Islanders for the remainder of the 2024–25 NHL season. On July 1st, 2025, the Islanders signed DeAngelo to another one-year contract for the 2025-2026 season.

== International play ==
DeAngelo first represented the United States at the under-18 Ivan Hlinka Memorial Tournament in 2012. He registered three assists in the final game of the tournament, a 5–3 win against Slovakia, and the US finished in seventh place.

In 2015, DeAngelo was one of 22 skaters named to the US junior team for the 2015 World Junior Ice Hockey Championships. He scored one of three goals in a 5–3 loss to Canada during the preliminary round. Although he scored again against Russia in the quarterfinals, the US lost 3–2 and was eliminated from the competition.

== Playing style ==
DeAngelo is primarily an offensive-minded defenseman, with what Rangers coach David Quinn once described as a "world-class skill" as a playmaker. Most of his points have come from assists; through the first part of the 2019–20 season, DeAngelo played a role in 61.7 percent of all Rangers points that were scored during his time on the ice. He is also known for his skill on the power play. In 2019–20, he was third on the Rangers with power-play points, behind forwards Mika Zibanejad and Artemi Panarin. One area in which his playing has suffered is on the defensive end, which contributed to his trade away from the Lightning.

== Personal life ==
In 2018, DeAngelo participated in the Checking for Charity tournament, a summer hockey tournament in South Jersey that raises money for charities of the team's choice. DeAngelo and his team chose to raise money for the Wounded Warrior Project. He participated in the tournament again in 2021 alongside fellow NHL players Adam Fox, Joel Farabee and Oliver Wahlstrom.

Throughout his NHL career, DeAngelo has been known for his frequent use of social media. Unlike many of his teammates, who were not active on social media, he used Twitter and Instagram to engage with ice hockey fans. One of his earliest viral tweets was in response to a graph showing teammate Ryan Strome's shooting percentage, to which DeAngelo responded, "@strome18 has been one of our best players since being traded here last year. Watch the games." When the NHL season was suspended due to the COVID-19 pandemic, DeAngelo began using his social media accounts to voice his support for then-President Donald Trump and express skepticism over the severity of the pandemic.

After Trump was banned from using Twitter in light of the 2021 United States Capitol attack, DeAngelo announced that he was deactivating his account and joining the conservative social media platform Parler instead.

== Career statistics ==
=== Regular season and playoffs ===
| | | | Regular season | | | | | Playoffs |
| Season | Team | League | GP | G | A | Pts | PIM | GP | G | A | Pts | PIM |
|---|---|---|---|---|---|---|---|---|---|---|---|---|
| 2008–09 | Mercer Chiefs 13U AAA | AYHL | 29 | 31 | 29 | 60 | 176 | — | — | — | — | — |
| 2009–10 | Westchester Express 16U AAA | EJEPL | 7 | 5 | 2 | 7 | 0 | — | — | — | — | — |
| 2010–11 | Cedar Rapids RoughRiders | USHL | 28 | 1 | 14 | 15 | 19 | — | — | — | — | — |
| 2011–12 | Sarnia Sting | OHL | 68 | 6 | 17 | 23 | 46 | 6 | 1 | 0 | 1 | 2 |
| 2012–13 | Sarnia Sting | OHL | 62 | 9 | 49 | 58 | 60 | 4 | 1 | 2 | 3 | 8 |
| 2013–14 | Sarnia Sting | OHL | 51 | 15 | 56 | 71 | 90 | — | — | — | — | — |
| 2014–15 | Sarnia Sting | OHL | 29 | 10 | 28 | 38 | 64 | — | — | — | — | — |
| 2014–15 | Sault Ste. Marie Greyhounds | OHL | 26 | 15 | 36 | 51 | 51 | 13 | 0 | 16 | 16 | 18 |
| 2015–16 | Syracuse Crunch | AHL | 69 | 6 | 37 | 43 | 84 | — | — | — | — | — |
| 2016–17 | Tucson Roadrunners | AHL | 25 | 3 | 13 | 16 | 31 | — | — | — | — | — |
| 2016–17 | Arizona Coyotes | NHL | 39 | 5 | 9 | 14 | 37 | — | — | — | — | — |
| 2017–18 | New York Rangers | NHL | 32 | 0 | 8 | 8 | 11 | — | — | — | — | — |
| 2017–18 | Hartford Wolf Pack | AHL | 29 | 2 | 11 | 13 | 17 | — | — | — | — | — |
| 2018–19 | New York Rangers | NHL | 61 | 4 | 26 | 30 | 77 | — | — | — | — | — |
| 2019–20 | New York Rangers | NHL | 68 | 15 | 38 | 53 | 47 | 3 | 0 | 1 | 1 | 16 |
| 2020–21 | New York Rangers | NHL | 6 | 0 | 1 | 1 | 4 | — | — | — | — | — |
| 2021–22 | Carolina Hurricanes | NHL | 64 | 10 | 41 | 51 | 56 | 14 | 1 | 9 | 10 | 12 |
| 2022–23 | Philadelphia Flyers | NHL | 70 | 11 | 31 | 42 | 73 | — | — | — | — | — |
| 2023–24 | Carolina Hurricanes | NHL | 31 | 3 | 8 | 11 | 24 | 9 | 0 | 2 | 2 | 6 |
| 2024–25 | SKA Saint Petersburg | KHL | 34 | 6 | 26 | 32 | 33 | — | — | — | — | — |
| 2024–25 | New York Islanders | NHL | 35 | 4 | 15 | 19 | 10 | — | — | — | — | — |
| 2025–26 | New York Islanders | NHL | 76 | 5 | 30 | 35 | 43 | — | — | — | — | — |
| NHL totals | | | 482 | 57 | 207 | 264 | 382 | 26 | 1 | 12 | 13 | 34 |

=== International ===
| Year | Team | Event | Result | GP | G | A | Pts | PIM |
|---|---|---|---|---|---|---|---|---|
| 2012 | United States | IH18 | 7th | 4 | 0 | 6 | 6 | 26 |
| 2015 | United States | WJC | 5th | 5 | 2 | 1 | 3 | 4 |
| Junior totals | | | | 9 | 2 | 7 | 9 | 30 |

== Awards and honors ==
| Accomplishment | Year | Ref |
CHL
| CHL/NHL Top Prospects Game | 2014 | |
| Max Kaminsky Trophy | 2015 | |
| CHL Defenceman of the Year | 2015 | |
KHL
| KHL All-Star Game | 2025 | |

Awards and achievements
| Preceded by Jonathan Drouin | Tampa Bay Lightning first-round draft pick 2014 | Succeeded by Brett Howden |
