= Jim Piggott Memorial Trophy =

Western Hockey League award

The Jim Piggott Memorial Trophy is presented annually to the Western Hockey League player selected as the most proficient in his first year of competition. The award is named after Saskatoon Blades founder Jim Piggott, one of the founding fathers of what is today the Western Hockey League.

The trophy was previously named the Stewart "Butch" Paul Memorial Trophy. Butch Paul was a player for the Edmonton Oil Kings in the 1960s, leading the team to three straight Western Canada Championships, and a Memorial Cup in 1963. He later played for the Detroit Red Wings of the National Hockey League (NHL) and during his second year in the organization he died in a car accident on March 25, 1966.

== Winners ==
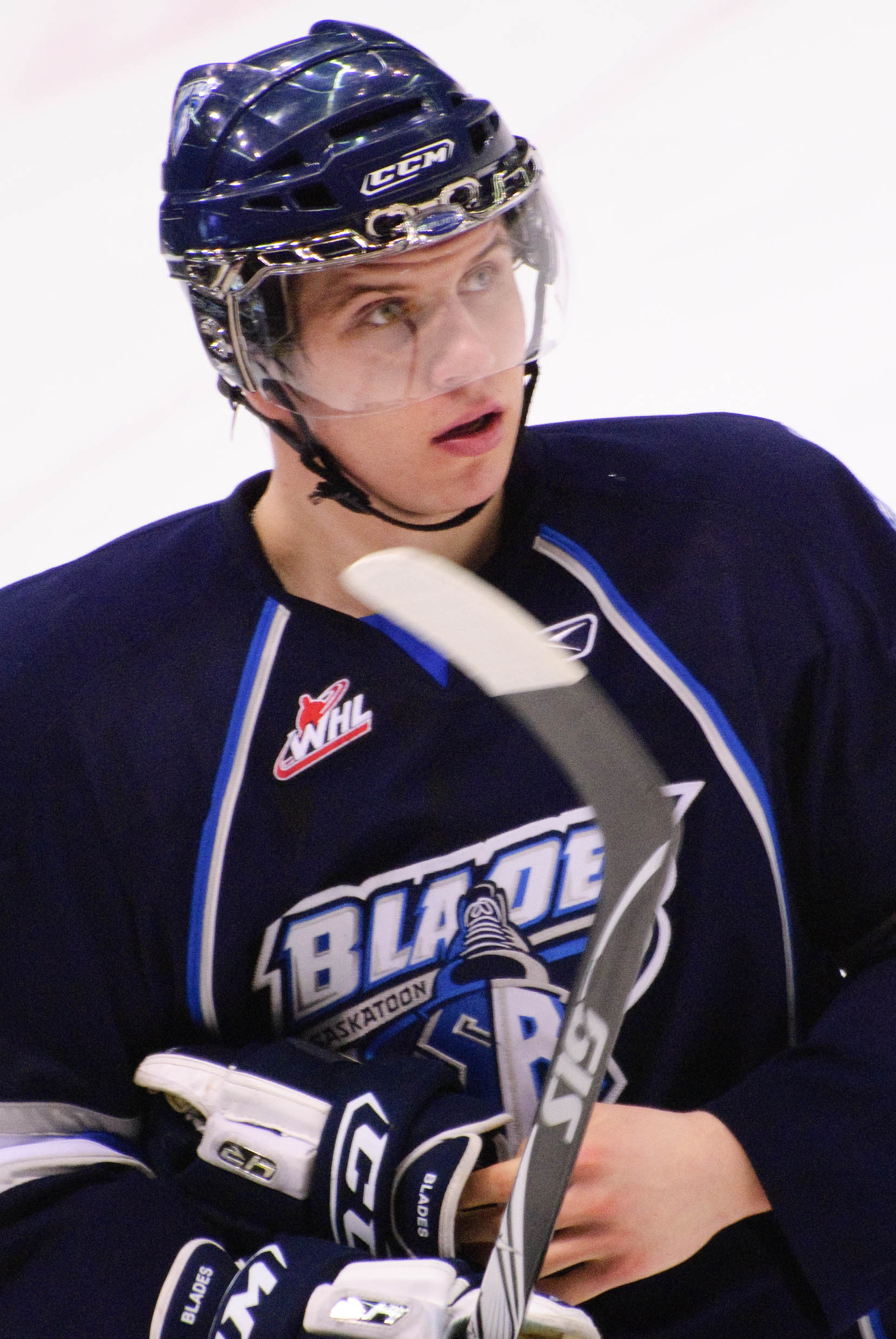
Brayden Schenn, winner in 2007–08.

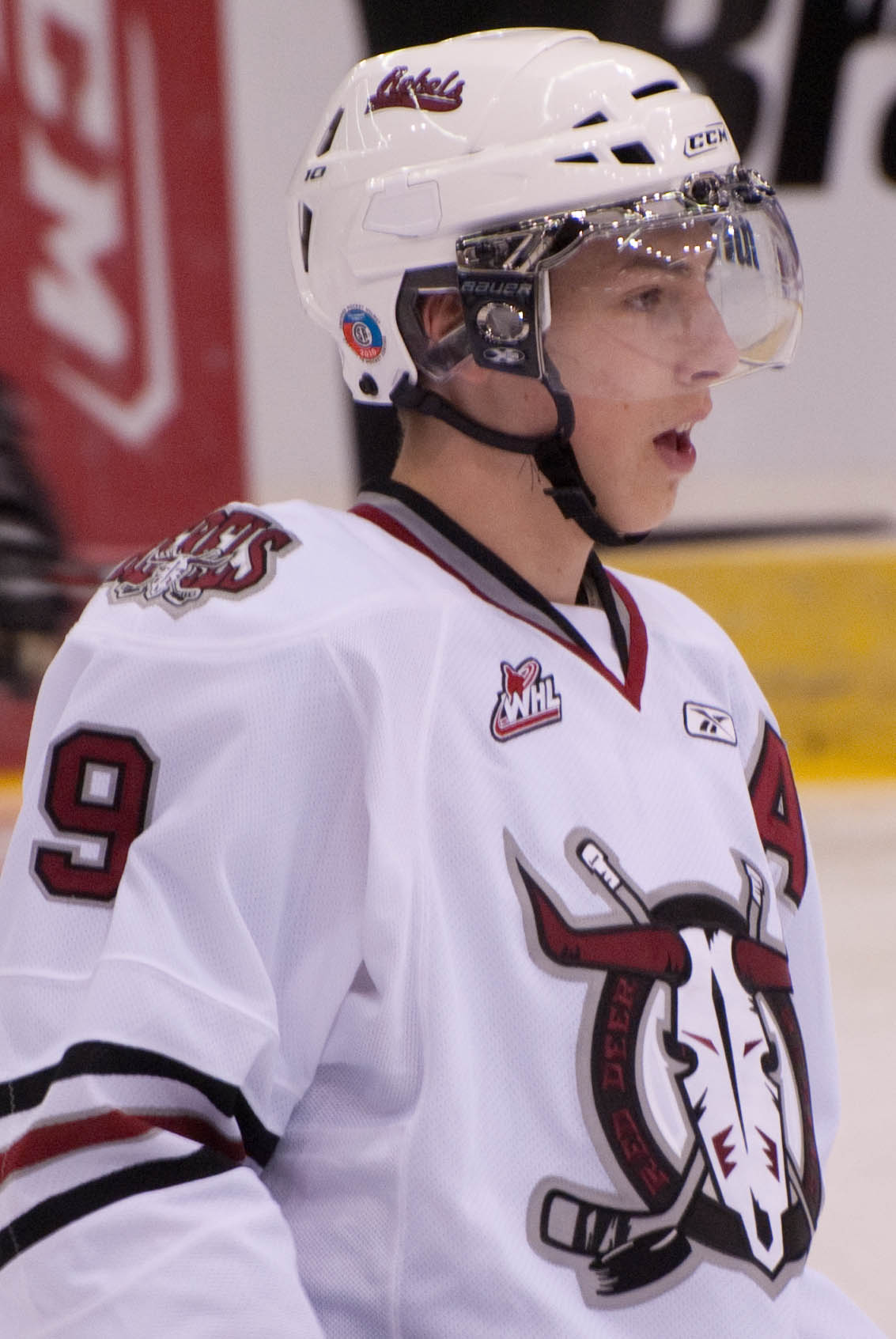
Ryan Nugent-Hopkins, winner in 2009–10.

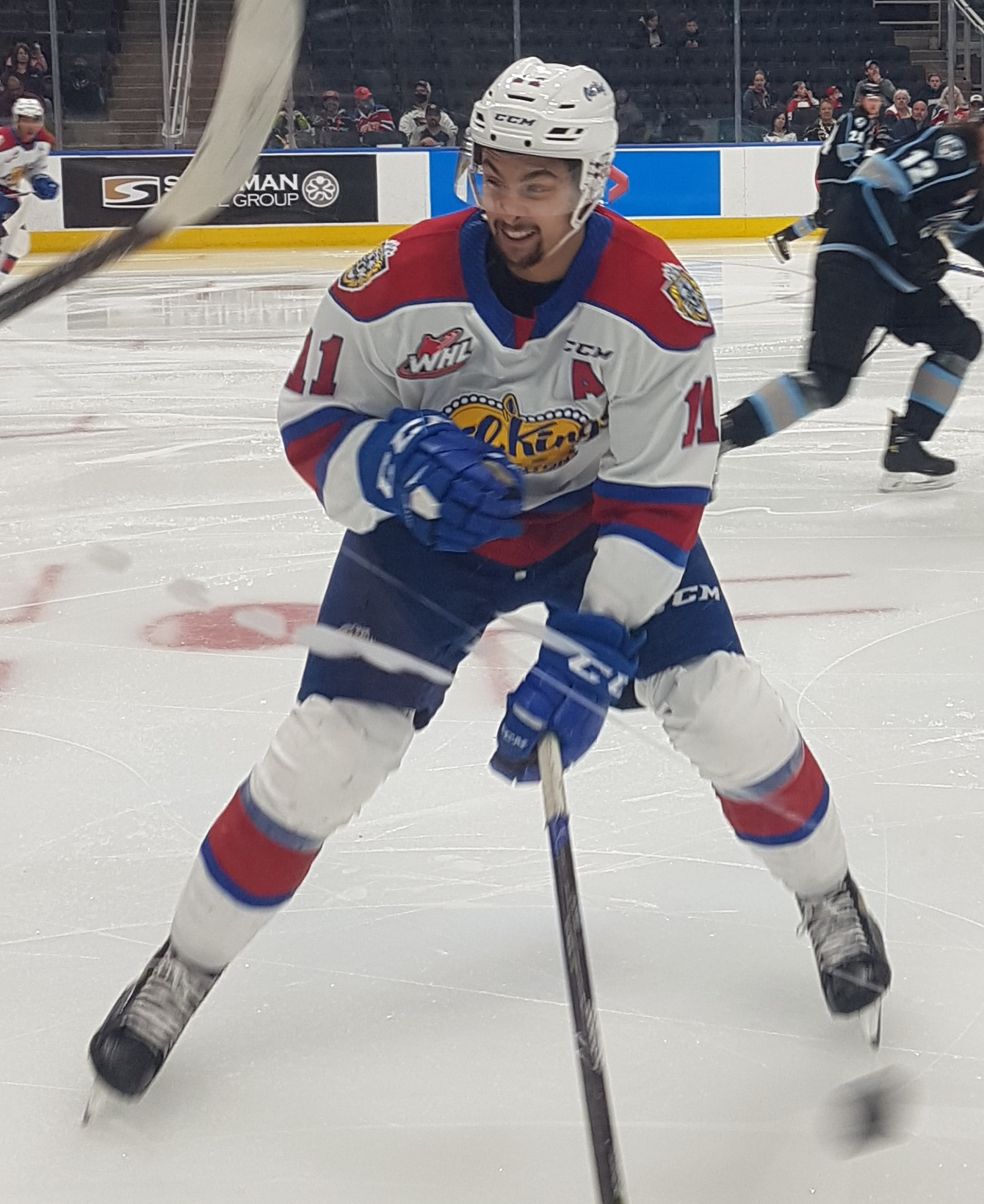
Dylan Guenther, winner in 2019–20.

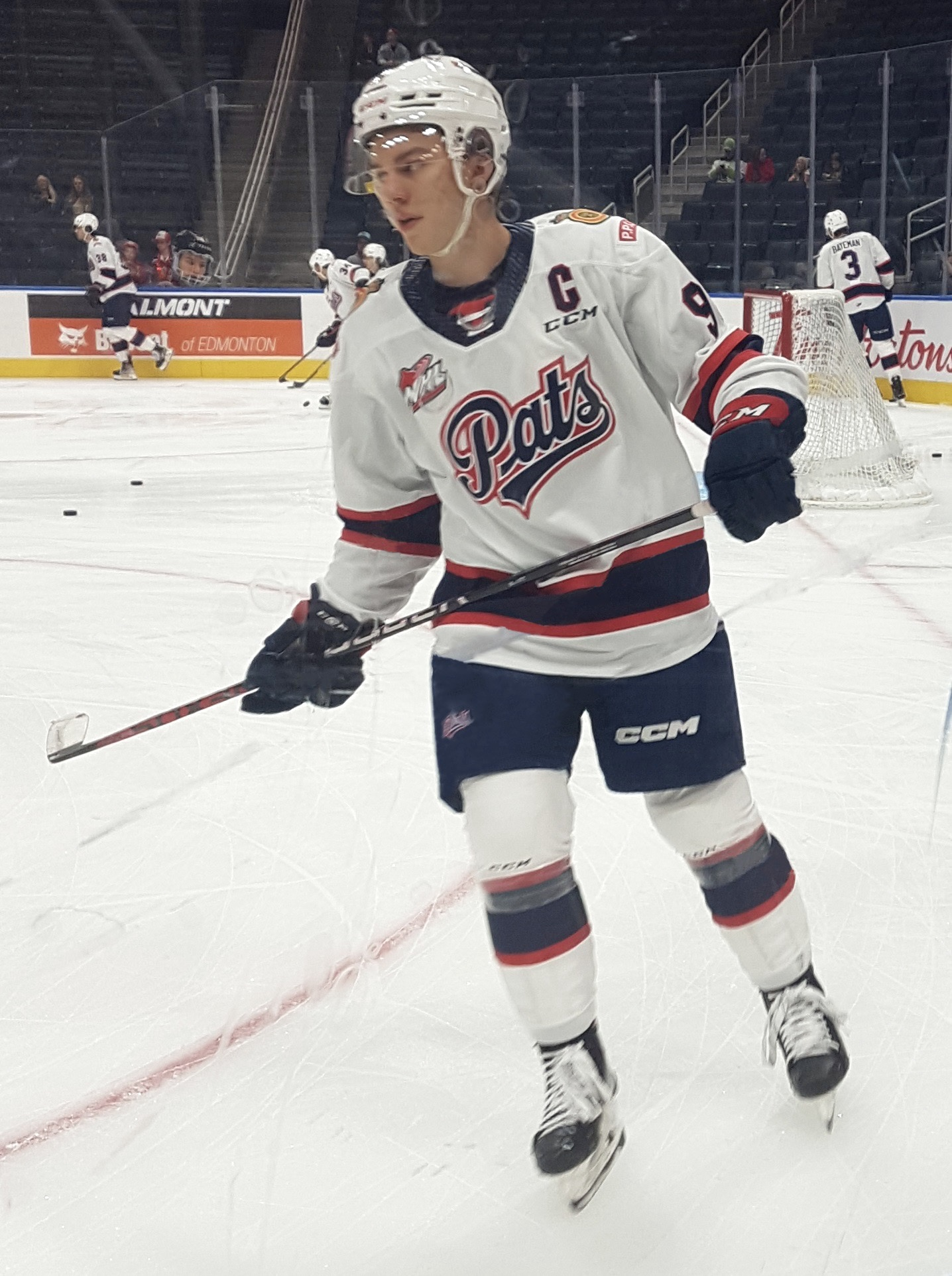
Connor Bedard, winner in 2020–21.

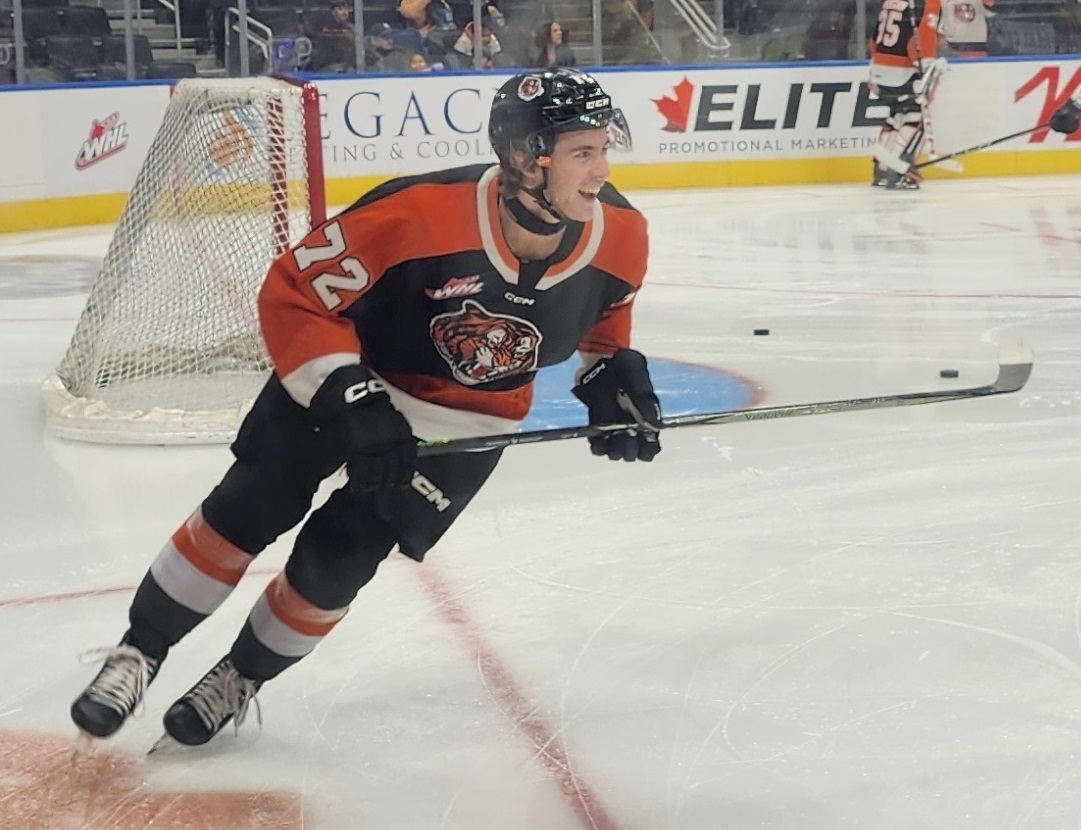
Gavin McKenna, winner in 2023–24.

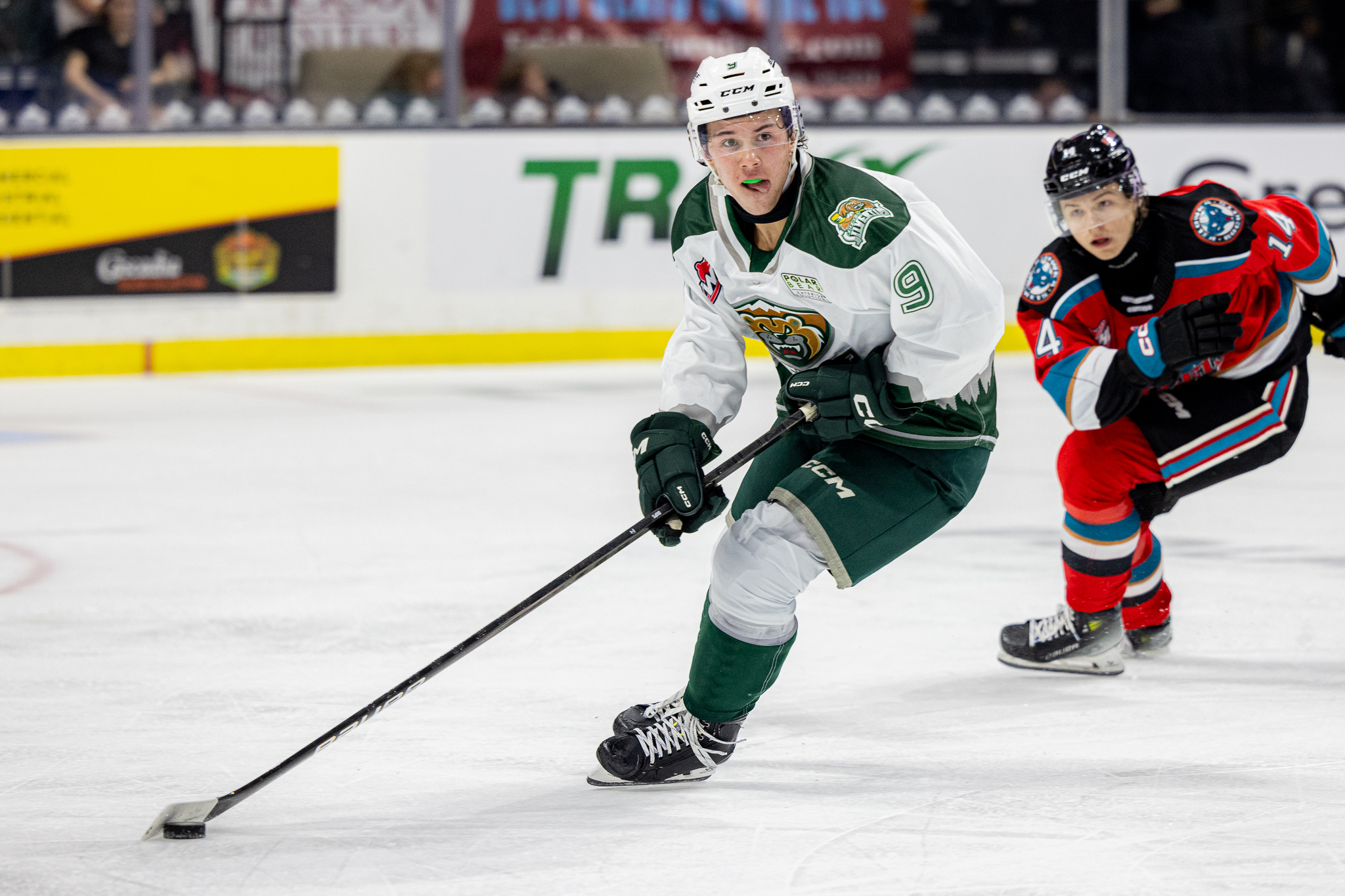
Landon DuPont, winner in 2024–25.

denotes also named CHL Rookie of the Year

Stewart "Butch" Paul Memorial Trophy
Season	Player	Team
1966–67	Ron Garwasiuk	Regina Pats
1967–68	Ron Fairbrother	Saskatoon Blades
1968–69	Ron Williams	Edmonton Oil Kings
1969–70	Gene Carr	Flin Flon Bombers
1970–71	Stan Weir	Medicine Hat Tigers
1971–72	Dennis Sobchuk	Regina Pats
1972–73	Rick Blight	Brandon Wheat Kings
1973–74	Cam Connor	Flin Flon Bombers
1974–75	Don Murdoch	Medicine Hat Tigers
1975–76	Steve Tambellini	Lethbridge Hurricanes
1976–77	Brian Propp	Brandon Wheat Kings
1977–78	(tie) Keith Brown	Portland Winter Hawks
	(tie) John Ogrodnick	New Westminster Bruins
1978–79	Kelly Kisio	Calgary Wranglers
1979–80	Grant Fuhr	Victoria Cougars
1980–81	Dave Michayluk	Regina Pats
1981–82	Dale Derkatch	Regina Pats
1982–83	Dan Hodgson	Prince Albert Raiders
1983–84	Cliff Ronning	New Westminster Bruins
1984–85	Mark MacKay	Moose Jaw Warriors
1985–86^{1}	(West-tie) Ron Shudra	Kamloops Blazers
	(West-tie) Dave Waldie	Portland Winter Hawks
	(East) Neil Brady	Medicine Hat Tigers
1986–87^{1}	(West) Dennis Holland	Portland Winter Hawks
	(East) Joe Sakic	Swift Current Broncos
Jim Piggott Memorial Trophy
Season	Player	Team
1987–88	Stu Barnes	New Westminster Bruins
1988–89	Wes Walz	Lethbridge Hurricanes
1989–90	Petr Nedved	Seattle Thunderbirds
1990–91	Donevan Hextall	Prince Albert Raiders
1991–92	Ashley Buckberger	Swift Current Broncos
1992–93	Jeff Friesen	Regina Pats
1993–94	Wade Redden	Brandon Wheat Kings
1994–95	Todd Robinson	Portland Winter Hawks
1995–96	Chris Phillips	Prince Albert Raiders
1996–97	Donovan Nunweiler	Moose Jaw Warriors
1997–98	Marian Hossa	Portland Winter Hawks
1998–99	Pavel Brendl	Calgary Hitmen
1999–2000	Dan Blackburn	Kootenay Ice
2000–01	Scottie Upshall	Kamloops Blazers
2001–02	Braydon Coburn	Portland Winter Hawks
2002–03	Matt Ellison	Red Deer Rebels
2003–04	Gilbert Brule	Vancouver Giants
2004–05	Tyler Plante	Brandon Wheat Kings
2005–06	Peter Mueller	Everett Silvertips
2006–07	Kyle Beach	Everett Silvertips
2007–08	Brayden Schenn	Brandon Wheat Kings
2008–09	Brett Connolly	Prince George Cougars
2009–10	Ryan Nugent-Hopkins	Red Deer Rebels
2010–11	Mathew Dumba	Red Deer Rebels
2011–12	Sam Reinhart	Kootenay Ice
2012–13	Seth Jones	Portland Winterhawks
2013–14	Nick Merkley	Kelowna Rockets
2014–15	Nolan Patrick	Brandon Wheat Kings
2015–16	Matthew Phillips	Victoria Royals
2016–17	Aleksi Heponiemi	Swift Current Broncos
2017–18	Dylan Cozens	Lethbridge Hurricanes
2018–19	Brayden Tracey	Moose Jaw Warriors
2019–20	Dylan Guenther	Edmonton Oil Kings
2020–21	Connor Bedard	Regina Pats
2021–22	Brayden Yager	Moose Jaw Warriors
2022–23	Ryder Ritchie	Prince Albert Raiders
2023–24	Gavin McKenna	Medicine Hat Tigers
2024–25	Landon DuPont	Everett Silvertips
2025–26	JP Hurlbert	Kamloops Blazers

^{1}The WHL handed out separate awards for the East and West divisions.

== See also ==
- CHL Rookie of the Year
- Emms Family Award – Ontario Hockey League Rookie of the Year
- RDS Cup – Quebec Maritimes Junior Hockey League Rookie of the Year
