= Landon DuPont =

Canadian ice hockey player (born 2009)

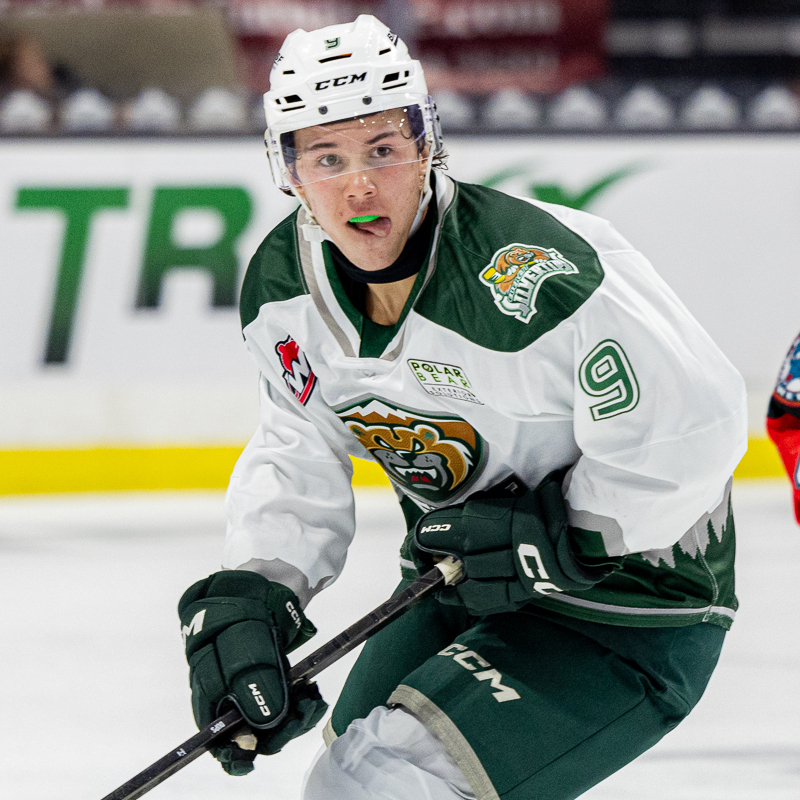
- DuPont with the Everett Silvertips in 2024
- Born: May 28, 2009 (age 17) Calgary, Alberta, Canada
- Height: 6 ft 0 in (183 cm)
- Weight: 190 lb (86 kg; 13 st 8 lb)
- Position: Defence
- Shoots: Right
- NCAA team: Michigan
- NHL draft: Eligible 2027

Landon DuPont (born May 28, 2009) is a Canadian college ice hockey player who is a defenceman for the Michigan Wolverines of the National Collegiate Athletic Association (NCAA). He was the ninth player to be granted exceptional player status in the history of the Canadian Hockey League (CHL). DuPont is considered to be the No. 1 overall prospect for the 2027 NHL entry draft.

== Playing career ==
DuPont played minor ice hockey in Kloten, Switzerland, and Berlin, Germany, often playing with his older brother in the 2006-born age group, three years above his own. He moved to Canada in 2019.

As a 14-year-old, DuPont played in under-18 level for the Edge School in the Canadian Sport School Hockey League (CSSHL), where despite being by far the youngest on the team he was a dominant, centralizing force. In some matches, he would see 40 minutes of time on ice – two-thirds of the game. In the 2023–24 season, he scored 19 goals and 62 points in 30 games, leading his team and setting a league record for single-season points by a defenceman. In the playoffs, he tied the playoff scoring record set by Dylan Guenther with five goals and 16 points en route to a league title and championship MVP award.

On April 8, 2024, it was announced that DuPont would receive exceptional player status to enter the Canadian Hockey League (CHL) in the 2024–25 season, becoming the ninth exceptional status player and the third defenceman. He became the second Western Hockey League (WHL) player to receive exceptional status, after Connor Bedard, and the first defenceman. On May 9, 2024, DuPont was selected first overall in the 2024 WHL prospects draft by the Everett Silvertips, becoming the first top pick in Silvertips history. He signed with the Silvertips on August 6.

From the moment he entered the WHL, DuPont was trusted with a big role on the Silvertips, logging 26 minutes in his debut. He recorded 11 points in his first seven games, more than any other exceptional status player through that span except for Bedard. On February 2, 2025, he recorded his 50th point of the season, becoming the first defenceman aged 16 or younger to reach that threshold since Scott Niedermayer in the 1989–90 season. DuPont finished with 17 goals and 43 assists in 64 games played, and won the Jim Piggott Memorial Trophy as the WHL's rookie of the year. He was later awarded the CHL Rookie of the Year trophy, only the third exceptional status player to earn the award after John Tavares and Shane Wright. The CHL also named him to its All-Rookie and Third All-Star teams.

=== Collegiate career ===
On June 24, 2026, DuPont committed to play college ice hockey at the University of Michigan during the 2026–27 season. In August 2026, ESPN and NHL ranked DuPont as the No. 1 overall prospect in the 2027 NHL entry draft.

== International play ==
At the 2024 World U-17 Hockey Challenge, DuPont was the only 2009-born player on either of the Canadian teams, captaining Canada Red to a silver medal with a team-best four points in as many games before earning tournament all-star honours.

At the 2025 Hlinka Gretzky Cup, DuPont was once again the only 2009-born Canadian, and was one of four alternate captains for the team. The Canadians finished with a bronze medal.

== Personal life ==
DuPont's father Micki DuPont played 23 NHL games across four seasons with the Calgary Flames, Pittsburgh Penguins, and St. Louis Blues, as well as in the American Hockey League (AHL), in various European leagues, and for the Canadian national team.

== Career statistics ==
=== Regular season and playoffs ===
Bold indicates led league

			Regular season					Playoffs
Season	Team	League	GP	G	A	Pts	PIM	GP	G	A	Pts	PIM
2024–25	Everett Silvertips	WHL	64	17	43	60	26	10	5	10	15	6
2025–26	Everett Silvertips	WHL	63	18	55	73	52	18	5	**18**	23	24
WHL totals			127	35	98	133	78	28	10	28	38	30

=== International ===
Year	Team	Event	Result	GP	G	A	Pts	PIM
2024	Canada Red	U17	2nd place, silver medalist(s)	4	0	4	4	2
2025	Canada	HG18	3rd place, bronze medalist(s)	5	0	4	4	2
Junior totals				9	0	8	8	4

== Awards and honours ==
Award	Year	Ref
CHL
CHL Rookie of the Year Award	2025	
All-Rookie Team	2025	
Third All-Star Team	2025	
Memorial Cup All-Star Team	2026	
WHL
Jim Piggott Memorial Trophy	2025	
Ed Chynoweth Cup champion	2026	
