= Gavin McKenna =

Canadian ice hockey player (born 2007)

- McKenna with Penn State in January 2026
- Born: December 20, 2007 (age 18) Whitehorse, Yukon, Canada
- Height: 5 ft 11 in (180 cm)
- Weight: 170 lb (77 kg; 12 st 2 lb)
- Position: Forward
- Shoots: Left
- NHL team: Toronto Maple Leafs
- NHL draft: 1st overall, 2026; Toronto Maple Leafs
- Playing career: 2026–present

Gavin Philip Joseph McKenna (born December 20, 2007) is a Canadian professional ice hockey player who is a forward for the Toronto Maple Leafs of the National Hockey League (NHL). McKenna was selected by the Maple Leafs with the first overall pick in the 2026 NHL entry draft. He played college ice hockey for the Penn State Nittany Lions. McKenna also played three seasons, from 2022 to 2025, in the Western Hockey League (WHL) with the Medicine Hat Tigers.

== Playing career ==
=== Junior ===
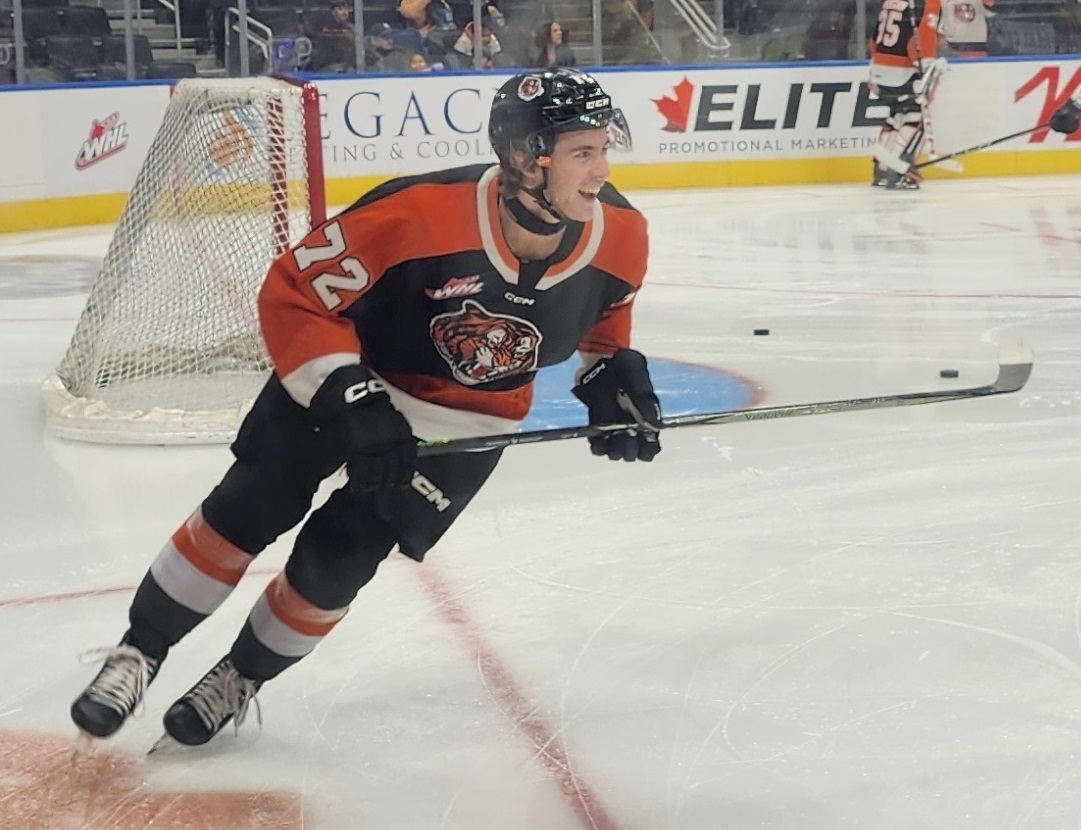
McKenna with the Medicine Hat Tigers in November 2024

McKenna was the first Yukon-born player to be drafted first overall in the Western Hockey League (WHL), being selected in the 2022 bantam draft by the Medicine Hat Tigers. Although he was granted exceptional player status by BC Hockey and Hockey Alberta, the third such player after Connor Bedard and Matthew Savoie, he did not receive exceptional player status with the WHL. He recorded four points in his WHL debut, and finished his first season with 18 points in 16 games. He also appeared in 26 games at the under-18 prep level with the South Alberta Hockey Academy, recording 75 points.

In his first full WHL season in 2023–24, McKenna recorded 34 goals and 97 points in 61 regular season games. In recognition of his achievements, he received the Jim Piggott Memorial Trophy as the WHL's rookie of the year. McKenna called it "a true honour." He also won the CHL Rookie of the Year Award as the best in the three CHL component leagues, and was also named to both the CHL's Third All-Star Team and its All-Rookie Team.

In advance of the 2024–25 season, the Tigers named McKenna an alternate captain. Beginning on November 6, he embarked on a lengthy point streak that extended to 36 games on March 7, breaking the 21st century WHL record held jointly by Connor Bedard and Logan Stankoven. The streak continued until the end of the season, finishing at 40 games. McKenna registered at least one point in all but three games during the regular season, recording 41 goals and a league-leading 88 assists in 56 games. His 129 points was second in the WHL, behind Spokane Chiefs forward Andrew Cristall. McKenna received the Four Broncos Memorial Trophy as the WHL's most valuable player. His point streak extended as the Tigers made a deep run in the playoffs, finally ending at 54 games when he failed to record a point in the second game of the WHL finals. After missing the third and fourth games of the finals with an undisclosed injury, McKenna returned for the title-clinching fifth game, where the Tigers defeated the Chiefs to claim the Ed Chynoweth Cup. He had 9 goals and 38 points in 16 playoff games, the most of any Medicine Hat player. As WHL champions, the Tigers competed at the 2025 Memorial Cup, where they reached the championship final, but were defeated by the Ontario Hockey League champion London Knights. McKenna tied for second in tournament scoring, and scored his team's lone goal in the final. He was named to the Memorial Cup All-Star Team. With the postseason at an end, he received the David Branch Player of the Year Award from the CHL. At age 17, he was the third-youngest player given the distinction, with John Tavares and Sidney Crosby the only 16-year-olds so honoured.

=== Collegiate ===
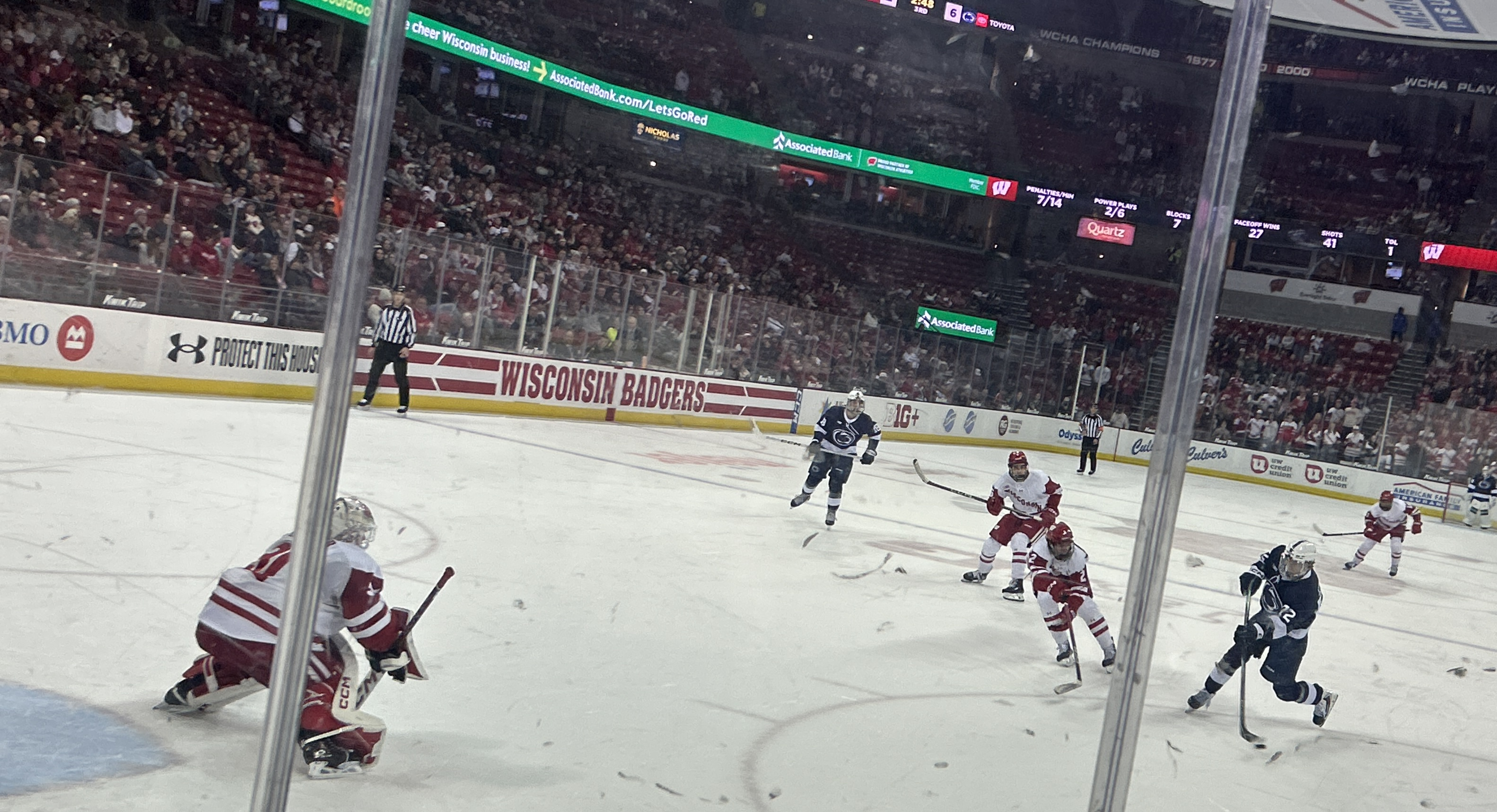
McKenna (right) scoring the goal which completed his first collegiate hat-trick on January 23, 2026

In a game against the Wisconsin Badgers on January 23, 2026, McKenna scored his first collegiate hat-trick. Following the 2024 decision of the American National Collegiate Athletic Association (NCAA) to allow CHL players to be eligible to play in collegiate competition starting with the 2025–26 season, McKenna became the target of significant recruitment campaigns by major American universities. As well, the WHL made what was widely interpreted as a bid to retain him, scheduling two Medicine Hat Tigers pre-season games in McKenna's hometown of Whitehorse. On July 8, 2025, McKenna announced that he had committed to joining the Pennsylvania State University's Nittany Lions for the 2025–26 season, citing a desire to play "against older, heavier, stronger guys" as preparation for a professional career. The Hockey News called his decision to leave the WHL "a huge blow" to Canada's traditional major junior leagues, auguring a new era for youth development in North American ice hockey. As part of his recruitment to Penn State, it was reported McKenna will receive up to US$700,000 in name, image and likeness compensation.

=== Professional ===
McKenna (right) with the Maple Leafs in 2026

McKenna was selected by the Toronto Maple Leafs with the first overall pick of the 2026 NHL entry draft on June 26, 2026. He signed a three-year entry-level contract with the Maple Leafs on July 3, and debuted for them on September 29 in Toronto's home opener. He scored his first career NHL goal on October 6 against the Nashville Predators.

== International play ==
Medal record

Men's ice hockey

Representing Canada

World Junior Championships
Bronze medal – third place	2026 United States	

World U18 Championships
Gold medal – first place	2024 Finland	

Hlinka Gretzky Cup
Gold medal – first place	2024 Canada	

McKenna made his international debut for the Canada under-18 team at the 2024 World U18 Championships. He led Canada in scoring with 10 goals and 10 assists across seven games as the team made a deep run to the gold medal game. In the semifinal against Sweden, McKenna set a new Canadian record for most points at a single under-18 tournament with his 16th, surpassing Macklin Celebrini and Tyson Jost. He scored a hat-trick with an additional assist in the gold medal game as Canada secured the title with a 6–4 victory over the United States. He was named to the Media All-Star Team for the event.

At the 2024 Hlinka Gretzky Cup, McKenna scored the game-winning goal in a 2–1 victory over Sweden to clinch a sweep of the preliminary round. He finished the event with three goals and six points in five games as the Canadians continued undefeated to a gold medal.

McKenna represented the Canada junior team at the 2025 World Junior Championships. He recorded one goal in five games as the Canadians were eliminated by Czechia in the quarterfinals.

In December 2025, McKenna was selected to represent Canada at the 2026 World Junior Championships. He ranked second in the tournament in scoring with four goals and 10 assists in seven games as the Canadians won the bronze medal. In the 6–4 semifinal loss to Czechia, McKenna was assessed a game misconduct for abuse of officials after he was one of several Canadian players yelling at the referees.

== Personal life ==
McKenna's parents both played ice hockey and his father constructed an outdoor rink for him to practice every winter. He is a distant cousin-by-marriage of Chicago Blackhawks forward Connor Bedard. McKenna is a citizen of the Trʼondëk Hwëchʼin First Nation.

Following an alleged physical altercation on January 31, 2026, in downtown State College, McKenna was charged with felony aggravated assault, misdemeanour simple assault, disorderly conduct, and harassment. He was arraigned on February 4, and released on $20,000 unsecured bail. On February 6, after reviewing a video of the altercation, Centre County District Attorney and State College Police decided that the video was not evidence that McKenna had acted with the intent to cause serious bodily injury, and the aggravated assault charge was dropped. McKenna continues to face the remaining misdemeanor and summary charges.

== Career statistics ==
=== Regular season and playoffs ===
Bold indicates led league

			Regular season					Playoffs
Season	Team	League	GP	G	A	Pts	PIM	GP	G	A	Pts	PIM
2022–23	Medicine Hat Tigers	WHL	16	4	14	18	0	4	1	0	1	0
2023–24	Medicine Hat Tigers	WHL	61	34	63	97	21	5	2	4	6	2
2024–25	Medicine Hat Tigers	WHL	56	41	**88**	129	19	16	9	29	38	6
2025–26	Penn State	B1G	35	15	36	51	36	—	—	—	—	—
WHL totals			133	79	165	244	40	25	12	33	45	8

=== International ===
Year	Team	Event	Result	GP	G	A	Pts	PIM
2023	Canada Red	U17	5th	7	5	3	8	0
2024	Canada	U18	1st place, gold medalist(s)	7	10	10	20	0
2024	Canada	HG18	1st place, gold medalist(s)	5	3	3	6	0
2025	Canada	WJC	5th	5	1	0	1	10
2026	Canada	WJC	3rd place, bronze medalist(s)	7	4	10	14	14
Junior totals				31	23	26	49	24

== Awards and honours ==
Award	Year	Ref
College
Big Ten Scoring Champion	2026	
Big Ten Freshman of the Year	2026	
All-Big Ten Second Team	2026	
All-Big Ten Freshman Team	2026	
AHCA West Second Team All-American	2026	
CHL
CHL Rookie of the Year Award	2024	
All-Rookie Team	2024	
Third All-Star Team	2024	
Memorial Cup All-Star Team	2025	
David Branch Player of the Year Award	2025	
First All-Star Team	2025	
WHL
Jim Piggott Memorial Trophy	2024	
WHL Plus-Minus Award	2025	
Four Broncos Memorial Trophy	2025	
Ed Chynoweth Cup champion	2025	
International
World U18 Championship Media All-Star Team	2024	

Awards and achievements
Preceded by Matthew Schaefer	NHL first overall draft pick 2026	Succeeded by Incumbent
Preceded by Ben Danford	Toronto Maple Leafs first round pick 2026	Succeeded by Incumbent
