= Dan Hamhuis =

Canadian ice hockey player (born 1982)

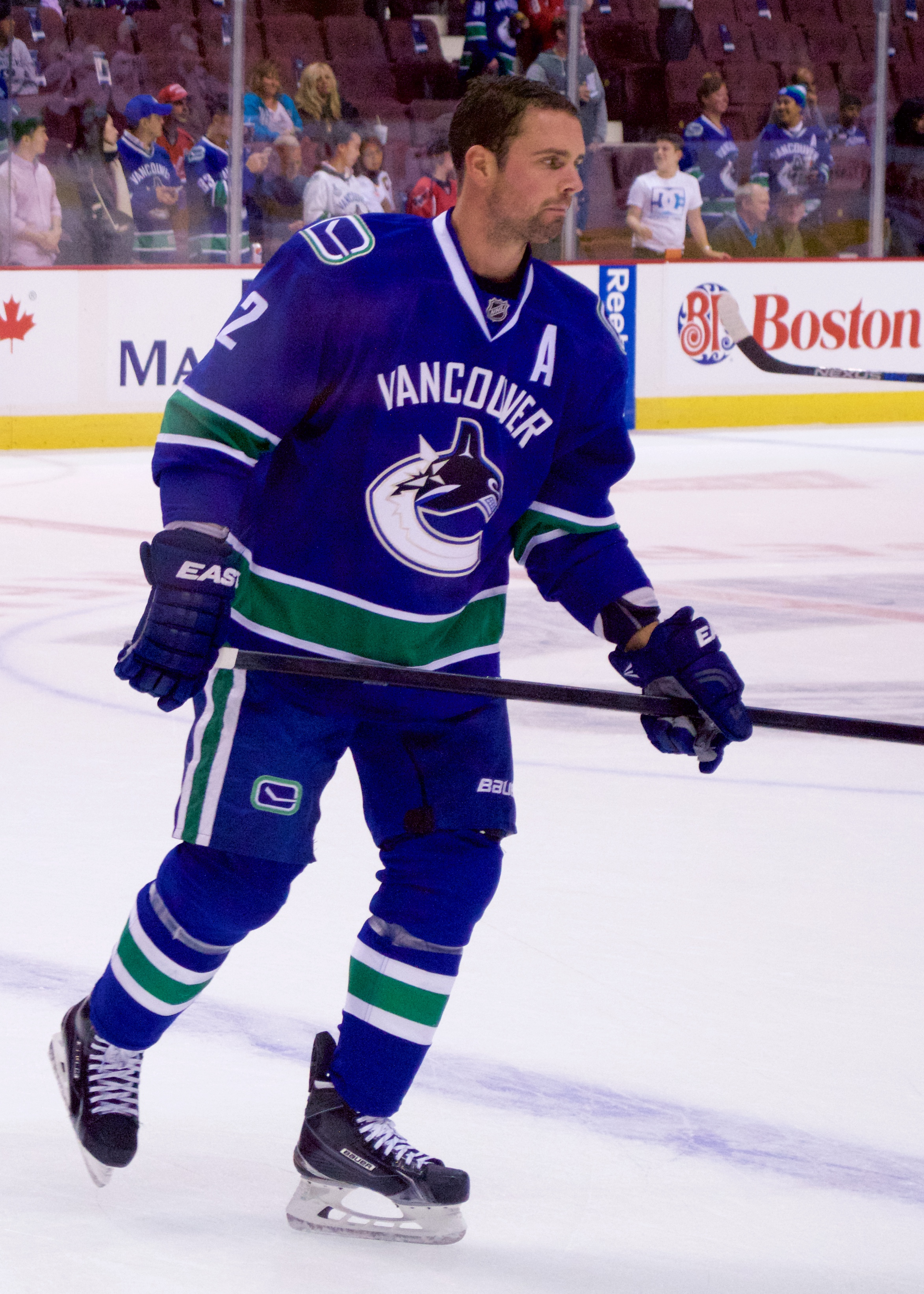
- Hamhuis with the Vancouver Canucks in October 2015
- Born: December 13, 1982 (age 43) Smithers, British Columbia, Canada
- Height: 6 ft 1 in (185 cm)
- Weight: 209 lb (95 kg; 14 st 13 lb)
- Position: Defence
- Shot: Left
- Played for: Nashville Predators; Vancouver Canucks; Dallas Stars
- National team: Canada
- NHL draft: 12th overall, 2001; Nashville Predators
- Playing career: 2002–2020

Daniel Hamhuis (born December 13, 1982) is a Canadian former professional ice hockey player. A defenceman, he was drafted in 2001 by the Nashville Predators of the National Hockey League (NHL).

Hamhuis played major junior hockey with the Prince George Cougars of the Western Hockey League (WHL) and was selected 12th overall by the Nashville Predators in the 2001 NHL entry draft. The following year, he was awarded the Bill Hunter Memorial Trophy and Four Broncos Memorial Trophy as the league's best defenceman and player of the year, respectively; he would also be named the top defenceman in the Canadian Hockey League (CHL), the governing body of major junior hockey in Canada. After a final season in the WHL, Hamhuis made his professional debut with the Milwaukee Admirals of the American Hockey League (AHL), a minor league affiliate of the Predators. He made his NHL debut the next year for Nashville. After five seasons with the club, Hamhuis became an unrestricted free agent and signed a six-year contract with the Canucks. In his first year with the club, he helped Vancouver to the 2011 Stanley Cup Finals, where they lost to the Boston Bruins.

Hamhuis has played in several international tournaments at both the junior and senior levels for Canada. At the 2001 and 2002 World Junior Championships, he won a bronze and silver medal, respectively. He also appeared in four straight World Championships, winning a gold at the 2007 tournament and silver at both the 2008 and 2009 tournaments. On January 7, 2014, he was named to the 2014 Canadian Olympic Hockey Team, winning a gold medal at the 2014 Winter Olympics.

== Playing career ==
=== Early years ===
Hamhuis suffered a broken tibia during his junior draft-eligible season, limiting his exposure to WHL scouts. Consequently, he went unselected in the WHL Bantam Draft. He later admitted to not even being aware of the junior draft until a couple months later. The Prince George Cougars later put Hamhuis on their protected list and he went on to make his junior debut in 1998–99. He recorded a goal and four points over 56 games while being named both Prince George's rookie and scholastic player of the year. The following season, he improved to 10 goals and 33 points in 70 games. He helped Prince George advance to the Conference Finals, scoring two goals and five points in a junior career-high of 13 post-season games. He was also named the Cougars' scholastic player for the year for the second year in a row.

Hamhuis' third WHL season in 2000–01 saw him increase his offensive production to 13 goals and 59 points over 62 games, eighth in scoring among league defencemen. He received WHL West First All-Star Team honours and was named Prince George's most dedicated player. Playing in his NHL draft-eligible season, he participated in the 2001 CHL Top Prospects Game, where he served as captain for his team. Hamhuis was ranked by the NHL Central Scouting Bureau as the second-best North American prospect overall (behind Jason Spezza) and the top defenceman. He went on to be selected with the 12th overall pick in the 2001 NHL entry draft by the Nashville Predators. He was the second defenceman to be selected after the Montreal Canadiens took Mike Komisarek seventh overall. Scouting reports listed him as a physical offensive defenceman with excellent skating, passing and open-ice hitting abilities, as well as a good hockey sense. Having identified his shot as a weaker aspect of his game, he worked on improving it during his junior years. His coach in Prince George likened his playing style to Scott Niedermayer.

Following his draft, Hamhuis attended his first NHL training camp, but was returned to the WHL as an early cut on September 19, 2001. Playing in his fourth season of junior, he recorded career-highs of 50 assists and 60 points in 59 games. At the end of the campaign, he was awarded the Bill Hunter Memorial Trophy and Four Broncos Memorial Trophy as the league's best defenceman and player of the year, respectively. It marked the first time a player had won both awards since Barry Beck in 1977. Hamhuis additionally received the CHL Defenceman of the Year Award and was named to the WHL West and CHL First All-Star Teams. He was also named Prince George's most valuable player. Hamhuis left Prince George as the club's all-time leader in assists with 123 (he was later surpassed by Blake Robson on January 28, 2003).

On July 7, 2002, Hamhuis was signed by the Predators. He was a late cut from Nashville's roster for the 2002–03 season and was assigned within the club's system to the Milwaukee Admirals of the AHL on October 3. He received a three-game suspension early in the season for an infraction during a game against the Utah Grizzlies. He went on to record six goals and 27 points over 68 games in his professional rookie campaign with the Admirals.

=== Professional (2003–2020) ===
==== Nashville Predators (2003–2010) ====
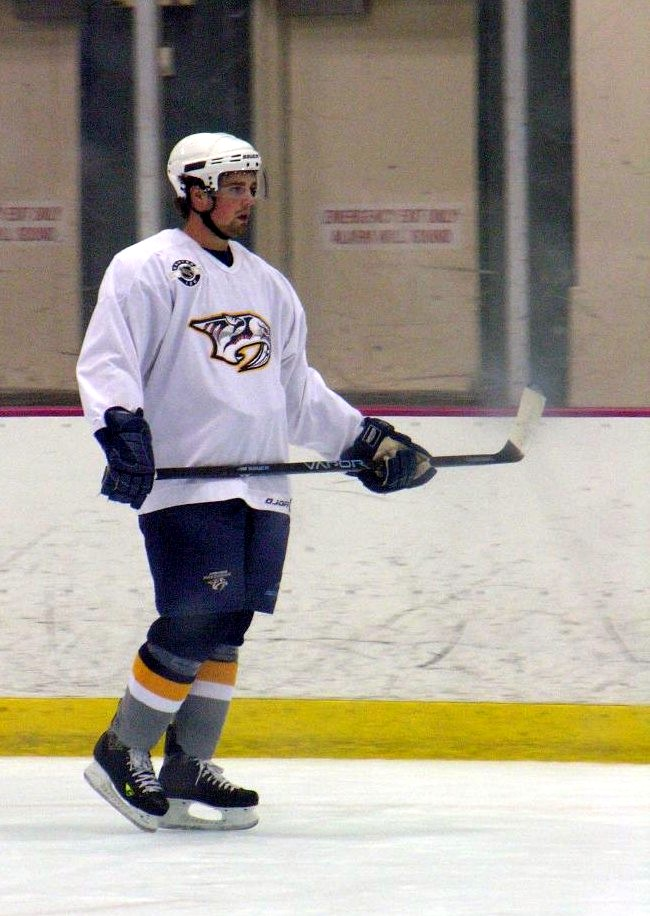
Hamhuis during a Predators practice in September 2005

Hamhuis transitioned to the NHL the following season by making the Predators' line-up out of training camp. He scored his first NHL goal on October 16, 2003, a game winner on the powerplay against St. Louis Blues goaltender Chris Osgood; Nashville won the game 4–1. Late in the campaign, he recorded a five-point night (one goal and four assists) in a 9–4 win against the Pittsburgh Penguins on March 4, 2004. He finished the season with seven goals and 26 points over 82 games with Predators in 2003–04. He ranked tied for third in point-scoring and second in average ice time among the NHL's rookie defencemen. Hamhuis was also chosen to the 2004 NHL YoungStars Game, representing the Western Conference in a 7–3 win. Hamhuis helped the Predators make the playoffs for the first time in franchise history in his rookie season and added two assists in the club's first-round elimination to the Detroit Red Wings.

Due to the season-long NHL lock-out, Hamhuis returned to the AHL in 2004–05. Notching 13 goals and 51 points in 76 games, he was named to the AHL Second All-Star Team. He was also chosen to participate in the 2005 AHL All-Star Game for the Canadian team. With the NHL set to resume in 2005–06, the Predators re-signed Hamhuis to a one-year contract on August 16, 2005. Returning to Nashville, he went on to record a career-high seven goals, 31 assists and 38 points in 82 games. He led all Predators players in ice time and ranked second in plus-minus with a +11 rating.

Following his break-out season, the Predators and Hamhuis agreed to a four-year, $8 million contract on September 21, 2006. He earned $1.5 million in his first year of the deal, gradually increasing to $2.5 million in his fourth. His offensive production dipped to a career-low 20 points in the season following the signing. In 2007–08, he recorded four goals and 27 points over 80 games. Hamhuis scored his first Stanley Cup playoff goal in game four of the opening round against the Detroit Red Wings, a 3–2 win. However, Nashville lost the next two games and were eliminated. Hamhuis continued scoring at the same pace in the following two seasons, recording 26 and 24 points in 2008–09 and 2009–10, respectively.

Hamhuis' role with the Predators was diminished in his final few seasons in Nashville with the emergence of younger defencemen Shea Weber and Ryan Suter as the club's top two defencemen. With Weber and Suter providing most of the offence from the blueline, Hamhuis was used primarily as a shutdown defenceman, matching up against opposing team's top forward units and leading the club in shorthanded ice time, while seeing limited powerplay time.

As it became apparent that Hamhuis would not be re-signed by the Predators following the 2009–10 season, his negotiating rights were traded to the Philadelphia Flyers, along with a 2011 conditional draft pick, for Ryan Parent on June 19, 2010. Hamhuis and the Predators had been negotiating for most of the season, as well as in the summer, but Nashville was not willing to meet his asking price. After failing to agree to a contract with Philadelphia as well, his rights were traded once again to the Pittsburgh Penguins for a 2011 third-round pick on June 25; negotiations with the club were also unsuccessful.

==== Vancouver Canucks (2010–2016) ====
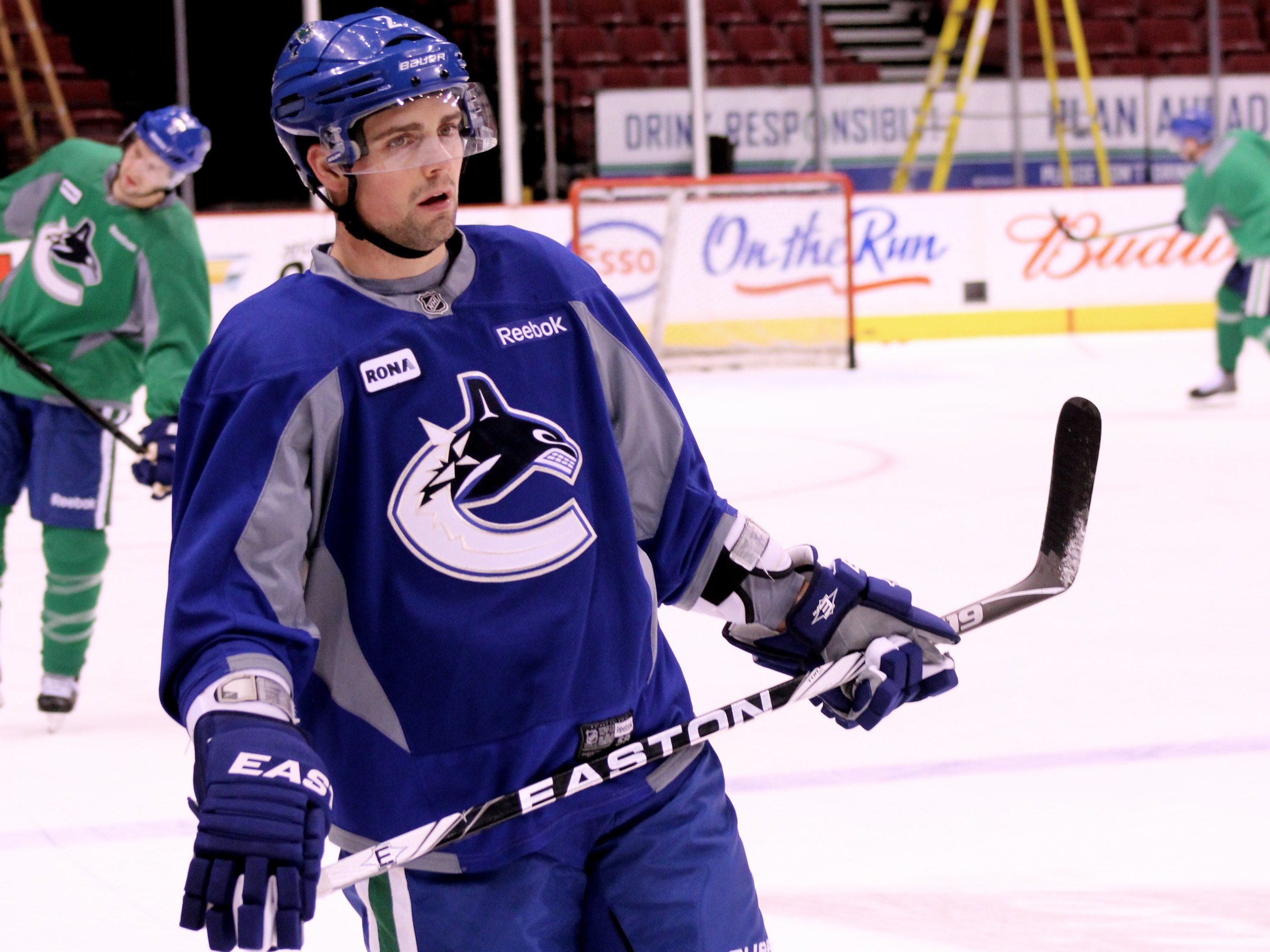
Hamhuis during a team practice with the Vancouver Canucks in March 2012

On July 1, 2010, Hamhuis became an unrestricted free agent and signed a six-year, $27 million contract with the Vancouver Canucks. Growing up in Smithers, British Columbia, he was specifically interested in signing with the Canucks during his pending free agency, which factored into his decision to sign with neither Philadelphia nor Pittsburgh. The Canucks had reportedly tried to acquire Hamhuis previously at the 2009–10 trade deadline, with Nashville asking for prospect Cody Hodgson and a first-round draft pick in exchange. Several days prior to his free agency, the Canucks traded for defenceman Keith Ballard from the Florida Panthers, which initially led Hamhuis to believe the Canucks would be no longer interested in him. However, on July 1, the Canucks were one of ten teams to offer him a contract and he signed with the club despite more lucrative deals of up to $5 million in salary and terms of seven years. Five games into the 2010–11 season, he suffered a bruised foot while blocking a shot during a contest against the Carolina Hurricanes on October 17, 2010. The injury caused him to miss eight games. After returning to the line-up, he scored his first goal as a Canuck – an empty-netter in the final minute of a 5–3 win against the Toronto Maple Leafs on November 13. Later in the season, Hamhuis suffered a concussion during a game against the Anaheim Ducks on February 9, 2011. After making a pass from behind his net, he received a bodycheck from opposing forward, Ducks captain Ryan Getzlaf, causing him to hit his head on the boards. He lay motionless on the ice for several minutes before being helped to the Canucks' dressing room. While no penalty was called on the play, Hamhuis' teammates described the hit as a dirty play on Getzlaf's part after the game. Conversely, Canucks head coach Alain Vigneault told media it was a "good hit by a big player" and that Hamhuis "was watching his pass and should have been trying to protect himself." Speaking publicly of the injury for the first time 10 days later, Hamhuis said he did not deem the hit "dirty", but "unnecessary", given the "puck was...off [his] stick" and he was in a "vulnerable position". After returning to the line-up, he registered his first two-goal NHL game, including the overtime-winner, in a 4–3 win against the Phoenix Coyotes. Finishing the season with six goals and 17 assists for 23 points in 64 games, he helped the Canucks to the best record in the NHL, earning them the franchise's first ever Presidents' Trophy. He ranked third on the team in plus-minus (+29) and average ice time per game (22 minutes and 40 seconds). Entering the 2011 playoffs, the Canucks eliminated the defending Stanley Cup champion Chicago Blackhawks in seven games, Nashville Predators in six games and San Jose Sharks in five games en route to the Stanley Cup Finals. On June 1, 2011, during Game 1 of the series against the Boston Bruins, Hamhuis suffered a sports hernia, as well as groin and lower abdomen injuries, resulting from a hip check he delivered to opposing forward Milan Lucic; he was sidelined for the remainder of the Final, which the Canucks would lose in seven games, one win short from winning the Stanley Cup and letting go of a 3–2 series lead in the process. Prior to his injury, Hamhuis played a significant role in the team's playoff run, forming a shutdown defensive pairing with rugged enforcer Kevin Bieksa. The two led Vancouver in average ice time per game throughout the playoffs. It was revealed following the Canucks' Game 7 defeat to the Bruins that Hamhuis required off-season surgery.

Playing in his second season with Vancouver, the Hamhuis recorded four goals and a career-high 33 assists for 37 points during the 2011–12 season, one short of his personal best from 2005–06 while playing for the Predators. He also led the Canucks in plus-minus with a +29 rating. His efforts helped Vancouver to a second consecutive Presidents' Trophy. Individually, he ranked 10th in Norris Trophy balloting with two second-place votes. In the 2012 playoffs, Hamhuis was held goalless and recorded three assists over all five games as the Canucks were upset by the eighth-seeded and eventual Stanley Cup champion Los Angeles Kings in the first round in five games.

Hamhuis recorded four goals and 20 assists for 24 points in 47 games in the lockout-shortened 2012–13 season as the Canucks finished third in the West before ultimately getting upset in a four-game sweep in the opening round of the 2013 playoffs against the sixth-seeded San Jose Sharks. In all four games played, Hamhuis recorded two points (a goal and an assist).

On October 6, 2013, Hamhuis recorded his 200th NHL assist in a 5–4 OT win over the Calgary Flames on a Dale Weise goal. He would maintain his durability as the season went on and ultimately ended the 2013–14 season five goals and 17 assists for 22 points in 79 games as the Canucks as a team failed to qualify for the playoffs for the first time since 2008 and first time with Hamhuis as a member of the team.

On November 20, 2014, he tore his groin during a game against the Anaheim Ducks, resulting in him missing 22 games. Hamhuis ended the 2014–15 season with a goal and 22 assists for 23 points in 59 games. Despite an injury-depleted season for Hamhuis individually, the Canucks as a team rebounded nicely as they returned to the playoffs although they would lose in the first round in six games to the Calgary Flames. Hamhuis was goalless and recorded one assist for one point in all six games during the 2015 playoff series against Calgary.

On December 9, 2015, during a match against the New York Rangers, his face was struck by a Dan Boyle slapshot, breaking his jaw and resulting in him missing 21 games. He ended the 2015–16 season, another injury-marred season, with three goals and 10 assists for 13 points in 58 games as the Canucks struggled heavily as a team, missing the playoffs for the second time in three seasons.

==== Dallas Stars (2016–2018) ====
On July 1, 2016, after not being resigned by the Canucks, Hamhuis signed a two-year, $7.5 million contract with the Dallas Stars.

In 159 games with the Stars, Hamhuis recorded 40 total points.

==== Return to Nashville (2018–2020) ====
On July 25, 2018, Hamhuis, as a free agent, signed a two-year, $2.5 million contract to return to the Nashville Predators, the team that originally drafted him in 2001.

In 57 games during the 2018-19 NHL season, Hamhuis recorded five assists. He had no points in six games of Nashville's first-round playoff series against his former team, the Dallas Stars who defeated the Predators to move on to Round 2.

On August 13, 2020, Hamhuis announced his retirement from the NHL after 16 seasons.

== International play ==
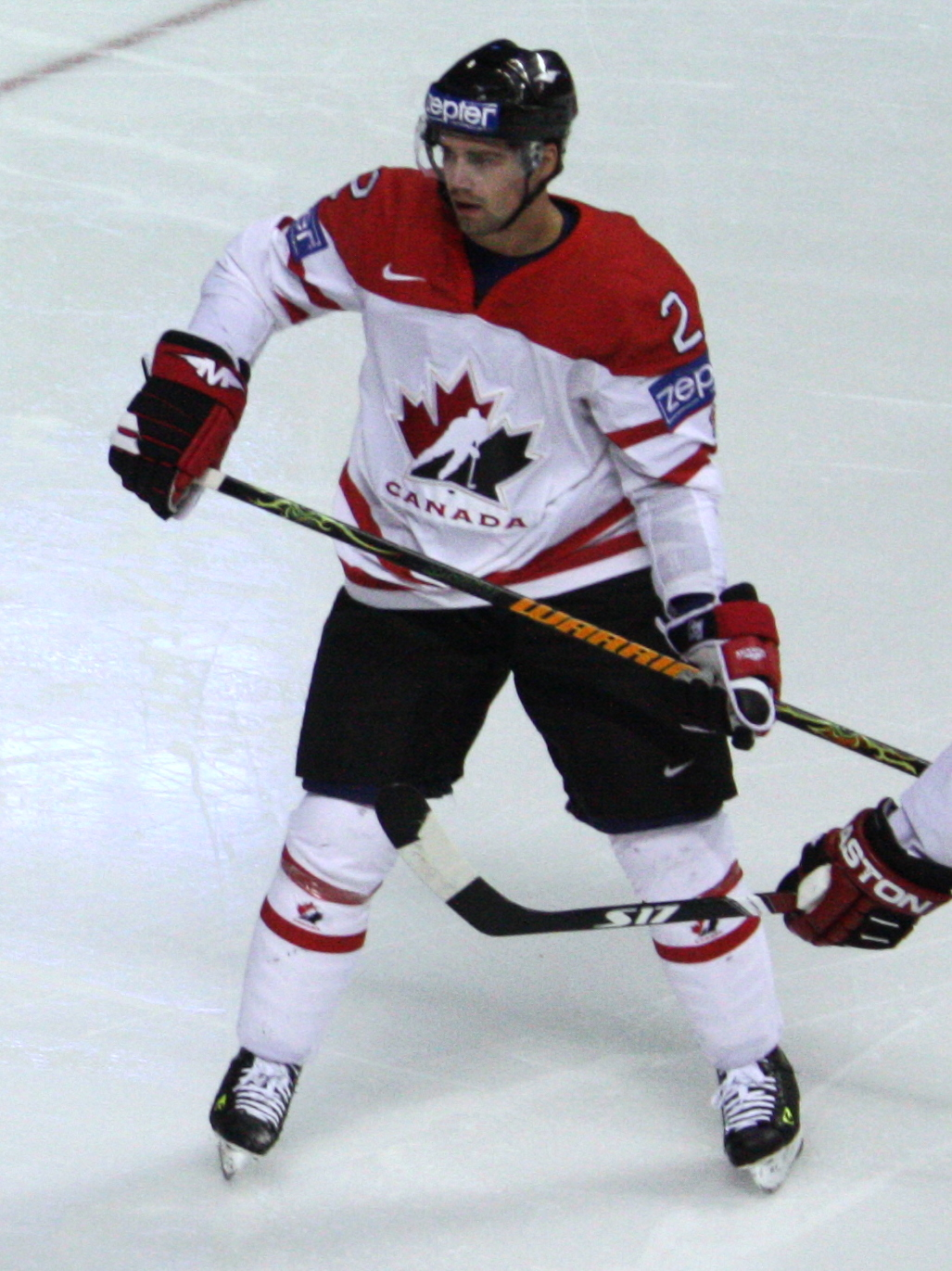
- Hamhuis during the 2008 IIHF World Championship

Medal record

Representing Canada

Ice hockey

Olympic Games
Gold medal – first place	2014 Sochi	

World Championships
Gold medal – first place	2007 Russia	
Gold medal – first place	2015 Czech Republic	
Silver medal – second place	2008 Canada	
Silver medal – second place	2009 Switzerland	

World Junior Championships
Silver medal – second place	2002 Czech Republic	
Bronze medal – third place	2001 Russia	

Hamhuis played for the Canadian national junior team at the 2001 and 2002 World Junior Championships. He won a bronze medal with Canada in his first year at the tournament in Moscow, Russia, contributing an assist in seven games. The following year in Pardubice, Czech Republic, he recorded three points in six games, tying with for Carlo Colaiacovo for the team lead in scoring among defencemen. He was sidelined during the tournament with an injured shoulder, sustained after being hit from behind into the boards in a game against Russia. He returned to help Canada to a silver medal, losing in the gold medal game to Russia 5–4.

Four years later, Hamhuis was named to the Canadian men's team for the 2006 World Championships in Riga, Latvia – his first of four consecutive tournament appearances. Making his senior international debut, he led all Canadian defencemen with five points in nine games. Canada was shut out in the bronze medal game by Finland 5–0.

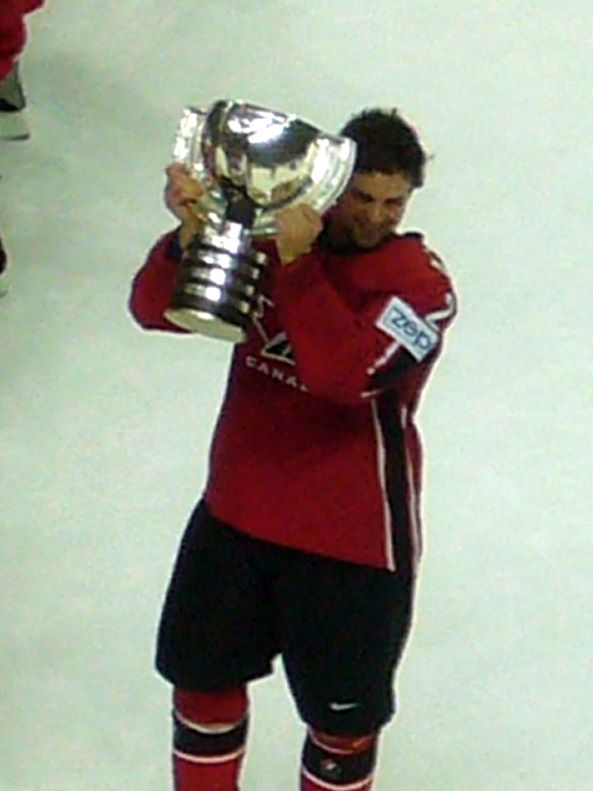
Hamhuis with the IIHF World Championship trophy in 2007

The following year, he was a late addition to Canada's roster on April 22, 2007, following the Predators' first-round playoff elimination. He was named to the team along with Predators teammate Shea Weber. Hamhuis went on to win his first international gold medal in a 4–2 final win against Finland in Moscow. He notched three points in nine games.

In 2008, Hamhuis and Canada made their second consecutive appearance in the gold medal game, but failed to defend their title in a 5–4 overtime loss to Russia. He ranked second behind Brent Burns on the team in average ice time with 17:47 minutes per game.

Canada faced Russia once again the following year in 2009, losing 2–1. Hamhuis scored four points in nine games while ranking second in average ice time among Canadian players, behind Nashville teammate Shea Weber.

Later that summer, Hamhuis was invited to Team Canada's 46-player orientation camp, held in Calgary for the 2010 Winter Olympics. He participated in the three-day camp in August 2009, but was not selected to the Olympic squad.

Following the Canucks' first-round elimination in the 2012 playoffs, Hamhuis was invited by Team Canada to that year's World Championships. With his third child on the way, however, he declined.

On January 7, 2014 Hamhuis was named to the Canadian Olympic team for the 2014 Sochi Olympic Winter Games. Team Canada won the gold medal beating Sweden 3-0.

== Personal life ==
Hamhuis was born and raised in Smithers, British Columbia, to parents Marty and Ida. He has two sisters, Erin and Cindy. His father and sisters also play hockey; Marty played senior hockey, while Erin and Cindy played in a local women's league. Hamhuis grew up in a Christian home with his family and has continued to profess this faith. Since joining the Canucks in 2010, he organized chapel services for his teammates to optionally attend.

Beginning to play organized hockey at the age of four, Hamhuis was competing against other players as old as eight years, as his hometown was not big enough to fill teams for younger age groups. He went to provincials four seasons in a row and won the title with his club, the Smithers Storm, in overtime during his last year of minor hockey. Future Predators teammate Cody Franson was a stick boy for Hamhuis' team, while another Nashville blueliner, Shea Weber, did the same for a competing team at provincial tournaments. Hamhuis grew up cheering for the Edmonton Oilers and Vancouver Canucks.

Hamhuis left home at the age of 15 to start playing junior with the Prince George Cougars. During his time there, he met his wife, Sarah. They have three daughters together.

Hamhuis is an owner of the Prince George Cougars franchise; he is part of the ownership group that also comprises fellow NHL player Eric Brewer and a team of local investors. The group's bid to purchase the team was approved by the WHL Board of Governors on April 30, 2014.

During his tenure with the Canucks, Hamhuis was also heavily involved with the team's community initiatives. Most significantly, he served as a spokesperson for the Canucks Autism Network, a non-profit organization that provides sports and recreation programs for individuals and families living with autism in British Columbia.

== Career statistics ==
=== Regular season and playoffs ===
			Regular season					Playoffs
Season	Team	League	GP	G	A	Pts	PIM	GP	G	A	Pts	PIM
1998–99	Prince George Cougars	WHL	56	1	3	4	45	7	1	2	3	8
1999–2000	Prince George Cougars	WHL	70	10	23	33	140	13	2	3	5	35
2000–01	Prince George Cougars	WHL	62	13	46	59	125	6	2	3	5	15
2001–02	Prince George Cougars	WHL	59	10	50	60	135	7	0	5	5	16
2002–03	Milwaukee Admirals	AHL	68	6	21	27	81	6	0	3	3	2
2003–04	Nashville Predators	NHL	80	7	19	26	57	6	0	2	2	6
2004–05	Milwaukee Admirals	AHL	76	13	38	51	85	7	0	2	2	10
2005–06	Nashville Predators	NHL	82	7	31	38	70	5	0	2	2	2
2006–07	Nashville Predators	NHL	81	6	14	20	66	5	0	1	1	2
2007–08	Nashville Predators	NHL	80	4	23	27	66	6	1	1	2	6
2008–09	Nashville Predators	NHL	82	3	23	26	67	—	—	—	—	—
2009–10	Nashville Predators	NHL	78	5	19	24	49	6	0	2	2	2
2010–11	Vancouver Canucks	NHL	64	6	17	23	34	19	1	5	6	6
2011–12	Vancouver Canucks	NHL	82	4	33	37	46	5	0	3	3	6
2012–13	Vancouver Canucks	NHL	47	4	20	24	12	4	1	1	2	8
2013–14	Vancouver Canucks	NHL	79	5	17	22	26	—	—	—	—	—
2014–15	Vancouver Canucks	NHL	59	1	22	23	44	6	0	1	1	16
2015–16	Vancouver Canucks	NHL	58	3	10	13	28	—	—	—	—	—
2016–17	Dallas Stars	NHL	79	1	15	16	23	—	—	—	—	—
2017–18	Dallas Stars	NHL	80	3	21	24	33	—	—	—	—	—
2018–19	Nashville Predators	NHL	57	0	5	5	28	6	0	0	0	0
2019–20	Nashville Predators	NHL	60	0	8	8	35	—	—	—	—	—
NHL totals			1,148	59	297	356	684	68	3	18	21	54

=== International ===
Year	Team	Event	Result	GP	G	A	Pts	PIM
2001	Canada	WJC	3rd place, bronze medalist(s)	7	0	1	1	8
2002	Canada	WJC	2nd place, silver medalist(s)	6	0	3	3	8
2006	Canada	WC	4th	9	1	4	5	10
2007	Canada	WC	1st place, gold medalist(s)	9	1	2	3	2
2008	Canada	WC	2nd place, silver medalist(s)	9	1	1	2	8
2009	Canada	WC	2nd place, silver medalist(s)	9	2	2	4	16
2013	Canada	WC	5th	3	0	1	1	2
2014	Canada	OG	1st place, gold medalist(s)	5	0	0	0	0
2015	Canada	WC	1st place, gold medalist(s)	10	0	6	6	8
Junior totals				13	0	4	4	16
Senior totals				52	5	16	21	44

== Awards ==
=== WHL and CHL ===
Award	Year
Prince George Cougars Rookie of the Year	1999
Prince George Cougars All-Scholastic Player	1999, 2000
Prince George Cougars Most Dedicated Player	2001
Prince George Cougars Most Valuable Player	2002
WHL West First All-Star Team	2001
Bill Hunter Memorial Trophy (WHL Defenceman of the Year)	2002
Four Broncos Memorial Trophy (WHL Player of the Year)	2002
WHL West First All-Star Team	2002
CHL Defenceman of the Year	2002
CHL First All-Star Team	2002

=== AHL ===
Award	Year
AHL Second All-Star Team	2005

Awards and achievements
Preceded by Scott Hartnell	Nashville Predators first-round draft pick 2001	Succeeded by Scottie Upshall
Preceded by Marc-André Bergeron	Winner of the CHL Defenceman of the Year; 2002	Succeeded by Brendan Bell
Preceded by Christian Chartier	Winner of the WHL Bill Hunter Memorial Trophy; 2002	Succeeded by Jeff Woywitka
Preceded by Justin Mapletoft	Winner of the WHL Four Broncos Memorial Trophy; 2002	Succeeded by Josh Harding
