= Ty Smith (ice hockey) =

Canadian ice hockey player

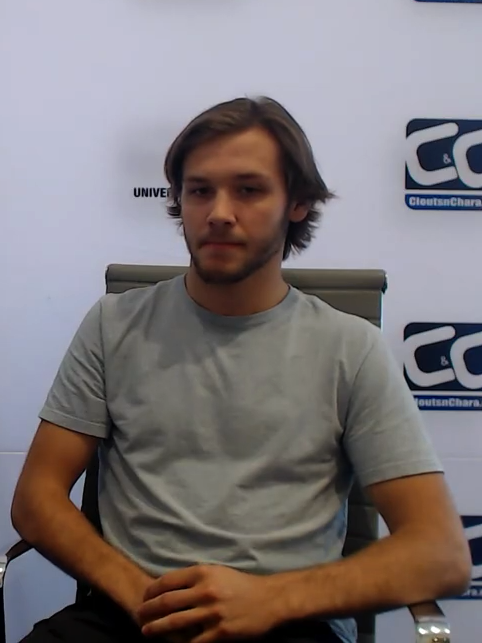
- Smith in 2019
- Born: March 24, 2000 (age 26) Lloydminster, Alberta, Canada
- Height: 5 ft 11 in (180 cm)
- Weight: 180 lb (82 kg; 12 st 12 lb)
- Position: Defence
- Shoots: Left
- KHL team Former teams: Dinamo Minsk; New Jersey Devils; Pittsburgh Penguins; Carolina Hurricanes
- NHL draft: 17th overall, 2018; New Jersey Devils
- Playing career: 2021–present

Ty Smith (born March 24, 2000) is a Canadian professional ice hockey defenceman who is currently playing under contract with HC Dinamo Minsk of the Kontinental Hockey League (KHL). He was drafted in the first round, 17th overall, in the 2018 NHL entry draft by the New Jersey Devils.

== Playing career ==
Smith was selected first overall by the Spokane Chiefs in the 2015 WHL Bantam Draft. In his rookie season with the Chiefs, Smith was named the team's Rookie of the Year and Scholastic Player of the Year. The following year, Smith had a breakout season setting a new franchise record for most points in a single game by a defenceman and being named the WHL Scholastic Player of the Year. Smith was also named the Chiefs Defenceman of the Year.

On August 20, 2018, Smith signed a three-year, entry-level contract with the New Jersey Devils, who had drafted him 17th overall in the 2018 NHL entry draft. Smith attended the Devils training camp but was reassigned to the Chiefs on September 28. On October 24, Smith was named co-captain of the Chiefs alongside Jaret Anderson-Dolan.

Smith made the Devils opening night roster for the 2020–21 season, making his debut on January 14, 2021, against the Boston Bruins and recording his first NHL goal in the Devils' 3–2 shootout loss. Smith would go on to record points in each of his first five NHL games, the second-longest streak ever for a rookie defenceman in the NHL behind only Marek Židlický. Smith continued his strong start to his rookie season, recording eight points in his first nine games before being placed on the COVID-19 reserve list on February 2, along with 13 of his Devils' teammates. After the season Smith was named to the NHL All-Rookie Team.

On July 16, 2022, Smith was traded by the Devils, along with a 2023 third-round pick to the Pittsburgh Penguins in exchange for defenceman John Marino. He split the 2022–23 season between the Penguins and their American Hockey League (AHL) affiliate, the Wilkes-Barre/Scranton Penguins.

Smith spent the entirety of the 2023–24 season in Wilkes-Barre. On March 7, 2024, Smith was traded to the Carolina Hurricanes, along with Jake Guentzel, in exchange for Michael Bunting, Ville Koivunen, prospect Cruz Lucius, Vasili Ponomaryov, and two conditional 2024 draft picks. He remained in Wilkes-Barre following the trade, recording 43 points in 63 games.

On June 21, 2024, the Hurricanes signed Smith to a one-year, two-way contract extension.

As a free agent at the conclusion of his contract with the Hurricanes, Smith left North America and was signed to a one-year contract with Belarusian club, HC Dinamo Minsk of the KHL, on July 17, 2025.

== International play ==
Medal record

Representing Canada

Ice hockey

World Junior Championships
Gold medal – first place	2020 Czech Republic	

Ivan Hlinka Memorial Tournament
Gold medal – first place	2017 Czech Republic/Slovakia	

Smith was named the captain of Team Canada at the 2016 Winter Youth Olympics. The following year, he was named an alternate captain for Team Canada at the 2017 Ivan Hlinka Memorial Tournament.

== Career statistics ==
=== Regular season and playoffs ===
			Regular season					Playoffs
Season	Team	League	GP	G	A	Pts	PIM	GP	G	A	Pts	PIM
2015–16	Lloydminster Bobcats	AMHL	28	9	14	23	10	10	1	8	9	0
2015–16	Spokane Chiefs	WHL	2	0	2	2	0	—	—	—	—	—
2016–17	Spokane Chiefs	WHL	66	5	27	32	22	—	—	—	—	—
2017–18	Spokane Chiefs	WHL	69	14	59	73	30	7	2	5	7	2
2018–19	Spokane Chiefs	WHL	57	7	62	69	33	15	1	8	9	6
2019–20	Spokane Chiefs	WHL	46	19	40	59	42	—	—	—	—	—
2020–21	New Jersey Devils	NHL	48	2	21	23	22	—	—	—	—	—
2021–22	New Jersey Devils	NHL	66	5	15	20	22	—	—	—	—	—
2022–23	Wilkes-Barre/Scranton Penguins	AHL	39	7	17	24	20	—	—	—	—	—
2022–23	Pittsburgh Penguins	NHL	9	1	3	4	4	—	—	—	—	—
2023–24	Wilkes-Barre/Scranton Penguins	AHL	63	9	34	43	36	—	—	—	—	—
2024–25	Chicago Wolves	AHL	36	5	23	28	35	2	0	1	1	0
2024–25	Carolina Hurricanes	NHL	8	1	1	2	4	—	—	—	—	—
2025–26	Dinamo Minsk	KHL	68	5	41	46	32	8	0	4	4	2
NHL totals			131	9	40	49	52	—	—	—	—	—
KHL totals			68	5	41	46	32	8	0	4	4	2

=== International ===
Year	Team	Event	Result	GP	G	A	Pts	PIM
2016	Canada Black	U17	2nd place, silver medalist(s)	6	2	2	4	2
2017	Canada	IH18	1st place, gold medalist(s)	5	0	3	3	0
2017	Canada	U18	5th	5	0	1	1	4
2018	Canada	U18	5th	5	0	0	0	4
2019	Canada	WJC	6th	5	0	3	3	0
2020	Canada	WJC	1st place, gold medalist(s)	7	0	3	3	2
Junior totals				33	2	12	14	12

== Awards and honours ==
Award	Year	Ref
AMHL
First All-Star Team	2016	
Top Defenceman	2016	
Telus Cup Top Defensive Player	2016	
WHL
West First All-Star Team	2018, 2019	
Daryl K. (Doc) Seaman Trophy	2018	
Bill Hunter Memorial Trophy	2019, 2020	
CHL Defenceman of the Year	2019	
NHL
All-Rookie Team	2021	

Awards and achievements
Preceded by Nico Hischier	New Jersey Devils first-round draft pick 2018	Succeeded by Jack Hughes
