= Zayne Parekh =

Canadian ice hockey player (born 2006)

- Born: February 15, 2006 (age 20) Nobleton, Ontario, Canada
- Height: 6 ft 0 in (183 cm)
- Weight: 179 lb (81 kg; 12 st 11 lb)
- Position: Defence
- Shoots: Right
- NHL team: Calgary Flames
- NHL draft: 9th overall, 2024; Calgary Flames
- Playing career: 2025–present

Zayne Parekh (born February 15, 2006) is a Canadian professional ice hockey defenceman for the Calgary Flames of the National Hockey League (NHL). He was selected ninth overall by the Flames in the 2024 NHL entry draft.

== Playing career ==
While playing AAA hockey for the Markham Majors in the Greater Toronto Hockey League, Parekh was selected 19th overall in the 2022 Ontario Hockey League (OHL) draft by the Saginaw Spirit. He signed with the Spirit on May 19 and made his OHL debut on October 1, in a 10–6 victory over the Guelph Storm.

In his first full OHL season in 2022–23, Parekh recorded 21 goals and 37 points across 50 games, breaking the record for most goals by a 16-year-old defenceman. He was named to the CHL All-Rookie Team and the OHL First All-Rookie Team.

The 2023–24 season saw Parekh continue as a prolific scorer and attract considerable notice from commentators and scouts. On January 20, 2024, Parekh tied the Saginaw Spirit club record set by Patrick McNeill for most goals by a defenseman in a single season, and not long after was selected as one of 40 draft-eligible prospects to attend the 2024 CHL/NHL Top Prospects Game. He was suspended for two games following an incident after a stoppage in play during a game against the Windsor Spitfires on January 21, 2024. He finished the season with 33 goals and 96 points, becoming only the second defenceman in league history to score at least thirty goals in their first season of NHL draft eligibility.

Following the season, he received the Max Kaminsky Trophy as OHL defenceman of the year, and finished second in voting for the Red Tilson Trophy as the OHL's most valuable player, behind Easton Cowan. As well, he was named to the First All-Star Team. Parekh was ultimately given the CHL Defenceman of the Year Award as the best defenceman of the three CHL component leagues, and named to the CHL First All-Star Team. In the postseason, Parekh was a key figure in the Spirit's deep playoff run, but injury caused him to miss the opening game of the team's Western Conference Final series against the London Knights. He returned thereafter, but The Hockey News opined that he remained "a little banged up" and did not perform to his former standard. The Knights ultimately defeated the Spirit in six games.

Entering the 2024 NHL entry draft, Parekh's strengths such as his skating, strong shot, and puckhandling were applauded, while concerns were raised about his decision making and positioning, drawing comparisons to Erik Karlsson and Quinn Hughes. He was drafted ninth overall by the Calgary Flames, and signed a three-year entry-level contract with the team on July 5, 2024. In the 2024–25 season with the Spirit, Parekh recorded 33 goals and 74 assists. He received his second consecutive First All-Star Team designations from both the OHL and the CHL. Following Saginaw's elimination from the OHL playoffs, he was called up by the Flames. In Calgary's final game of the 2024–25 season on April 17, Parekh made his professional debut, scoring a goal in a 5–1 victory over the Los Angeles Kings.

== International play ==
Medal record

Representing Canada

Men's ice hockey

World Junior Championships
Bronze medal – third place	2026 United States	

Hlinka Gretzky Cup
Gold medal – first place	2023 Czechia/Slovakia	

Parekh represented Canada at the 2023 Hlinka Gretzky Cup, recording three assists in five games to help claim a gold medal.

In December 2025, he was selected to represent Canada at the 2026 World Junior Ice Hockey Championships. During the tournament he recorded five goals and eight assists in seven games and won a bronze medal.

== Personal life ==
Parekh is of Indian and South Korean heritage and the youngest of three hockey-playing brothers. He graduated high school at 15 years old, after which he took classes at the University of Toronto.

== Career statistics ==
=== Regular season and playoffs ===
			Regular season					Playoffs
Season	Team	League	GP	G	A	Pts	PIM	GP	G	A	Pts	PIM
2021–22	North York Rangers	OJHL	2	0	0	0	0	1	0	0	0	2
2022–23	Saginaw Spirit	OHL	50	21	16	37	32	11	6	3	9	14
2023–24	Saginaw Spirit	OHL	66	33	63	96	64	13	2	9	11	12
2024–25	Saginaw Spirit	OHL	61	33	74	107	96	5	2	7	9	14
2024–25	Calgary Flames	NHL	1	1	0	1	2	—	—	—	—	—
2025–26	Calgary Flames	NHL	37	4	5	9	8	—	—	—	—	—
2025–26	Calgary Wranglers	AHL	4	2	3	5	2	—	—	—	—	—
NHL totals			38	5	5	10	10	—	—	—	—	—

=== International ===
Year	Team	Event	Result	GP	G	A	Pts	PIM
2023	Canada	HG18	1st place, gold medalist(s)	5	0	3	3	0
2026	Canada	WJC	3rd place, bronze medalist(s)	7	5	8	13	10
Junior totals				12	5	11	16	10

== Awards and honours ==
Award	Year	Ref
CHL
All-Rookie Team	2023	
CHL Defenceman of the Year	2024	
First All-Star Team	2024, 2025	
Memorial Cup champion	2024	
OHL
First All-Rookie Team	2023	
Max Kaminsky Trophy	2024	
First All-Star Team	2024, 2025	

== See also ==
- List of Indian NHL players

Awards and achievements
Preceded by Samuel Honzek	Calgary Flames first-round draft pick 2024	Succeeded by Matvei Gridin
