= CHL Defenceman of the Year =

Canadian Hockey League award

CHL Defenceman of the Year Award
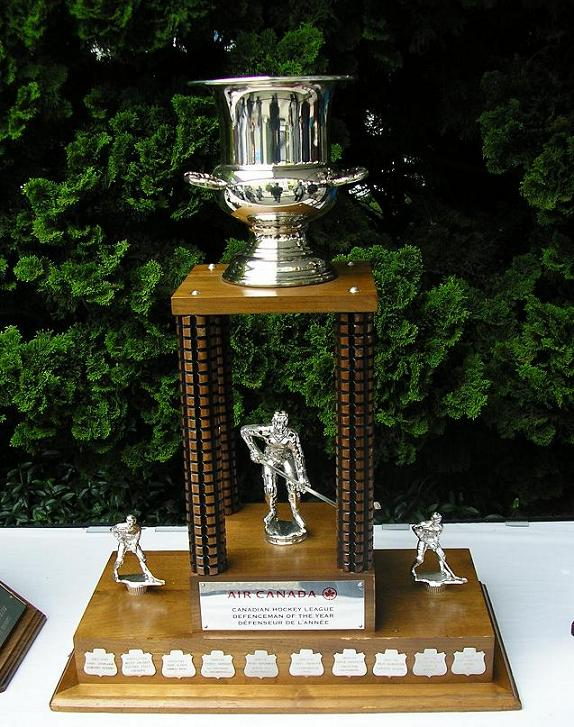
- Sport: Ice hockey
- Awarded for: Annually to the top defenceman in the Canadian Hockey League

History
- First award: 1988
- First winner: Greg Hawgood
- Most recent: Bryce Pickford

The CHL Defenceman of the Year Award is given out annually to the top defenceman in the Canadian Hockey League. It is chosen from the winners of the league trophies, the Max Kaminsky Trophy of the Ontario Hockey League, the Bill Hunter Memorial Trophy of the Western Hockey League, and the Emile Bouchard Trophy of the Quebec Maritimes Junior Hockey League.

== Winners ==
List of winners of the CHL Defenceman of the Year Award.

Season	Winner	Team	League
1987–88	Greg Hawgood	Kamloops Blazers	WHL
1988–89	Bryan Fogarty	Niagara Falls Thunder	OHL
1989–90	John Slaney	Cornwall Royals	OHL
1990–91	Patrice Brisebois	Drummondville Voltigeurs	QMJHL
1991–92	Drake Berehowsky	North Bay Centennials	OHL
1992–93	Chris Pronger	Peterborough Petes	OHL
1993–94	Steve Gosselin	Chicoutimi Saguenéens	QMJHL
1994–95	Nolan Baumgartner	Kamloops Blazers	WHL
1995–96	Bryan Berard	Detroit Junior Red Wings	OHL
1996–97	Sean Blanchard	Ottawa 67's	OHL
1997–98	Derrick Walser	Rimouski Océanic	QMJHL
1998–99	Brad Stuart	Calgary Hitmen	WHL
1999–2000	Micki Dupont	Kamloops Blazers	WHL
2000–01	Marc-Andre Bergeron	Shawinigan Cataractes	QMJHL
2001–02	Dan Hamhuis	Prince George Cougars	WHL
2002–03	Brendan Bell	Ottawa 67's	OHL
2003–04	James Wisniewski	Plymouth Whalers	OHL
2004–05	Danny Syvret	London Knights	OHL
2005–06	Keith Yandle	Moncton Wildcats	QMJHL
2006–07	Kris Russell	Medicine Hat Tigers	WHL
2007–08	Karl Alzner	Calgary Hitmen	WHL
2008–09	Jonathon Blum	Vancouver Giants	WHL
2009–10	David Savard	Moncton Wildcats	QMJHL
2010–11	Ryan Ellis	Windsor Spitfires	OHL
2011–12	Dougie Hamilton	Niagara IceDogs	OHL
2012–13	Ryan Sproul	Sault Ste. Marie Greyhounds	OHL
2013–14	Derrick Pouliot	Portland Winterhawks	WHL
2014–15	Tony DeAngelo	Sarnia Sting/Sault Ste. Marie Greyhounds	OHL
2015–16	Ivan Provorov	Brandon Wheat Kings	WHL
2016–17	Thomas Chabot	Saint John Sea Dogs	QMJHL
2017–18	Nicolas Hague	Mississauga Steelheads	OHL
2018–19	Ty Smith	Spokane Chiefs	WHL
2019–20	Noel Hoefenmayer	Ottawa 67's	OHL
2020–21	Not awarded due to COVID-19 pandemic		
2021–22	Nathan Staios	Hamilton Bulldogs	OHL
2022–23	Olen Zellweger	Kamloops Blazers	WHL
2023–24	Zayne Parekh	Saginaw Spirit	OHL
2024–25	Sam Dickinson	London Knights	OHL
2025–26	Bryce Pickford	Medicine Hat Tigers	WHL

== See also ==
- List of Canadian Hockey League awards
