= Micki DuPont =

Canadian ice hockey player

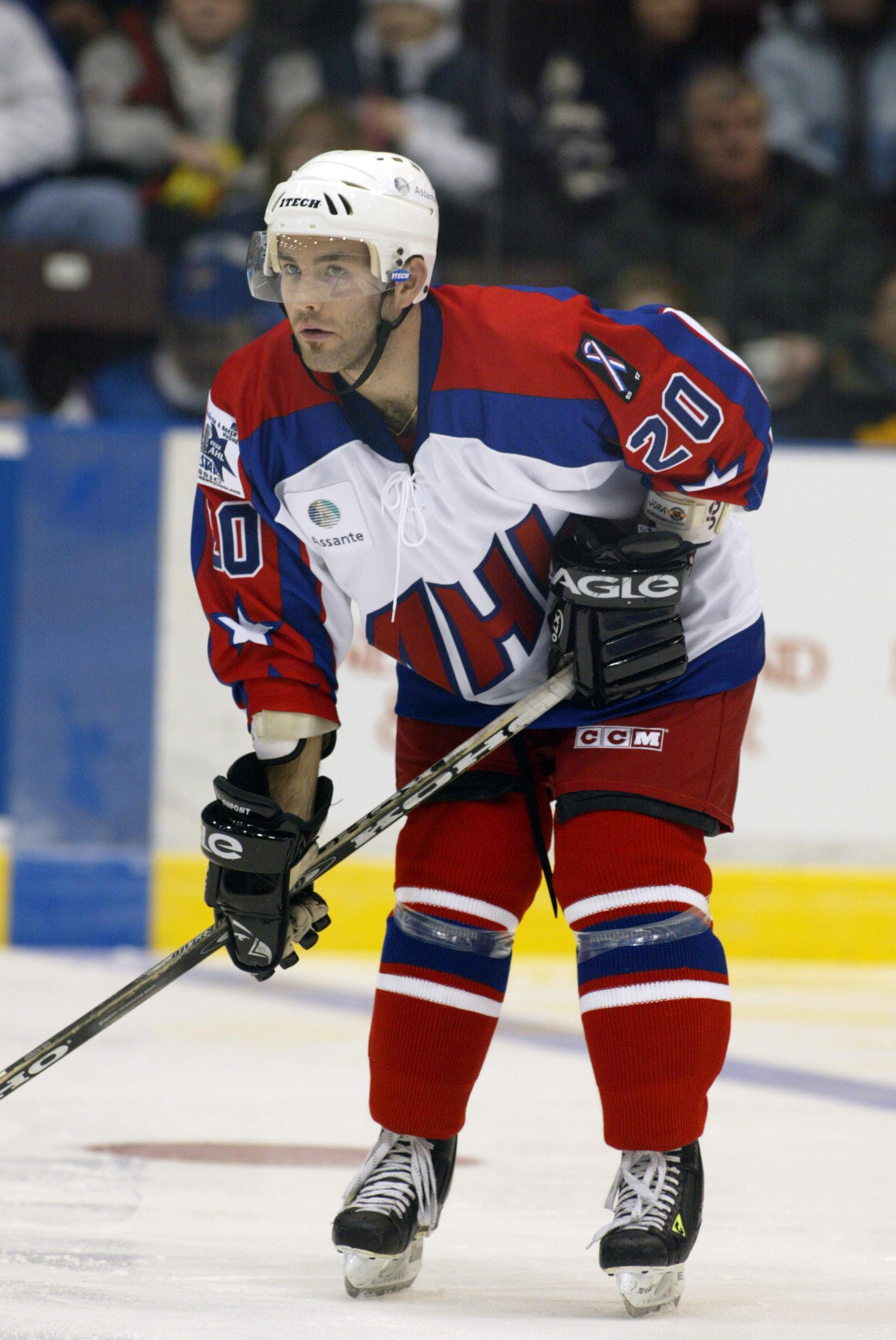
- Born: April 15, 1980 (age 46) Calgary, Alberta, Canada
- Height: 5 ft 10 in (178 cm)
- Weight: 186 lb (84 kg; 13 st 4 lb)
- Position: Defence
- Shot: Right
- Played for: Calgary Flames; Eisbären Berlin; Pittsburgh Penguins; St. Louis Blues; EV Zug; Kloten Flyers
- National team: Canada
- NHL draft: 270th overall, 2000; Calgary Flames
- Playing career: 2000–2019

Micki DuPont (born April 15, 1980) is a Canadian former professional ice hockey defenceman who last played for Eisbären Berlin in the Deutsche Eishockey Liga (DEL).

== Playing career ==
Normally playing as a defenceman, DuPont was drafted 270th overall in the ninth round by the Calgary Flames in the 2000 NHL entry draft. In his first season in the AHL, Dupont was named the Saint John Flames Rookie of the Year, named to the AHL All-Rookie Team after leading the Flames and all AHL rookies in plus/minus at +28, finishing second among all AHL players and played a key role on Saint-John's blue line en route to their first AHL Calder Cup Championship.

He was traded to the Pittsburgh Penguins on March 11, 2003 after playing two seasons with the Flames, but did not play for the Penguins before he moved to the Deutsche Eishockey Liga to play with Eisbären Berlin, and was part of the team which won the 2003–04 DEL Championship. He remained with Berlin for the 2005–06 season, during which he played 52 regular season games and won his second DEL Championship. DuPont was also named to the Canadian squad for the 2006 Men's World Ice Hockey Championships. He played 78 games for the Wilkes-Barre/Scranton Penguins of the AHL in the 2006–07 season before being recalled by Pittsburgh on December 4, 2006.

DuPont was signed by the St. Louis Blues on July 3, 2007. DuPont played the 2008–09 and 2009–10 seasons in Zug, Switzerland for the EV Zug where he led the NLA in most goals for a defenceman in 2009. In November 2009 it was announced, that DuPont signed a contract with the Kloten Flyers for three years, starting in the 2010–11 season. In 2010–11 and 2011–12, DuPont led the league in most points by a defenceman, with a consistent 41 points in 49 games both seasons.

After five seasons with the Kloten Flyers of the NLA, DuPont agreed to return to Eisbären Berlin of the DEL on May 7, 2015.

== Personal life ==
DuPont's son Landon received exceptional player status in the Western Hockey League (WHL).

== Career statistics ==
=== Regular season and playoffs ===
			Regular season					Playoffs
Season	Team	League	GP	G	A	Pts	PIM	GP	G	A	Pts	PIM
1996–97	Kamloops Blazers	WHL	59	8	27	35	39	5	0	4	4	8
1997–98	Kamloops Blazers	WHL	71	13	41	54	93	7	0	1	1	10
1998–99	Kamloops Blazers	WHL	59	8	27	35	110	15	2	8	10	22
1999–2000	Kamloops Blazers	WHL	70	26	62	88	156	4	0	2	2	17
1999–2000	Long Beach Ice Dogs	IHL	1	0	0	0	0	—	—	—	—	—
1999–2000	San Diego Gulls	WCHL	—	—	—	—	—	7	2	2	4	0
2000–01	Saint John Flames	AHL	67	8	21	29	28	19	1	9	10	14
2001–02	Saint John Flames	AHL	77	7	33	40	77	—	—	—	—	—
2001–02	Calgary Flames	NHL	2	0	0	0	2	—	—	—	—	—
2002–03	Calgary Flames	NHL	16	1	2	3	4	—	—	—	—	—
2002–03	Saint John Flames	AHL	44	12	21	33	73	—	—	—	—	—
2002–03	Wilkes–Barre/Scranton Penguins	AHL	14	1	4	5	16	6	3	0	3	21
2003–04	Eisbären Berlin	DEL	45	10	22	32	76	10	3	6	9	35
2004–05	Eisbären Berlin	DEL	51	11	22	33	93	11	2	5	7	41
2005–06	Eisbären Berlin	DEL	52	11	21	32	78	11	4	10	14	10
2006–07	Wilkes–Barre/Scranton Penguins	AHL	78	18	33	51	101	11	5	9	14	16
2006–07	Pittsburgh Penguins	NHL	3	0	1	1	4	—	—	—	—	—
2007–08	Peoria Rivermen	AHL	76	10	36	46	77	—	—	—	—	—
2007–08	St. Louis Blues	NHL	2	0	0	0	2	—	—	—	—	—
2008–09	EV Zug	NLA	50	13	19	32	58	10	2	3	5	4
2009–10	EV Zug	NLA	46	7	18	25	48	11	1	6	7	14
2010–11	Kloten Flyers	NLA	49	11	30	41	32	7	1	3	4	4
2011–12	Kloten Flyers	NLA	49	6	35	41	87	5	1	0	1	0
2012–13	Kloten Flyers	NLA	49	7	19	26	16	—	—	—	—	—
2013–14	Kloten Flyers	NLA	48	7	22	29	66	16	1	4	5	12
2014–15	Kloten Flyers	NLA	48	2	21	23	26	—	—	—	—	—
2015–16	Eisbären Berlin	DEL	52	10	22	32	48	7	1	3	4	8
2016–17	Eisbären Berlin	DEL	45	9	20	29	36	13	0	5	5	12
2017–18	Eisbären Berlin	DEL	52	7	16	23	42	18	1	7	8	10
2018–19	Eisbären Berlin	DEL	52	5	23	28	32	8	0	8	8	8
AHL totals			356	56	148	204	372	36	9	18	27	51
DEL totals			349	63	146	209	405	81	11	44	55	124
NLA totals			339	53	164	217	333	49	8	16	24	36
NHL totals			23	1	3	4	12

=== International ===
Medal record

Men's ice hockey

Representing Canada

Spengler Cup
Gold medal – first place	2012 Davos	

Year	Team	Event	Result	GP	G	A	Pts	PIM
2006	Canada	WC	4th	9	0	1	1	4
Senior totals				9	0	1	1	4

== Awards and honours ==
Award	Year
WHL
West First All-Star Team	2000
Bill Hunter Trophy	2000
CHL Defenceman of the Year	2000
AHL
All-Rookie Team	2001
Calder Cup (Saint John Flames)	2001
All-Star Game	2002, 2008
First All-Star Team	2007
DEL
All-Star Game	2005
Champion (Eisbären Berlin)	2005, 2006

Awards and achievements
Preceded by Alain Nasreddine	Captain of the Wilkes-Barre/Scranton Penguins; 2006–07	Succeeded by Nathan Smith
