= Brad Leeb =

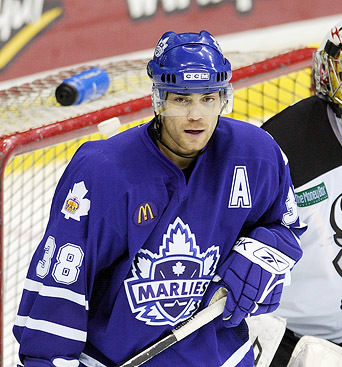
- Leeb with the Toronto Marlies in 2006
- Born: August 27, 1979 (age 47) Red Deer, Alberta, Canada
- Height: 5 ft 11 in (180 cm)
- Weight: 194 lb (88 kg; 13 st 12 lb)
- Position: Right Wing
- Shot: Right
- Played for: Toronto Maple Leafs; Vancouver Canucks; ERC Ingolstadt; Thomas Sabo Ice Tigers; Coventry Blaze
- NHL draft: Undrafted
- Playing career: 1999–2013

Bradley Leeb (born August 27, 1979) is a Cree former professional ice hockey player. He played 5 games in the NHL for the Vancouver Canucks and Toronto Maple Leafs and spent the bulk of his professional career in the minor American Hockey League, as well as several years playing in Germany and the United Kingdom, before retiring in 2013.

== Career ==
Leeb started his career playing for the Red Deer Midget Chiefs in the Alberta Midget Hockey League. He played 3 games for his hometown Red Deer Rebels as a 15-year-old, then went on to play 4 full seasons with the Rebels. He also played in the 1998–1999 WHL All-Star game.

Leeb played for Team Canada at the 1999 World Junior Ice Hockey Championships in Winnipeg, Manitoba. Canada won silver after losing to the Russians in triple overtime. Leeb finished tied for second in team scoring with Simon Gagne, Kyle Calder, and Brendan Morrow, all had 8 points in 7 games.

In 1999–2000, Leeb signed with the Vancouver Canucks as a free agent. He was with the Canucks organization for three seasons, appearing in 4 games with the Canucks while playing in the minor league system with the (Syracuse Crunch (AHL), Kansas City Blades) (IHL), and Manitoba Moose (AHL).

In 2002–03, Leeb was traded to the Toronto Maple Leafs for Tomas Mojzis. Leeb played one game for the Maple Leafs and mainly played in the Maple Leafs minor league system with the St. John's Maple Leafs (AHL) and the Toronto Marlies (AHL).

Leeb played the 2007–08 season in Germany for ERC Ingolstadt in the Deutsche Eishockey Liga (DEL).

In 2008–2009, he went to play for the Thomas Sabo Ice Tigers (DEL) in the city of Nuremberg, Germany.

Leeb played in Nuremberg on the same team as his older brother Greg Leeb for 4 seasons, from 2008–2012. It was the first time the brothers had ever played on the same team. Growing up they played against each other in the WHL, IHL, AHL, and the DEL.

Leeb was the creator of the website Betonhockey.com, a website that allowed betting on hockey games. He no longer owns the website.

On July 17, 2012, it was announced that Leeb had signed with the Coventry Blaze for the 2012–13 Elite League season, following his brother who signed earlier in the month.

On 8 April 2013, Leeb announced his retirement.

Leeb holds a master's degree in Sports Management from Coventry University.

== Career statistics ==
=== Regular season and playoffs ===
| | | | Regular season | | | | | Playoffs |
| Season | Team | League | GP | G | A | Pts | PIM | GP | G | A | Pts | PIM |
|---|---|---|---|---|---|---|---|---|---|---|---|---|
| 1993–94 | Red Deer Rebels Bantam AAA | AMBHL | 32 | 18 | 27 | 45 | 32 | — | — | — | — | — |
| 1994–95 | Red Deer Vipers | AMHL | 36 | 31 | 14 | 45 | 93 | — | — | — | — | — |
| 1994–95 | Red Deer Rebels | WHL | 3 | 0 | 0 | 0 | 4 | — | — | — | — | — |
| 1995–96 | Red Deer Rebels | WHL | 38 | 3 | 6 | 9 | 30 | 10 | 2 | 0 | 2 | 11 |
| 1996–97 | Red Deer Rebels | WHL | 70 | 15 | 20 | 35 | 76 | 16 | 3 | 3 | 6 | 6 |
| 1997–98 | Red Deer Rebels | WHL | 63 | 23 | 23 | 46 | 88 | 3 | 2 | 0 | 2 | 2 |
| 1998–99 | Red Deer Rebels | WHL | 64 | 32 | 47 | 79 | 84 | 9 | 5 | 9 | 14 | 10 |
| 1999–00 | Syracuse Crunch | AHL | 61 | 19 | 18 | 37 | 50 | 4 | 0 | 0 | 0 | 6 |
| 1999–00 | Vancouver Canucks | NHL | 2 | 0 | 0 | 0 | 2 | — | — | — | — | — |
| 2000–01 | Kansas City Blades | IHL | 53 | 18 | 16 | 34 | 53 | — | — | — | — | — |
| 2001–02 | Manitoba Moose | AHL | 60 | 17 | 15 | 32 | 45 | — | — | — | — | — |
| 2001–02 | Vancouver Canucks | NHL | 2 | 0 | 0 | 0 | 0 | — | — | — | — | — |
| 2002–03 | St. John's Maple Leafs | AHL | 79 | 35 | 26 | 61 | 78 | — | — | — | — | — |
| 2003–04 | St. John's Maple Leafs | AHL | 77 | 24 | 25 | 49 | 116 | — | — | — | — | — |
| 2003–04 | Toronto Maple Leafs | NHL | 1 | 0 | 0 | 0 | 0 | — | — | — | — | — |
| 2004–05 | St. John's Maple Leafs | AHL | 48 | 16 | 13 | 29 | 43 | 3 | 2 | 1 | 3 | 0 |
| 2005–06 | Toronto Marlies | AHL | 79 | 34 | 24 | 58 | 91 | 5 | 3 | 0 | 3 | 6 |
| 2006–07 | Toronto Marlies | AHL | 34 | 9 | 6 | 15 | 25 | — | — | — | — | — |
| 2007–08 | ERC Ingolstadt | DEL | 55 | 18 | 21 | 39 | 68 | 3 | 0 | 0 | 0 | 2 |
| 2008–09 | Sinupret Ice Tigers | DEL | 50 | 16 | 8 | 24 | 88 | 5 | 1 | 0 | 1 | 10 |
| 2009–10 | Thomas Sabo Ice Tigers | DEL | 56 | 20 | 21 | 41 | 80 | 5 | 3 | 2 | 5 | 2 |
| 2010–11 | Thomas Sabo Ice Tigers | DEL | 50 | 13 | 19 | 32 | 42 | 2 | 0 | 0 | 0 | 2 |
| 2011–12 | Thomas Sabo Ice Tigers | DEL | 44 | 3 | 6 | 9 | 40 | — | — | — | — | — |
| 2012–13 | Coventry Blaze | EIHL | 57 | 24 | 26 | 50 | 112 | — | — | — | — | — |
| AHL totals | | | 438 | 154 | 127 | 281 | 448 | 12 | 5 | 1 | 6 | 12 |
| NHL totals | | | 5 | 0 | 0 | 0 | 2 | — | — | — | — | — |

=== International ===
| Year | Team | Event | GP | G | A | Pts | PIM |
|---|---|---|---|---|---|---|---|
| 1999 | Canada | WJC | 7 | 3 | 5 | 8 | 2 |
| Junior totals | | | 7 | 3 | 5 | 8 | 2 |

== Awards and achievements ==
- Named to the WHL East Second All-Star Team in 1999
