= Joey Tetarenko =

- Born: March 3, 1978 (age 48) Prince Albert, Saskatchewan, Canada
- Height: 6 ft 2 in (188 cm)
- Weight: 230 lb (104 kg; 16 st 6 lb)
- Position: Right wing
- Shot: Right
- Played for: Florida Panthers; Ottawa Senators; Carolina Hurricanes
- NHL draft: 82nd overall, 1996; Florida Panthers
- Playing career: 1998–2007

Joey Tetarenko (born March 3, 1978) is a Canadian Métis former professional ice hockey player who played in the National Hockey League (NHL).

== Playing career ==
Born in Prince Albert, Saskatchewan and growing up in St. Louis, Saskatchewan, Tetarenko was drafted by the Florida Panthers 82nd overall in the 1996 NHL entry draft. He was drafted #10th overall in the 1st round of the 1993 WHL Bantam Draft by the Portland Winter Hawks of the Western Hockey League. He spent 4 seasons(1994–1998) playing junior hockey for the Portland Winter Hawks while in high school. His fourth and final season in Portland was the 1997-98 campaign where Joey was assigned team Captain and helped lead the team to win the 1998 Memorial Cup Championship. He made his National Hockey League debut for the Panthers during the 2000–01 NHL season and went on to play 69 games over three seasons before he was traded to the Ottawa Senators for Simon Lajeunesse. After appearing in only two games with Ottawa in 2003 he signed with the Carolina Hurricanes, spending much of his tenure with their American Hockey League affiliate the Lowell Lock Monsters.

Tetarenko signed with the Minnesota Wild in 2004, but never played for the team, instead spending three seasons in the AHL with the Houston Aeros. Tetarenko retired after the 2006–07 season with the Aeros.

Tetarenko was an assistant coach for the Dallas Oilers, and head coach of Bishop Lynch Varsity High School Hockey program in Dallas, Texas, in 2012–13, and now resides in Milton, Ontario. He now works for ProSharp, a skate blade company based in Sweden.

== Personal life ==
Tetarenko's son, Lochlan, joined the Portland Winterhawks, Joey's former Junior club, on January 9th, 2025, following a trade with the Saskatoon Blades.

== Career statistics ==
			Regular season					Playoffs
Season	Team	League	GP	G	A	Pts	PIM	GP	G	A	Pts	PIM
1993–94	North Battleford North Stars	SJHL	36	6	13	19	75	—	—	—	—	—
1994–95	Portland Winter Hawks	WHL	59	0	1	1	134	9	0	0	0	8
1995–96	Portland Winter Hawks	WHL	71	4	11	15	190	7	0	1	1	16
1996–97	Portland Winter Hawks	WHL	68	8	18	26	182	2	0	0	0	2
1997–98	Portland Winter Hawks	WHL	49	2	12	14	148	16	0	2	2	30
1998–99	Beast of New Haven	AHL	65	4	10	14	154	—	—	—	—	—
1999–00	Louisville Panthers	AHL	57	3	11	14	136	4	0	0	0	2
2000–01	Florida Panthers	NHL	29	3	1	4	44	—	—	—	—	—
2000–01	Louisville Panthers	AHL	29	1	4	5	74	—	—	—	—	—
2001–02	Florida Panthers	NHL	38	1	0	1	123	—	—	—	—	—
2002–03	Florida Panthers	NHL	2	0	0	0	4	—	—	—	—	—
2002–03	San Antonio Rampage	AHL	50	4	12	16	123	—	—	—	—	—
2002–03	Ottawa Senators	NHL	2	0	0	0	5	—	—	—	—	—
2002–03	Binghamton Senators	AHL	14	2	2	4	33	14	0	0	0	36
2003–04	Carolina Hurricanes	NHL	2	0	0	0	0	—	—	—	—	—
2003–04	Lowell Lock Monsters	AHL	57	1	6	7	167	—	—	—	—	—
2004–05	Houston Aeros	AHL	15	0	1	1	49	—	—	—	—	—
2005–06	Houston Aeros	AHL	40	1	1	2	125	8	1	0	1	13
2006–07	Houston Aeros	AHL	39	2	4	6	94	—	—	—	—	—
NHL totals			73	4	1	5	176	—	—	—	—	—
AHL totals			366	18	51	69	955	26	1	0	1	51

== Awards and honors ==
Award	Year
WHL
Memorial Cup (Portland Winter Hawks)	1998
