= Marián Hossa =

Slovak ice hockey player (born 1979)

- Hockey Hall of Fame, 2020
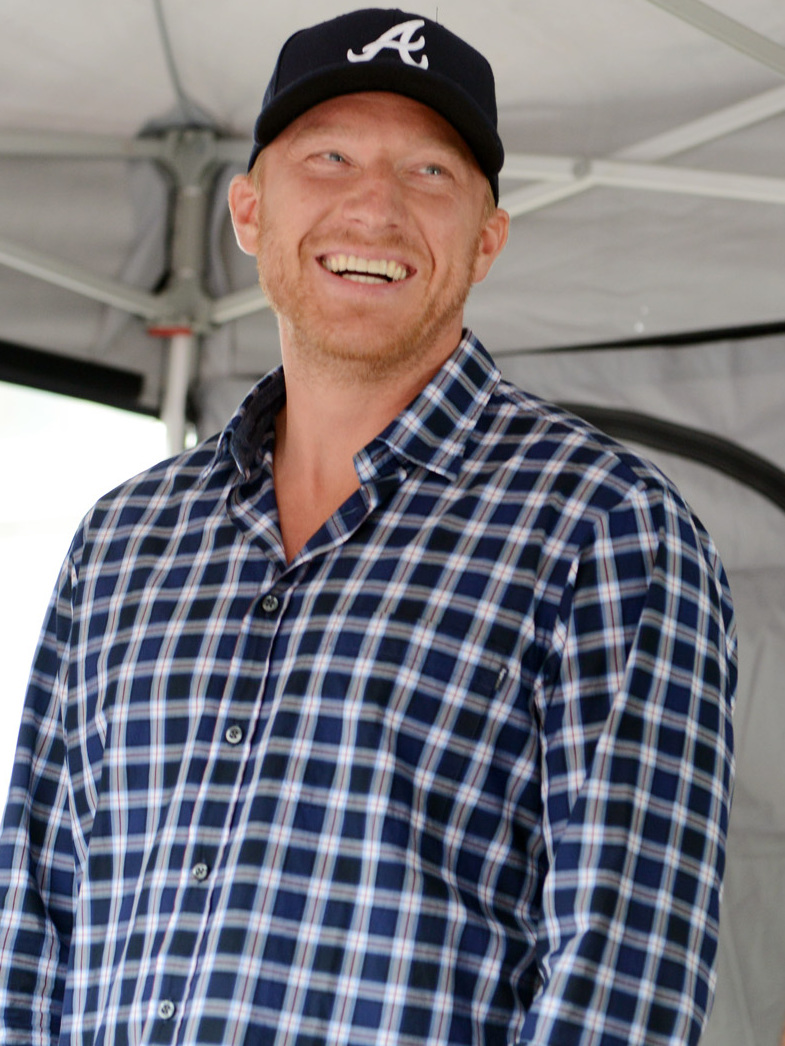
- Hossa in August 2013
- Born: 12 January 1979 (age 47) Stará Ľubovňa, Czechoslovakia
- Height: 6 ft 1 in (185 cm)
- Weight: 207 lb (94 kg; 14 st 11 lb)
- Position: Right wing
- Shot: Left
- Played for: Dukla Trenčín; Ottawa Senators; Mora IK; Atlanta Thrashers; Pittsburgh Penguins; Detroit Red Wings; Chicago Blackhawks
- National team: Slovakia
- NHL draft: 12th overall, 1997; Ottawa Senators
- Playing career: 1996–2017

Marián Hossa (Slovak pronunciation: [ˈmarijaːn ˈɦɔsa]; born 12 January 1979) is a Slovak former professional ice hockey right winger. Hossa was drafted by the Ottawa Senators in the first round, 12th overall, of the 1997 NHL entry draft. After spending his first seven NHL seasons with the Senators, he played for the Atlanta Thrashers, Pittsburgh Penguins, Detroit Red Wings, and Chicago Blackhawks. Over the course of his career, he made five NHL All-Star Game appearances and played in three consecutive Stanley Cup Finals with three different teams, finally winning the Stanley Cup in 2009–10 with Chicago. He won two additional Stanley Cup championships with Chicago during the 2012–13 and 2014–15 seasons.

Hossa's playing career ended prematurely in 2017 when he was suffering from a progressive skin disorder. His contract was traded to the Arizona Coyotes in 2018 and he formally retired in 2022. Hossa accumulated 525 goals and 609 assists for 1,134 points in 1,309 regular-season games over his 19-year NHL career. He was the 44th player in NHL history to score 500 goals, and the 80th player to score 1,000 points. He was elected into the Hockey Hall of Fame in 2020.

== Playing career ==
As a youth, Hossa played in the 1993 Quebec International Pee-Wee Hockey Tournament with a team from Bratislava.

=== Ottawa Senators (1998–2004) ===
Hossa was drafted in the first round, 12th overall, by the Ottawa Senators in the 1997 NHL entry draft from Dukla Trenčín of the Slovak Extraliga. Shortly thereafter, he was selected fifth overall in the 1997 Canadian Hockey League (CHL) Import Draft by the Portland Winterhawks of the Western Hockey League (WHL), acquiring his major junior rights if he did not immediately stick with the Senators in the NHL.

After seven games in the NHL, the Senators assigned Hossa to junior, where he tallied 45 goals and 40 assists for 85 points in 53 games with the Winterhawks in 1997–98, earning him the Jim Piggott Memorial Trophy as WHL rookie of the year, as well as CHL and WHL West First Team All-Star honors. He led the Winterhawks to a President's Cup as WHL champions en route to the 1998 Memorial Cup championship. Late in the third period of a tied championship game against the Ontario Hockey League (OHL)'s Guelph Storm, Hossa was injured by Guelph forward Ryan Davis (Who was assessed a major penalty for kneeing), forcing him out of the game. The Winterhawks went on to clinch the championship in overtime and Hossa returned to the ice on a chair as his teammates pushed him around with the Memorial Cup to celebrate the victory. With seven points in four tournament games, Hossa was named to the Memorial Cup All-Star team, along with teammate Andrej Podkonický.

The injury kept Hossa from joining the Senators for his rookie season in 1998–99 until December. Despite missing two months, Hossa managed 15 goals and 15 assists for 30 points in 60 games to earn NHL All-Rookie honours and finish second to the Colorado Avalanche's Chris Drury in Calder Memorial Trophy voting for rookie of the year.

The following year, in 1999–2000, Hossa improved to 29 goals and 56 points. However, late in the season, on 11 March 2000, he was responsible for an on-ice accident in which he high-sticked Toronto Maple Leafs defenceman Bryan Berard on the follow-through of an attempted shot. The resulting one-inch laceration nearly forced doctors to remove the eye and nearly ended Berard's playing career. Deeply regretful and concerned, Hossa went to visit Berard in the hospital the next day to offer an apology, to which Berard absolved him of any responsibility.

Hossa recorded 32 goals and 75 points in 2000–01, finishing second in team scoring behind Alexei Yashin and earning his first NHL All-Star Game appearance in Denver.

In the subsequent off-season, his rookie contract expired, and Hossa became a restricted free agent. Unable to come to terms before training camp for the 2001–02 season, Hossa sat out the first two weeks before signing a three-year, $8.5 million contract on 26 September 2001. Despite Hossa's lucrative new contract, his production would dip to 66 points in the first year of the deal.

Hossa would regain form in 2002–03 with a career-high 45 goals, 35 assists and a team-leading 80 points, while competing in the 2003 NHL All-Star Game in Sunrise, Florida. He then led the Senators to a long playoff run where they were ultimately eliminated in seven games by the eventual Stanley Cup-champion New Jersey Devils in the Eastern Conference Finals. Hossa led the Senators with 16 points in 18 post-season games.

The following season, he led the Senators in scoring for the second consecutive season with a personal best 82 points, then added four points in seven games in the playoffs as the Senators were eliminated by the Maple Leafs in the first round.

Due to the 2004–05 NHL lockout, Hossa spent the 2004–05 season playing in Europe. Beginning the season in Slovakia, he joined Mora IK of the Swedish Elitserien to play with his younger brother Marcel after 19 games with former club Dukla Trenčín. After 32 points in 24 games with Mora IK, Hossa returned to Dukla Trenčín, where he completed the season for a total of 42 points in 22 games with the team.

=== Atlanta Thrashers (2005–2008) ===
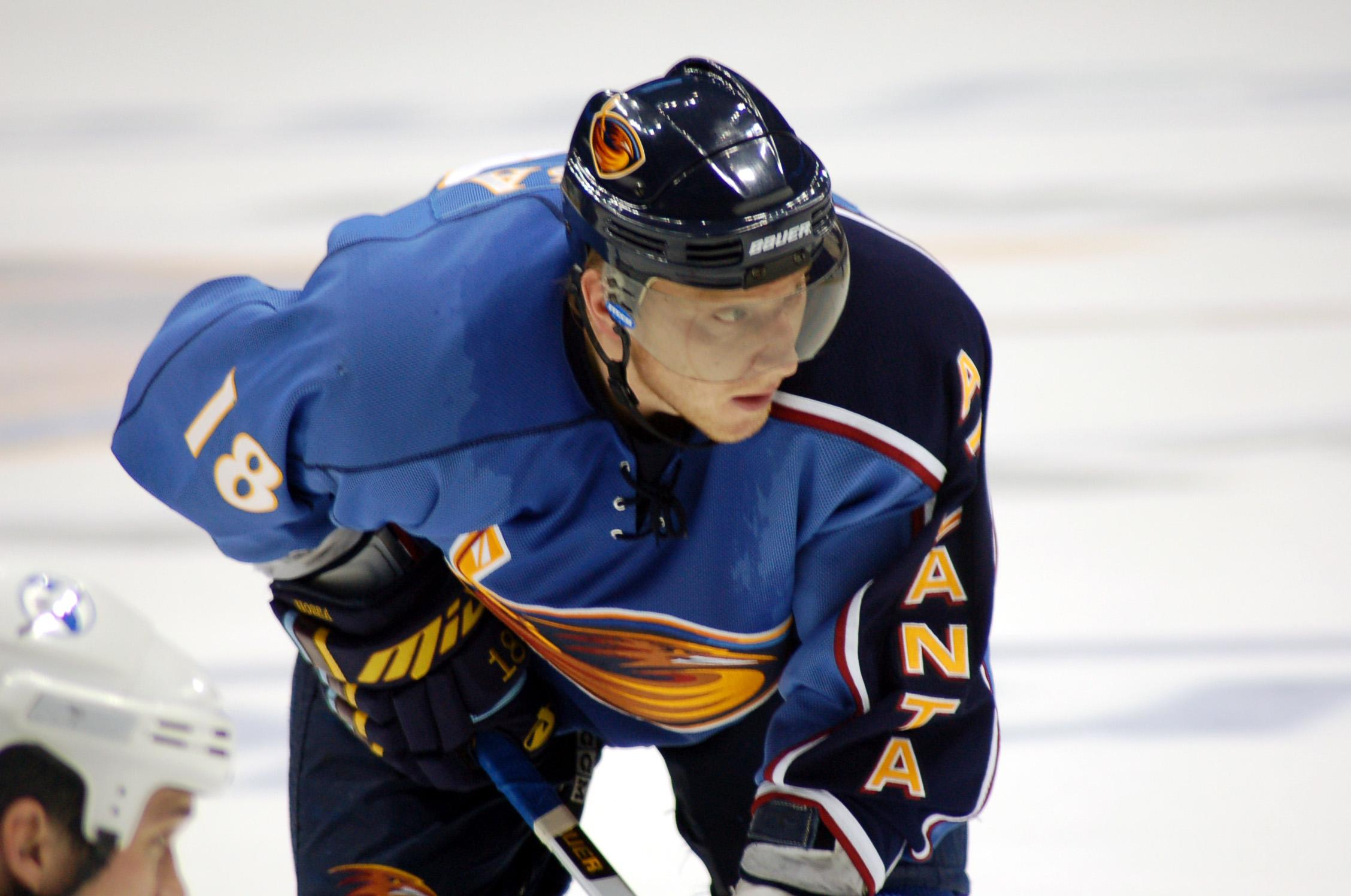
Hossa while a member of the Atlanta Thrashers in January 2006

With NHL play set to resume the following season in 2005–06 and Hossa's previous contract expired, he signed a three-year, $18-million deal with the Senators. However, the contract only precipitated a deal that sent him that same day to the Atlanta Thrashers along with defenseman Greg de Vries for all star forward Dany Heatley, who had requested a trade following the death of teammate Dan Snyder in a car crash for which Heatley was ruled responsible. Hossa joined star winger Ilya Kovalchuk and scored 39 goals and 53 assists for 92 points, surpassing his previous personal best by ten points, in his first season with the Thrashers.

In the 2006–07 season, Hossa made franchise history as the first Thrasher to score 100 points in one season, finishing with 43 goals and 57 assists; along with a plus/minus rating of +18. He was named to his third All-Star Game in Dallas, where he notched four assists. In the final game of the regular season, Hossa recorded two assists against the Tampa Bay Lightning to achieve the 100-point mark, which still stands as the franchise's single-season points record. The season also marked the first division title and post-season appearance for the Thrashers, clinching the Southeast Division title for the third playoff seed. Hossa, however, only managed one point in four games as the Thrashers were eliminated in the first round by the New York Rangers.

=== Pittsburgh Penguins (2008) ===
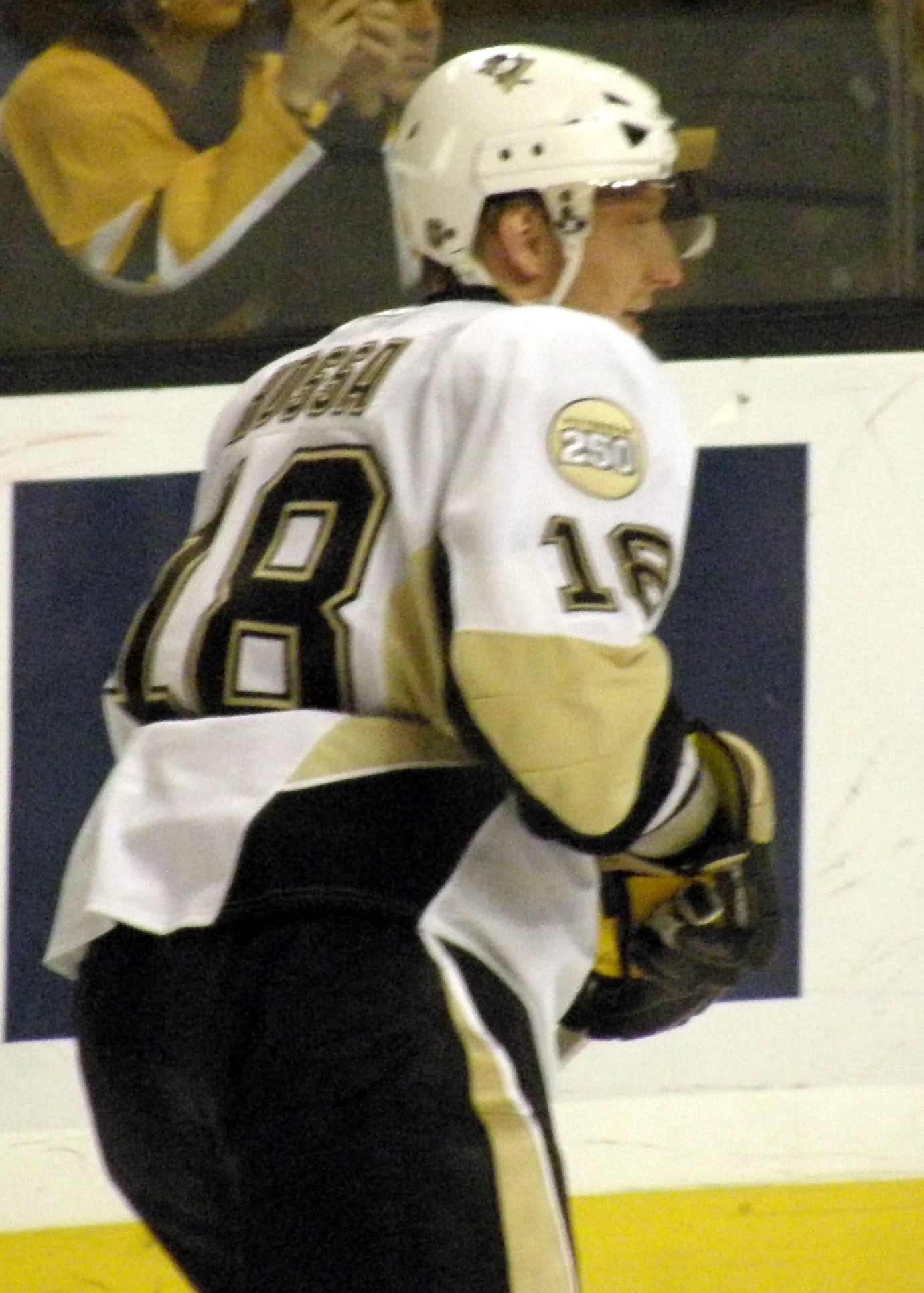
Hossa with the Pittsburgh Penguins in February 2008

In the last year of his contract with the Thrashers in 2007–08, the team and Hossa could not agree on an extension, Hossa was acquired by the Pittsburgh Penguins at the trade deadline on 26 February 2008, along with Pascal Dupuis, in exchange for Colby Armstrong, Erik Christensen, prospect Angelo Esposito and the Penguins' first-round pick in 2008 (Daultan Leveille). In his Penguins debut two days later, Hossa injured his medial collateral ligament (MCL) in a knee-on-knee collision with Glen Murray of the Boston Bruins. Hossa missed the next six contests before rejoining the team for the conclusion of the regular season, playing on a line with Dupuis and captain Sidney Crosby. Hossa completed the regular season with 66 points in 72 games split between the Thrashers and Penguins. He had also appeared in his fourth All-Star Game while still with the Thrashers as the host city.

Complementing an already high-powered offence led by Evgeni Malkin and Crosby, Hossa proved to be a vital cog in the Penguins' run to the 2008 Stanley Cup Final. He scored his first playoff overtime goal in Game 5 of the Eastern Conference Semifinals, his second of the contest, against Henrik Lundqvist to clinch the series, putting the Penguins into the Conference Finals against the Philadelphia Flyers. Eliminating the Flyers in five games, Hossa and the Penguins met the Detroit Red Wings in the Final. After scoring the opening goal in game five to help stave off elimination in a triple-overtime victory, Hossa scored his team-leading 12th and final post-season goal in the sixth and deciding game to pull the Penguins within one goal. However, the Penguins were ultimately defeated by the Red Wings 3–2. Hossa nearly forced overtime with the tying goal, but was stopped by goaltender Chris Osgood in the final seconds of the game. He finished third in playoff scoring with 26 points, behind Conn Smythe Trophy-winner Henrik Zetterberg of the Red Wings and linemate Sidney Crosby. Hossa's performance helped shed a reputation for post-season underachievement, as indicated by previous playoff dry spells with the Senators and Thrashers.

=== Detroit Red Wings (2008–2009) ===
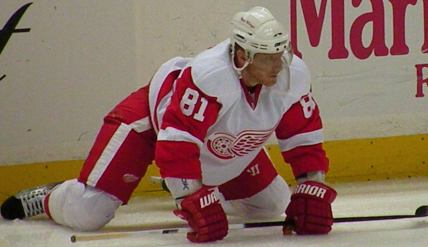
Hossa with the Detroit Red Wings in May 2009

Despite a reported five-year contract offer worth $7 million annually from the Penguins in attempts to retain his services, on 1 July 2008, Hossa signed a one-year deal with the Detroit Red Wings worth $7.45 million. Hossa had also reportedly turned down a multi-year offer from the Edmonton Oilers worth at least $9 million per season. Hossa explained that he opted for the shorter-term contract in hopes of a better opportunity to win a Stanley Cup with the Red Wings. With Red Wings' veteran forward Kirk Maltby already wearing Hossa's number 18, Hossa switched to 81 with Detroit. Hossa notched his first goal as a Red Wing on 18 October, an overtime winner against the New York Rangers, which also marked the 300th goal of his career. Hossa scored a goal in his return to Pittsburgh with the Red Wings on 8 February, where he was heavily booed by the Pittsburgh fans.

After missing two games due to a neck injury late in the season, Hossa was taken off the ice on a stretcher after falling headfirst into the boards following a check from St. Louis Blues defenceman Roman Polák on 3 March 2009. Escaping serious injury after having laid motionless on the ice for several minutes, it was revealed that in addition to minor neck complications, Hossa also suffered a bruised knee and was listed as day-to-day. Despite the injury, Hossa returned to finish the season with a team-leading 40 goals for his third career 40-goal season.

Late in the season, on 23 March 2009, Hossa was quoted as saying he would like to sign a long-term contract with the Red Wings for the upcoming season. He also stated he is willing to take less money to continue to play for Detroit, saying, "I know if I go somewhere else, I could have more, but I'm willing to take less to stay here. Hopefully things work out." Hossa's comments came just several months after the Red Wings signed forward Henrik Zetterberg to a 12-year contract extension.

As the Red Wings attempted to defend their 2008 Stanley Cup championship, Hossa met his former team, the Pittsburgh Penguins, as the two clubs met for the second straight year in the Final. The prospect of Hossa losing to the team he left to secure a Stanley Cup championship received considerable media attention. Before eliminating the Chicago Blackhawks in the Western Conference Finals, Hossa admitted meeting the Penguins in the finals "would definitely be very interesting." Ultimately, Hossa did, in fact, lose to his former team, falling by a 2–1 score in the seventh game. Immediately following the game, Hossa was asked whether he regretted his decision to leave the Penguins, to which he replied, "Regret? I don't regret it. It could be different circumstances if I sign in Pittsburgh, they probably couldn't sign some other players, and they'd be a different team." Hossa finished the 2009 playoffs with six goals and nine assists for a total of 15 points over 23 games.

=== Chicago Blackhawks (2009–2017) ===
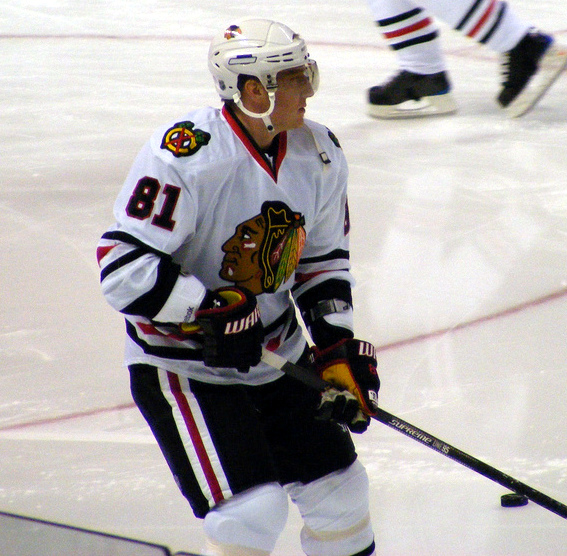
Hossa with the Chicago Blackhawks in November 2009

On 1 July 2009, Hossa signed a 12-year contract with the Chicago Blackhawks worth $62.8 million. The contract was front-loaded with $59.3 million due in the first eight years for an average cap hit of $5.2 million per season. It was also the most lucrative deal in team history until defenceman Duncan Keith signed a 13-year, $72 million contract several months later in December 2009. The signing of Hossa by the Blackhawks coincided with the departure of the team's leading scorer and MVP from the previous season and former Ottawa Senators teammate, Martin Havlát, to the Minnesota Wild that same day. Shortly after signing Hossa, the team disclosed that the veteran forward was still rehabilitating a shoulder injury he sustained during the previous post-season. The injury required Hossa to undergo surgery, and caused him to miss the first eight weeks of the season. With no. 18 retired for Hall of Famer Denis Savard, Hossa wore the no. 81 uniform for the Blackhawks, becoming the first and only player in the franchise's history to do so.

Hossa's contract negotiations became the subject of controversy in early August. On 31 July, the Ottawa Sun originally reported that the NHL launched an investigation into Hossa's long-term deal. Because the contract is front-loaded and expires by the time Hossa is 42, it was speculated whether retirement before expiry of the contract was part of the Blackhawks' negotiations. Such an agreement would be considered by the NHL to be a circumvention of the salary cap and the NHL Collective Bargaining Agreement (CBA), which would be subject to fines or the loss of draft picks. Even though the NHL did not fine or punish the Blackhawks, they later introduced a new rule preventing teams from front-loading contracts as lucratively as the Blackhawks did with Hossa.

After missing the first 22 games of the 2009–10 season, Hossa made his debut for the Blackhawks on 25 November 2009, against the San Jose Sharks, scoring twice, including a short-handed goal in the second period of the game. On 13 February 2010, Hossa suffered a concussion in a 5–4 shootout win over his former team, the Atlanta Thrashers as he took a blow to the head from Thrashers' winger Colby Armstrong, resulting in him missing the next game the next day against the Columbus Blue Jackets, where the Blackhawks clinched another 5–4 shootout win. The season was then paused for the next three weeks for the Olympics and Hossa recovered in time to compete in the 2010 Winter Olympic Games. During the Blackhawks' first playoff series in 2010, Hossa received a five-minute major penalty for boarding Nashville Predators defenceman Dan Hamhuis. With 13.6 seconds left in regulation, Hossa's teammate Patrick Kane tied the game. In the ensuing overtime, Hossa scored the game-winning goal on Predators goaltender Pekka Rinne seconds after exiting the penalty box. Since Hamhuis was not injured, the NHL did not fine or suspend Hossa. On 23 May 2010, the Chicago Blackhawks swept the top seeded San Jose Sharks to earn a trip to the 2010 Stanley Cup Final, sending Hossa to the Final for the third-straight year with his third different team, a first in the NHL. Fans and the media had dubbed Hossa's inability to win the Stanley Cup while going to the finals the "Hossa Curse" or the "Hossa Hex." According to Hossa's agent, Ritch Winter, Hossa's third consecutive year in the Stanley Cup Final was no coincidence, with Winter stating that they had used a mathematical model to determine the teams most likely to get at least 100 points in the 2009–10 regular season. On 9 June 2010, Hossa finally lifted his first Stanley Cup after the Blackhawks defeated the Philadelphia Flyers in six games. Chicago captain Jonathan Toews handed the Cup to Hossa first during the team pass-around. Hossa was the first player in NHL history to go to the Finals in three consecutive seasons with three different teams, a feat that would subsequently be repeated by Corey Perry in 2020, 2021 and 2022.

The start of the 2010–11 season injuries continued. On 27 October 2010, Hossa suffered an apparent shoulder injury in a 3–1 victory over the Los Angeles Kings after colliding with Kings' forward Jarret Stoll, causing him to miss the next five games. On 29 November, Hossa suffered a mild knee injury after colliding with teammate Nick Boynton in practice, resulting in Hossa missing the next 10 games. After the season's Christmas break, Hossa stayed injury-free the rest of the season and finished playing in 65 games with 25 goals and 32 assists for 57 points.

In 2011–12, Hossa was picked eighth overall by Team Chara in the second annual All-Star Fantasy Draft for the 2012 All-Star Game. In the game, Hossa scored one goal and two assists in a 12–9 win against Team Alfredsson. On 20 March 2012, Hossa scored his 900th NHL career point (417 goals and 483 assists) in his 970th game played via a goal scored against the Columbus Blue Jackets. He finished the 2011–12 season with 29 goals and a team leading 48 assists for 77 points in 81 games played. In the first period of Game 3 of the opening round of the 2012 Western Conference Quarterfinals, he was taken off the ice on a stretcher and briefly hospitalized with a severe concussion after being hit by the Phoenix Coyotes's Raffi Torres. Torres was suspended 25 games by the NHL for the hit, though it was later reduced to 21 games after an NHL Players' Association (NHLPA) appeal.

Hossa recovered in time for the start of the lockout-shortened 2012–13 season. He played 40 games and recorded 17 goals and 14 assists in the 48-game season, finishing third on the team with 31 points and helping the Blackhawks win the Presidents' Trophy as the regular season champions. During the season, he also played in his 1,000th career game on 3 March 2013, en route to a 2–1 win over his former team, the Detroit Red Wings. Hossa then scored seven goals and nine assists for 16 points in 22 games in the 2013 playoffs as the Blackhawks eventually defeated the Boston Bruins to win the Stanley Cup in the Finals. Hossa's trip to the Finals marked his fourth appearance in the Stanley Cup Final in the past six seasons.

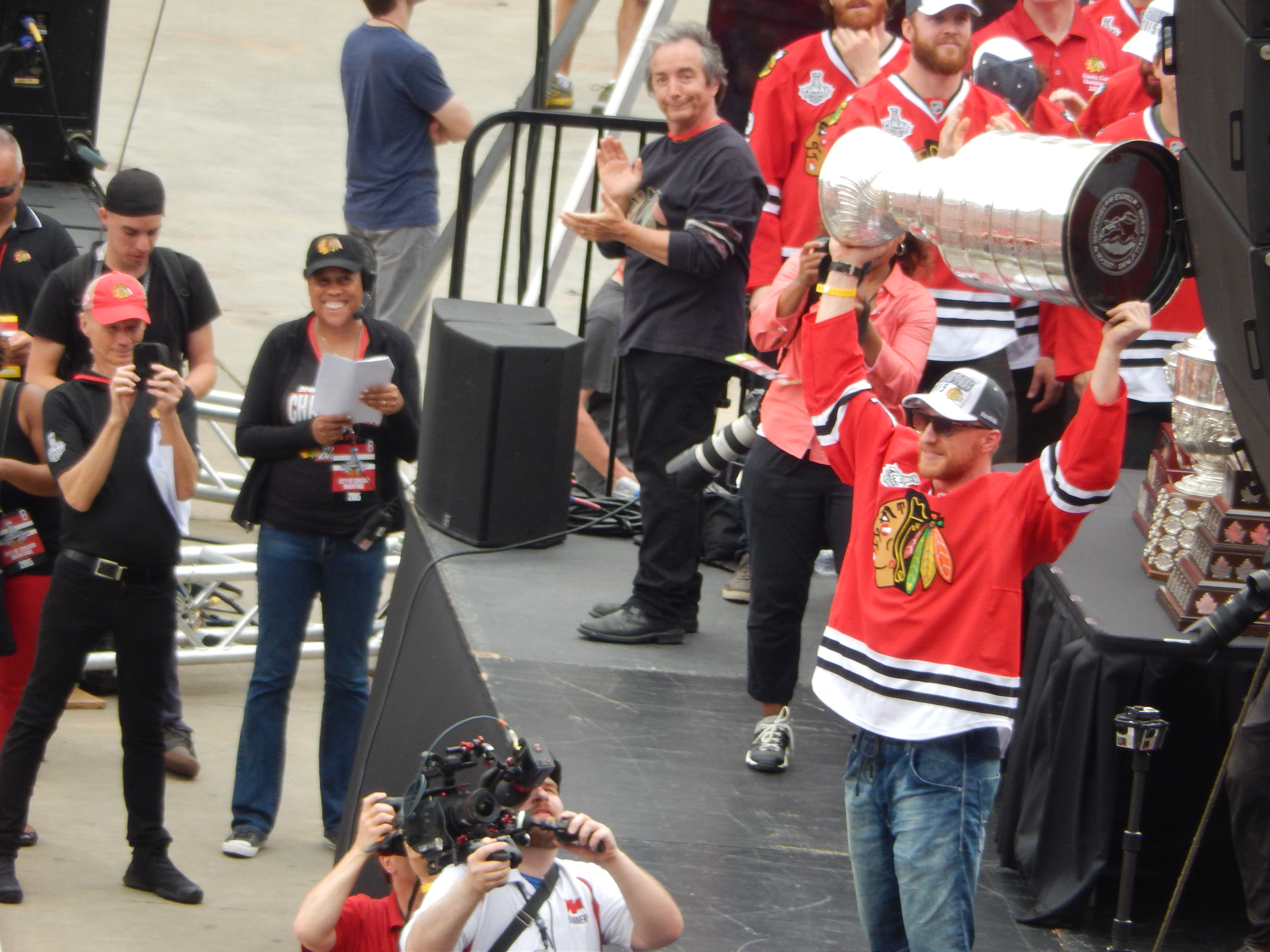
Hossa with the Stanley Cup in June 2015

On 30 October 2014, shortly into the 2014–15 season, Hossa scored his 1,000th career point with a goal against the Ottawa Senators, becoming the 80th player in NHL history to reach the milestone. On 15 June 2015, Hossa and the Blackhawks won the Cup for the third time in six seasons after Chicago's victory over the Tampa Bay Lightning in the Finals.

Hossa approached off-season training differently before the 2016–17 season. He performed more cardio-intensive workouts to improve his stamina and conditioning. On 18 October 2016, Hossa scored his 500th career NHL goal, which came in a 7–4 Blackhawks win over the visiting Philadelphia Flyers. Hossa became the second NHL player born in Slovakia to score that many (Stan Mikita), and the fifth player to score his 500th with the Blackhawks; Bobby Hull; Michel Goulet; Peter Bondra. Hossa rebounded in 2016–17 by scoring 26 goals and 19 assists for 45 points in 73 contests played.

=== Retirement ===
Before the start of 2017–18 season, the Blackhawks revealed that Hossa was suffering from eczema, a progressive skin disorder, and would miss the entire 2017–18 season while undergoing treatment. The Blackhawks officially placed Hossa on long-term injured reserve on 4 October 2017. In May 2018, Hossa announced he could no longer play professional hockey due to complications from his skin disorder. Hossa stated that if it was not for his condition, he felt that he could have still played a few more years.

The Chicago Blackhawks traded Hossa's contract, along with forward Vinnie Hinostroza, defenseman Jordan Oesterle, and third-round draft pick in the 2019 NHL Draft to the Arizona Coyotes in exchange for Marcus Kruger, MacKenzie Entwistle, Jordan Maletta, Andrew Campbell, and fifth-round draft pick in the 2019 NHL Draft.

On 24 June 2020, Hossa was elected into the Hockey Hall of Fame. He is the third Slovak-born player to be inducted into the Hall of Fame following Stan Mikita and Peter Šťastný. Hossa was only the second player to go to the Hall of Fame while still under contract, joining Chris Pronger, who was injured and under contract by Arizona when he was inducted into the Hall of Fame in 2015.

Hossa expressed interest in returning to the Blackhawks organization after his contract expires. When asked about the reunion during an October 2019 interview, he commented, "I would love to, so we’ll see what happens after my contract is done, but definitely there’s lots of love for me for Chicago and great people I got a chance to work with. So definitely that would be something I would look forward to, and we're gonna have a good talk and we'll see what's gonna happen."

Hossa signed a ceremonial one-day contract on 7 April 2022 to officially retire as a Blackhawk. The Blackhawks retired Hossa's no. 81 on 20 November 2022.

Hossa played in one final fundraiser game with many of his former teammates and friends including, Daniel Alfredsson, Duncan Keith, Zdeno Chára, Jonathan Toews, Marcus Krüger, Tomáš Kopecký, Viktor Stålberg, Niklas Hjalmarsson and Nicklas Lidström, on 18 August 2023 in Hossa's hometown, Trenčín.

== International play ==
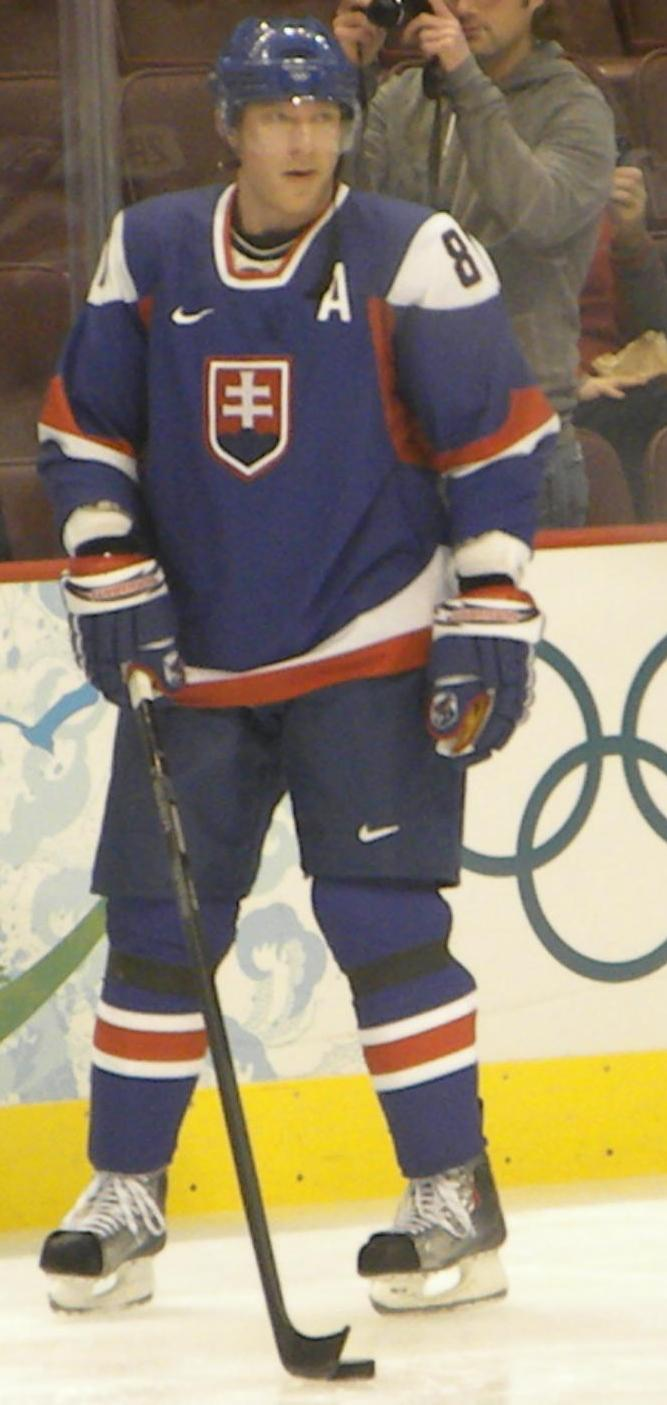
Marián Hossa at the 2010 Winter Olympics, where Slovakia finished fourth

Early in his career, Hossa represented Slovakia in two World Junior Championships, in 1997 and 1998. Also appearing in his first World Championships in 1997, tallying two points as an 18-year-old, Hossa has made seven appearances in the tournament throughout his career. Despite personal World Championship best seven-point performances in 1999, 2004, 2005 and 2006, Hossa has remained medal-less with the Slovak men's team.

Hossa made his Olympics debut at the 2002 Games in Salt Lake City, tallying six points in only two games for Slovakia. In the subsequent 2006 Winter Olympics in Turin, Hossa accumulated ten points in six games, but Slovakia was kept from the podium. During the 2010 Winter Olympics, Hossa scored the game-tying goal in the third period against Russia during the preliminary round. In the bronze medal game, Hossa scored a goal and an assist while playing against Finland. Slovakia lost to Finland 3–5, and ended up placing 4th overall in the Olympics.

Hossa also competed for Slovakia at the 2004 World Cup of Hockey, held before the NHL lockout, but managed just one goal in four games. During the 2004-05 NHL lockout, Hossa played for Mora IK, a professional ice hockey team in Sweden.

Hossa also played for Slovakia in the 2014 Winter Olympics at Sochi. Though Slovakia lost all four games, Hossa ended up scoring two goals and an assist.

In 2016, it was announced that Hossa would play for Team Europe at the World Cup of Hockey.

== Personal life ==
Hossa was born in Stará Ľubovňa, Czechoslovakia, to František Hossa, who was a professional hockey player, and Mária Hossová, a clothing designer. Hossa's brother Marcel Hossa, who is two years younger, was drafted by the Montreal Canadiens 16th overall in the first round in the 2000 NHL draft. Following in his footsteps, playing for both of Marián's previous junior teams, Dukla Trenčín and the Portland Winter Hawks. Both of the Hossas have played together for Mora IK of the Elitserien during the 2004–05 NHL lockout and on the Slovak national team in the World Championships and Winter Olympics. Coincidentally, they were both dealt by their NHL teams on the day of the 2007–08 trade deadline — Marián from Atlanta to Pittsburgh and Marcel from the New York Rangers to the Phoenix Coyotes. The younger Hossa is no longer playing professional hockey. His last season was in 2017–18, where he played with HK Dukla Trencin. Hossa also grew up with Marián Gáborík and Zdeno Chára in Trenčín, and remained close friends with them through his NHL career. Trenčín honored the trio by naming three streets after each skater in 2015. Marián's father was head coach of the Slovak national team and coached his sons in several tournaments.

In July 2010, Hossa married his long-time girlfriend in his hometown, Trenčín, Slovakia. They have three daughters.

Hossa founded Hoss Corp in Trenčín, a company that combines its realty development activities with the community-focused work of its non-profit, Hoss Heroes.

Hossa's autobiography, Marián Hossa: My Journey from Trencín to the Hall of Fame, was released in November 2022.

== Career statistics ==
=== Regular season and playoffs ===
			Regular season					Playoffs
Season	Team	League	GP	G	A	Pts	PIM	GP	G	A	Pts	PIM
1995–96	Dukla Trenčín	SVK U20	53	42	49	91	26	—	—	—	—	—
1996–97	Dukla Trenčín	SVK	46	25	19	44	33	7	5	5	10	—
1997–98	Portland Winter Hawks	WHL	53	45	40	85	50	16	13	6	19	6
1997–98	Ottawa Senators	NHL	7	0	1	1	0	—	—	—	—	—
1998–99	Ottawa Senators	NHL	60	15	15	30	37	4	0	2	2	4
1999–00	Ottawa Senators	NHL	78	29	27	56	32	6	0	0	0	2
2000–01	Ottawa Senators	NHL	81	32	43	75	44	4	1	1	2	4
2001–02	Dukla Trenčín	SVK	8	3	4	7	16	—	—	—	—	—
2001–02	Ottawa Senators	NHL	80	31	35	66	50	12	4	6	10	2
2002–03	Ottawa Senators	NHL	80	45	35	80	34	18	5	11	16	6
2003–04	Ottawa Senators	NHL	81	36	46	82	46	7	3	1	4	0
2004–05	Mora IK	SEL	24	18	14	32	22	—	—	—	—	—
2004–05	Dukla Trenčín	SVK	25	22	20	42	38	5	4	5	9	14
2005–06	Atlanta Thrashers	NHL	80	39	53	92	67	—	—	—	—	—
2006–07	Atlanta Thrashers	NHL	82	43	57	100	49	4	0	1	1	6
2007–08	Atlanta Thrashers	NHL	60	26	30	56	30	—	—	—	—	—
2007–08	Pittsburgh Penguins	NHL	12	3	7	10	6	20	12	14	26	12
2008–09	Detroit Red Wings	NHL	74	40	31	71	63	23	6	9	15	10
2009–10	Chicago Blackhawks	NHL	57	24	27	51	18	22	3	12	15	25
2010–11	Chicago Blackhawks	NHL	65	25	32	57	32	7	2	4	6	2
2011–12	Chicago Blackhawks	NHL	81	29	48	77	20	3	0	0	0	0
2012–13	Chicago Blackhawks	NHL	40	17	14	31	16	22	7	9	16	2
2013–14	Chicago Blackhawks	NHL	72	30	30	60	20	19	2	12	14	8
2014–15	Chicago Blackhawks	NHL	82	22	39	61	32	23	4	13	17	10
2015–16	Chicago Blackhawks	NHL	64	13	20	33	24	7	3	2	5	0
2016–17	Chicago Blackhawks	NHL	73	26	19	45	8	4	0	0	0	2
NHL totals			1,309	525	609	1,134	628	205	52	97	149	95

=== International ===
Year	Team	Event	GP	G	A	Pts	PIM
1996	Slovakia	EJC	5	1	3	4	6
1997	Slovakia	WJC	6	5	2	7	2
1997	Slovakia	EJC	2	3	0	3	0
1997	Slovakia	WC	8	0	2	2	0
1998	Slovakia	WJC	6	4	4	8	12
1999	Slovakia	WC	6	5	2	7	8
2001	Slovakia	WC	6	1	2	3	2
2002	Slovakia	OLY	2	4	2	6	0
2004	Slovakia	WC	9	2	5	7	2
2004	Slovakia	WCH	4	1	0	1	2
2005	Slovakia	WC	7	4	3	7	6
2006	Slovakia	OLY	6	5	5	10	4
2006	Slovakia	WC	5	1	6	7	0
2007	Slovakia	WC	6	2	4	6	6
2010	Slovakia	OLY	7	3	6	9	6
2011	Slovakia	WC	5	1	1	2	2
2014	Slovakia	OLY	4	2	1	3	4
2016	Europe	WCH	6	1	0	1	4
Junior totals			19	13	9	22	20
Senior totals			81	32	39	71	46

== Awards ==
=== WHL and CHL ===
Award	Year
WHL West first All-Star team	1998
Jim Piggott Memorial Trophy	1998
CHL first All-Star team	1998
CHL All-Rookie Team	1998
President's Cup champion	1998
Memorial Cup Champion(Portland Winter Hawks)	1998
Memorial Cup Tournament All-Star team	1998

=== NHL ===
Award	Year(s)
NHL All-Rookie Team	1999
NHL All-Star Game	2001, 2003, 2007, 2008, 2012
NHL second All-Star team	2009
Stanley Cup champion	2010, 2013, 2015

== See also ==
- Notable families in the NHL
- Slovaks in the NHL
- List of NHL players with 500 goals

Awards and achievements
Preceded by Chris Phillips	Ottawa Senators first-round draft pick 1997	Succeeded by Mathieu Chouinard
