= 1998 in ice hockey =

== Olympics ==
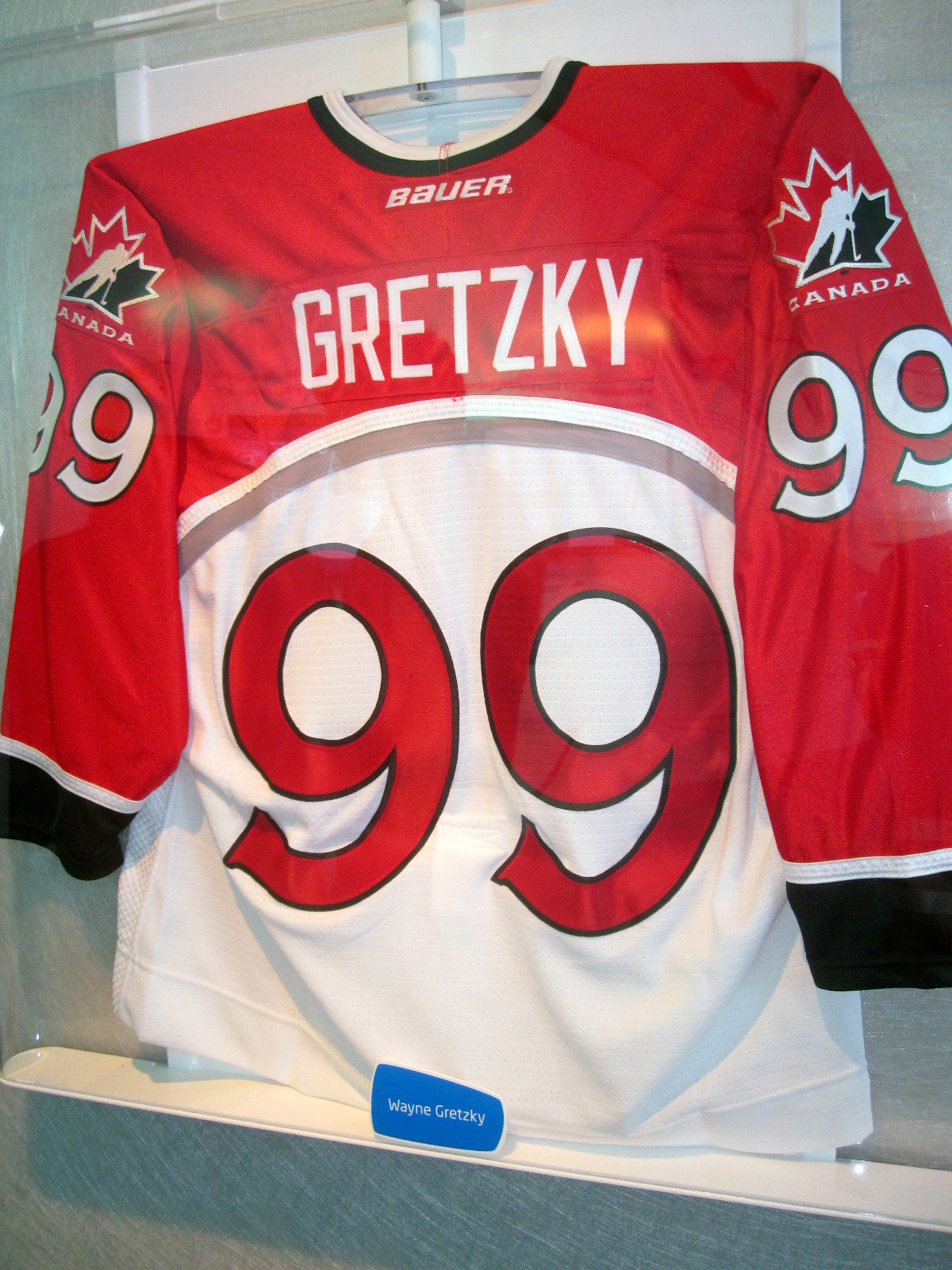
Team Canada sweater worn by Gretzky during the 1998 Winter Olympics

== National Hockey League ==
- Art Ross Trophy as the NHL's leading scorer during the regular season: Jaromír Jágr
- Hart Memorial Trophy: for the NHL's Most Valuable Player: Dominik Hašek
- Stanley Cup - Detroit Red Wings defeat the Washington Capitals in the 1998 Stanley Cup Finals
- The Tampa Bay Lightning selected Vincent Lecavalier with the first pick overall in the 1998 NHL Draft. The expansion Nashville Predators participated in the Draft for the first time, choosing David Legwand as the first-ever pick in franchise history.

== Canadian Hockey League ==
- Ontario Hockey League: The Guelph Storm captured the J. Ross Robertson Cup.
- Quebec Major Junior Hockey League: They won the President's Cup (QMJHL)
- Western Hockey League: They won the President's Cup (WHL)
- Memorial Cup: The Spokane Chiefs served as host team for the 1998 Memorial Cup, which was won by the Portland Winter Hawks.

== Season articles ==
1997–98 NHL season	1998–99 NHL season
1998–99 AHL season	1998–99 AHL season

== See also ==
- 1998 in sports
