= Brenden Morrow =

Canadian ice hockey player (born 1979)

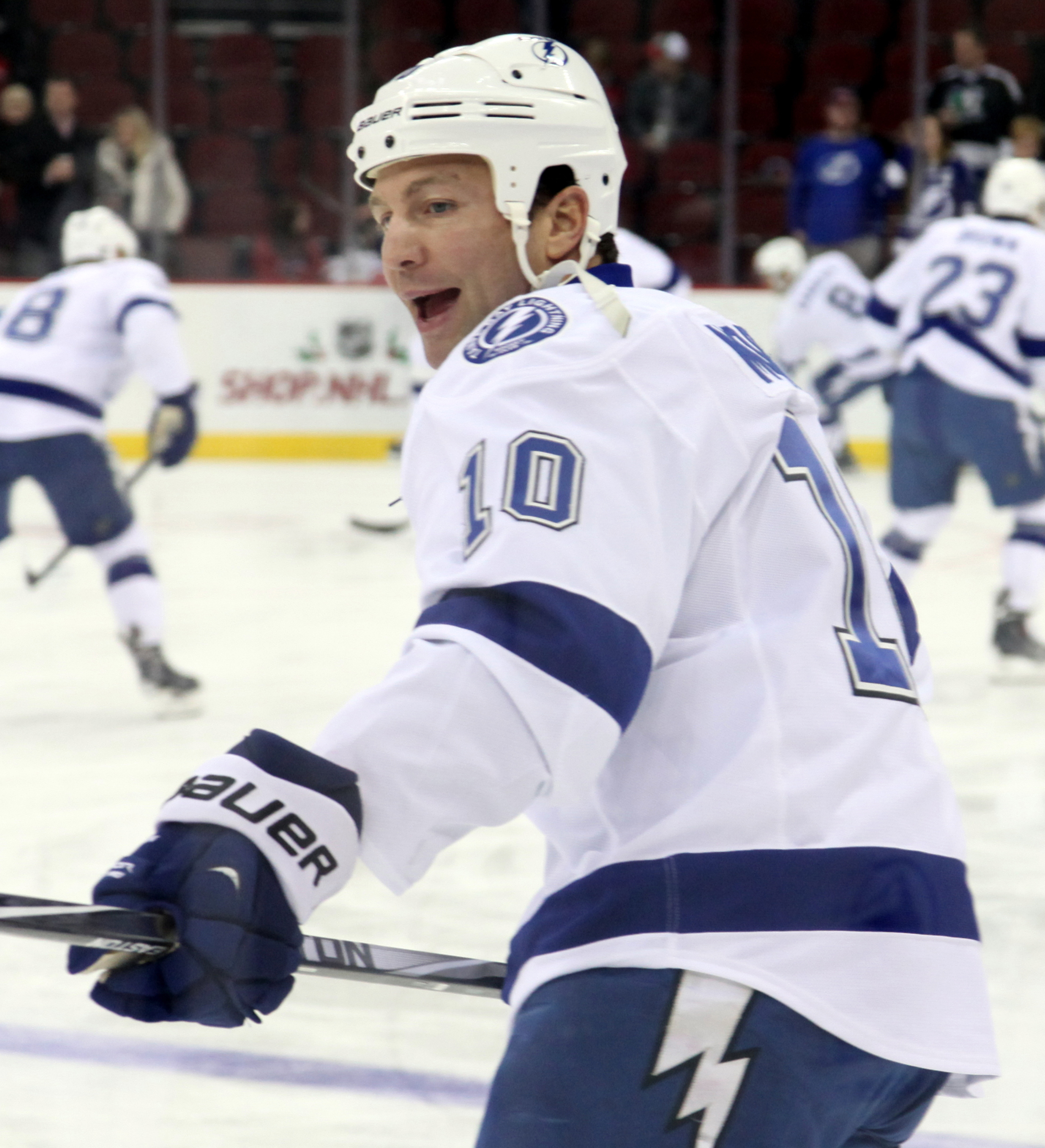
- Morrow with the Tampa Bay Lightning in December 2014
- Born: January 16, 1979 (age 47) Carlyle, Saskatchewan, Canada
- Height: 5 ft 11 in (180 cm)
- Weight: 212 lb (96 kg; 15 st 2 lb)
- Position: Left wing
- Shot: Left
- Played for: Dallas Stars; Pittsburgh Penguins; St. Louis Blues; Tampa Bay Lightning
- National team: Canada
- NHL draft: 25th overall, 1997; Dallas Stars
- Playing career: 1999–2015
Medal record
Representing Canada
Ice hockey
Winter Olympics
Gold medal – first place	2010 Vancouver
World Championships
Gold medal – first place	2004 Czech Republic
Silver medal – second place	2005 Austria
World Cup
Gold medal – first place	2004 Canada
World Junior Championships
Silver medal – second place	1999 Canada

Brenden Blair Morrow (born January 16, 1979) is a Canadian former professional ice hockey left winger. Morrow was drafted in the first round, 25th overall, by the Dallas Stars at the 1997 NHL entry draft, the organization he would play with for 13 seasons before brief stints with the Pittsburgh Penguins, St. Louis Blues, and Tampa Bay Lightning.

Morrow played major junior hockey in the Western Hockey League (WHL) for the Portland Winter Hawks. During his junior career, he helped Portland win the 1998 Memorial Cup during the 1997–98 season.

Internationally, Morrow represented Canada, first winning a silver medal at the 1999 World Junior Championships with the junior team. He has also represented the senior Team Canada squad, most often at the Ice Hockey World Championships (four times), winning a gold medal in 2004 and a silver medal in 2005. He also played for Canada at the 2004 World Cup of Hockey, which Canada won. Morrow was named to Canada's roster for the 2010 Winter Olympics, where he scored two goals and added an assist in the tournament as Canada won gold.

== Playing career ==
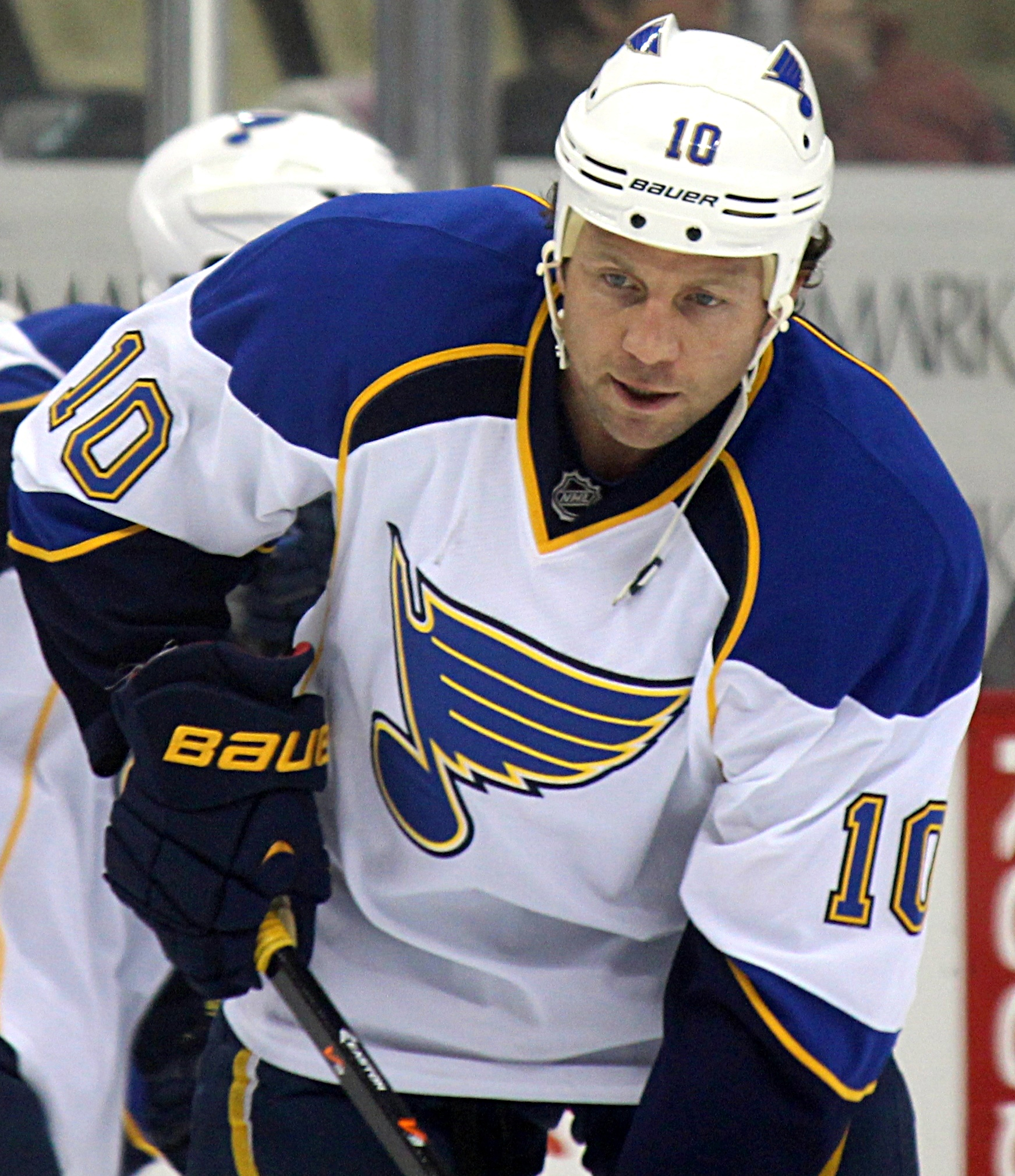
Morrow with the St. Louis Blues in March 2014

=== Minor ===
Morrow played minor hockey in his hometown of Carlyle, Saskatchewan, and in the nearby community of Estevan. Despite putting up impressive numbers in his final year of bantam hockey (117 goals, 72 assists in 60 games), Morrow was not selected in the WHL Bantam Draft, and instead walked-on with the Portland Winter Hawks.

=== Junior ===
Morrow spent his entire junior career with the Winterhawks. In his rookie WHL season, he played in 65 games and recorded 25 points (13 goals and 12 assists). Later in his junior career, Morrow contributed more offensively and in his final three seasons in the WHL, he scored 88, 86 and 85 points, respectively. After the 1996–97 season, Morrow was selected by the Dallas Stars in the first round, 25th overall, of the 1997 NHL entry draft. During the 1997–98 WHL Season, Morrow helped the Winterhawks capture the Memorial Cup. During the 1998 Memorial Cup tournament, Morrow scored one goal and added two assists in four games. He represented the Western Conference in the WHL's All-Star Classic three times, in 1997, 1998 and 1999. After the 1998–99 season, Morrow was named to the WHL's Western Conference First All-Star Team and also to the CHL Third All-Star Team.

=== Professional ===
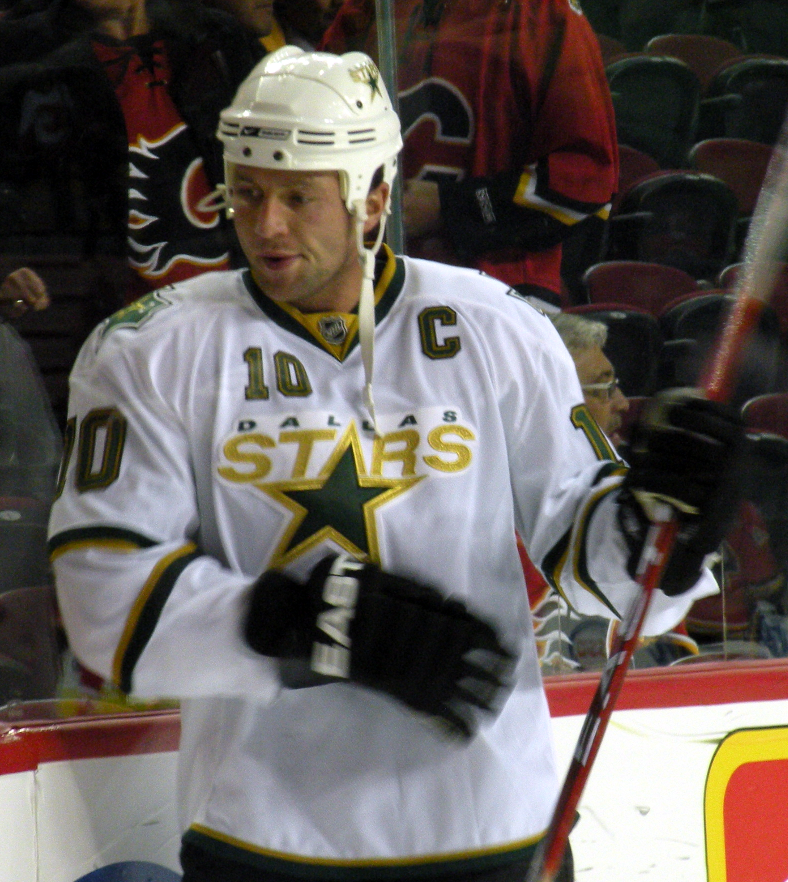
Morrow in October 2009. He spent most of his career with the Dallas Stars.

Morrow began his professional career in 1999. He split the 1999–2000 season between the NHL's Dallas Stars and the Michigan K-Wings of the International Hockey League (IHL). He played his first game with the Stars on November 18, 1999, against the Philadelphia Flyers, and recorded his first points (a goal and an assist) on November 22, 1999, against the Colorado Avalanche. After this season, Morrow was named the team's Rookie of the Year.

After his rookie campaign with the Stars, Morrow became a regular fixture in the Dallas lineup, playing at least 70 games in each season until the 2006–07 season, when he missed 33 games after suffering severed tendons in his wrist. He bounced back with a strong 2007–08 season, where he played in all of the Stars' 82 games, but a knee injury (an ACL tear) limited him to just 18 games in 2008–09. He has often played through injuries, including a return to play despite breaking a bone in his ankle during the 2000 Stanley Cup playoffs.

Morrow played in the NHL YoungStars Game at the 2002 NHL All-Star Game, which was held in Los Angeles, California, where he scored a goal and added an assist. During the 2001–02 NHL season, he recorded his 100th career NHL point against the San Jose Sharks. He recorded his 300th career NHL point against the Chicago Blackhawks during the 2006–07 NHL season.

During the NHL lockout of 2004–05, Morrow signed a contract with the Oklahoma City Blazers of the Central Hockey League and played in 19 games.

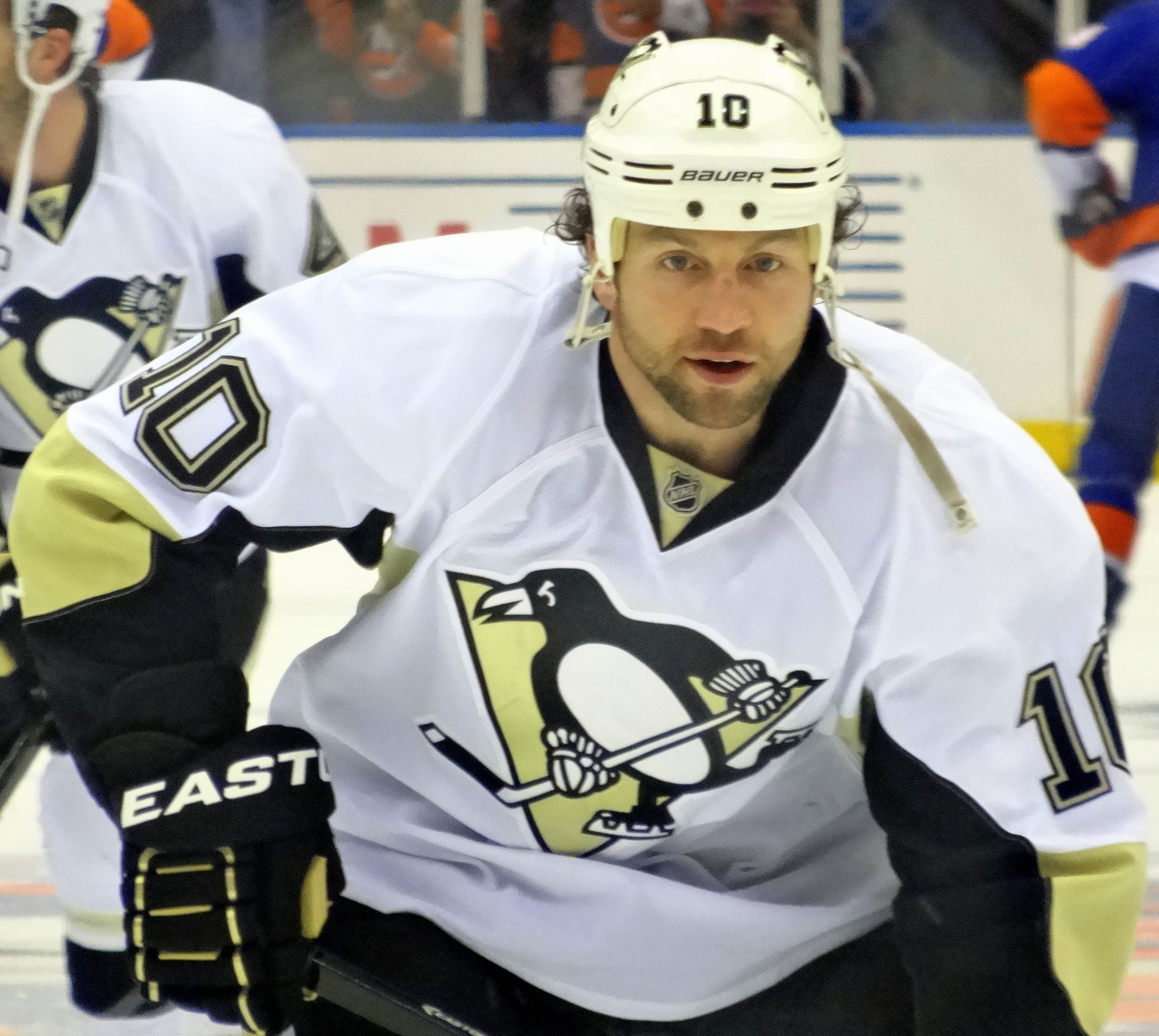
Morrow with the Pittsburgh Penguins during the 2013 Stanley Cup playoffs

Prior to the 2006–07 NHL season, Morrow was named the captain of the Stars, after the team asked incumbent captain Mike Modano to step down from the position. The Stars wanted to reward Morrow for his commitment to the team, after he bypassed free agency to sign a six-year contract with the team. The Stars also felt the need to shift some leadership responsibilities to younger members of the team. Morrow's teammates and coaches greatly admired his dedication to the team, and believed he was an ideal choice to fill the role.

Heading into the 2009–10 season, Morrow ranked 14th on the all-time scoring list for the Stars' franchise. He has a knack for scoring big goals, as evidenced by his scoring three of the team's last four overtime winning goals in the playoffs.

Morrow was injured often during the 2011–12 season. He missed 25 games due to shoulder and upper back injuries, including 18 matches at the beginning of the 2012 year. Morrow returned to action on March 9 after the Stars activated him from injure reserve.

On March 24, 2013, Morrow was traded to the Pittsburgh Penguins, along with Dallas' third-round pick in 2013, in exchange for Joe Morrow (no relation) and the Penguins' 2013 fifth-round draft pick.

On September 23, 2013, Morrow signed a one-year deal as an unrestricted free agent with the St. Louis Blues.

On July 11, 2014, Morrow signed as a free agent to a one-year deal with the Tampa Bay Lightning. On June 17, 2015, two days after losing in the Stanley Cup Final to the Chicago Blackhawks during exit interviews, Morrow stated that he may "give it one more go," though he stated that he could change his mind in two weeks when it was time to resume workouts. Morrow stated that he had not spoken to Lightning General Manager Steve Yzerman about returning to the team, but he stated that he would love to return. Morrow said that he "had more fun here in this short time than I've had in I don't know how many years." Despite this, the Lightning opted not to re-sign Morrow, who had finished the season with career-low offensive statistics, and Morrow went unsigned throughout the summer.

On March 17, 2016, Morrow announced his retirement. He bookended his career with Stanley Cup Final appearances in 2000 with the Stars and 2015 with the Lightning.

== International play ==
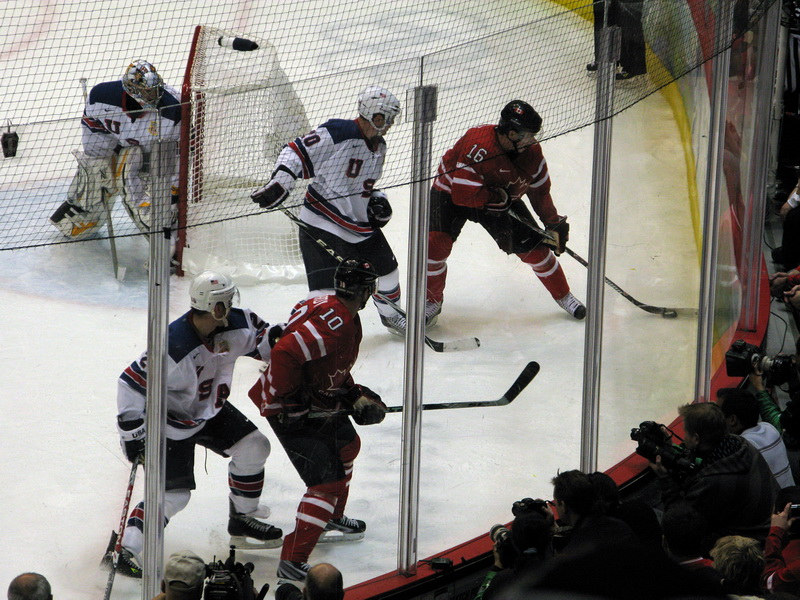
Morrow tries to assist his compatriot Jonathan Toews (#16) as he guards the puck against United States' Ryan Suter (#20) during the 2010 Winter Olympics

Morrow's first international experience with Hockey Canada was at the 1995 World U17 Hockey Challenge in Moncton, New Brunswick, where he played for Team West and finished fourth. He was selected to Canada's team at the 1999 World Junior Ice Hockey Championships, which were held in Winnipeg, Manitoba. During the tournament, Morrow scored one goal and recorded seven assists in seven games. During this tournament, Morrow set a Canadian World Junior record with five assists in one game against Kazakhstan. Canada finished the tournament with the silver medal after losing to Russia in overtime in the gold medal game.

Morrow has also represented Canada at the senior men's level, playing in the World Championships four times (2001, 2002, 2004 and 2005) after his NHL season was over. In these four tournaments, he did not score a goal for Canada, but contributed with five assists. In 2004, Morrow helped Canada to a gold medal and in 2005, captured the silver medal. Morrow played in a single game for Canada at the 2004 World Cup of Hockey, where Canada captured the championship.

Morrow was invited to Canada's summer evaluation camp prior to the 2006 Winter Olympics in Turin, Italy, but was not selected for the final squad. In August 2009, Morrow participated in Hockey Canada's summer orientation camp prior to the 2010 Winter Olympics in Vancouver, British Columbia, Canada. After a strong start to the 2009–10 season, Morrow was ultimately selected as a member of Canada's Olympic Men's Hockey Team. He was selected to the team to provide toughness and grit. As the tournament progressed, Morrow found himself playing a larger role on a physical line with Ryan Getzlaf and Corey Perry of the Anaheim Ducks. Morrow finished the tournament with two goals and one assist, as Canada captured the gold medal with an overtime victory against the United States.

== Personal life ==
Morrow is the son-in-law of former Montreal Canadiens coach and former Dallas Stars teammate Guy Carbonneau, having married Carbonneau's daughter Anne-Marie on July 20, 2002. They have three children together.

== Awards and honors ==
- 1998 Memorial Cup Champion (Portland Winter Hawks)
- Named to WHL West First All-Star Team (1999)
- 2004 Men's World Ice Hockey Championships gold medal
- Gold medal in the 2010 Winter Olympics (Team Canada)
- Inducted into the Winterhawks Hall of Fame (2018).
- Inducted into the Dallas Stars Hall of Fame (2024).

== Career statistics ==
=== Regular season and playoffs ===
			Regular season					Playoffs
Season	Team	League	GP	G	A	Pts	PIM	GP	G	A	Pts	PIM
1995–96	Portland Winterhawks	WHL	65	13	12	25	61	7	0	0	0	8
1996–97	Portland Winterhawks	WHL	71	39	49	88	178	6	2	1	3	4
1997–98	Portland Winterhawks	WHL	68	34	52	86	184	16	10	8	18	65
1998–99	Portland Winterhawks	WHL	61	41	44	85	248	4	0	4	4	18
1999–2000	Michigan K-Wings	IHL	9	2	0	2	18	—	—	—	—	—
1999–2000	Dallas Stars	NHL	64	14	19	33	81	21	2	4	6	22
2000–01	Dallas Stars	NHL	82	20	24	44	128	10	0	3	3	12
2001–02	Dallas Stars	NHL	72	17	18	35	109	—	—	—	—	—
2002–03	Dallas Stars	NHL	71	21	22	43	134	12	3	5	8	16
2003–04	Dallas Stars	NHL	81	25	24	49	121	5	0	1	1	4
2004–05	Oklahoma City Blazers	CHL	19	8	14	22	31	—	—	—	—	—
2005–06	Dallas Stars	NHL	81	23	42	65	183	5	1	5	6	6
2006–07	Dallas Stars	NHL	40	16	15	31	33	7	2	1	3	18
2007–08	Dallas Stars	NHL	82	32	42	74	105	18	9	6	15	22
2008–09	Dallas Stars	NHL	18	5	10	15	49	—	—	—	—	—
2009–10	Dallas Stars	NHL	76	20	26	46	69	—	—	—	—	—
2010–11	Dallas Stars	NHL	82	33	23	56	76	—	—	—	—	—
2011–12	Dallas Stars	NHL	57	11	15	26	97	—	—	—	—	—
2012–13	Dallas Stars	NHL	29	6	5	11	18	—	—	—	—	—
2012–13	Pittsburgh Penguins	NHL	15	6	8	14	19	14	2	2	4	8
2013–14	St. Louis Blues	NHL	71	13	12	25	76	2	0	0	0	0
2014–15	Tampa Bay Lightning	NHL	70	3	5	8	64	24	0	0	0	22
NHL totals			991	265	310	575	1,362	118	19	27	46	130

=== International ===
Year	Team	Event	Result	GP	G	A	Pts	PIM
1999	Canada	WJC	2nd place, silver medalist(s)	7	1	7	8	4
2001	Canada	WC	5th	1	0	0	0	0
2002	Canada	WC	6th	7	0	1	1	2
2004	Canada	WC	1st place, gold medalist(s)	9	0	3	3	12
2004	Canada	WCH	1st place, gold medalist(s)	1	0	0	0	4
2005	Canada	WC	2nd place, silver medalist(s)	9	0	1	1	6
2010	Canada	OG	1st place, gold medalist(s)	7	2	1	3	2
Junior totals				7	1	7	8	4
Senior totals				34	2	6	8	26

Preceded by Ric Jackman	Dallas Stars first-round draft pick 1997	Succeeded by Steve Ott
Preceded by Mike Modano	Dallas Stars captain 2006–13	Succeeded by Jamie Benn
