= Andrej Podkonický =

Slovak ice hockey player

- Born: 9 May 1978 (age 48) Zvolen, Czechoslovakia
- Height: 6 ft 0 in (183 cm)
- Weight: 209 lb (95 kg; 14 st 13 lb)
- Position: Left wing
- Shot: Left
- Played for: HKm Zvolen; Florida Panthers; HIFK; HC Slovan Bratislava; Iserlohn Roosters; Washington Capitals; HC Bílí Tygři Liberec; HC Kometa Brno; BK Mladá Boleslav
- National team: Slovakia
- NHL draft: 196th overall, 1996; St. Louis Blues
- Playing career: 1994–2015

Andrej Podkonický (born 9 May 1978) is a Slovak former professional ice hockey player. He played in the National Hockey League (NHL) with the Florida Panthers and the Washington Capitals. He is currently the senior coach of Avangard Omsk of the KHL. He previously coached HC Slovan Bratislava, of the Slovak Extraliga.

== Playing career ==
Podkonický was born in Zvolen, Czechoslovakia. As a youth, he played in the 1992 Quebec International Pee-Wee Hockey Tournament with a team from Slovakia.

He was drafted 196th overall by the St. Louis Blues in the 1996 NHL entry draft. After two seasons with the American Hockey League's Worcester IceCats, he was traded to the Florida Panthers for Eric Boguniecki on December 17, 2000. He played six games for the Panthers during the 2000–01 NHL season, scoring one goal. Podkonický then moved to Europe and played for HIFK in Finland's SM-liiga, HC Slovan Bratislava in the Slovak Extraliga and the Iserlohn Roosters in Germany's Deutsche Eishockey Liga. He signed with the Washington Capitals in 2003 and was assigned to the AHL's Portland Pirates, playing just two games for the Capitals. Podkonický then moved back to the Czech Republic and signed for HC Bílí Tygři Liberec. He spent the 2007–08 season in Russia for Vityaz Chekhov before returning to Liberec.

== International play ==
Podkonický played for Slovakia at the 2007 IIHF World Championship and the 2008 IIHF World Championship.

== Career statistics ==
=== Regular season and playoffs ===
			Regular season					Playoffs
Season	Team	League	GP	G	A	Pts	PIM	GP	G	A	Pts	PIM
1994–95	HKm Zvolen	Slovak.1	17	0	4	4	6	—	—	—	—	—
1995–96	HKm Zvolen	Slovak.1	32	11	9	20	22	—	—	—	—	—
1996–97	Portland Winter Hawks	WHL	71	25	46	71	127	6	1	1	2	8
1997–98	Portland Winter Hawks	WHL	64	30	44	74	81	16	4	12	16	20
1998–99	Worcester IceCats	AHL	61	19	24	43	52	4	0	0	0	4
1999–00	Worcester IceCats	AHL	77	16	25	41	68	9	2	5	7	6
2000–01	Worcester IceCats	AHL	16	2	3	5	15	—	—	—	—	—
2000–01	Florida Panthers	NHL	6	1	0	1	2	—	—	—	—	—
2000–01	Louisville Panthers	AHL	41	6	10	16	31	—	—	—	—	—
2001–02	HIFK	SM-l	23	3	6	9	41	—	—	—	—	—
2001–02	HC Slovan Bratislava	Slovak	16	11	2	13	2	—	—	—	—	—
2002–03	Iserlohn Roosters	DEL	52	18	15	33	54	—	—	—	—	—
2003–04	Washington Capitals	NHL	2	0	0	0	0	—	—	—	—	—
2003–04	Portland Pirates	AHL	56	12	14	26	31	—	—	—	—	—
2004–05	Bili Tygri Liberec	ELH	24	9	4	13	16	10	3	4	7	4
2005–06	Bili Tygri Liberec	ELH	39	11	26	37	76	5	1	2	3	16
2006–07	Bili Tygri Liberec	ELH	49	11	12	23	140	12	3	2	5	32
2007–08	Vityaz Chekhov	RSL	37	6	4	10	57	—	—	—	—	—
2007–08	Bili Tygri Liberec	ELH	5	1	0	1	2	9	2	1	3	8
2008–09	Bili Tygri Liberec	ELH	51	14	23	37	75	3	0	0	0	2
2009–10	Bili Tygri Liberec	ELH	43	13	19	32	61	15	6	5	11	8
2010–11	Bili Tygri Liberec	ELH	52	9	19	28	81	7	0	2	2	29
2011–12	HC Kometa Brno	ELH	16	3	3	6	10	—	—	—	—	—
2011–12	BK Mlada Boleslav	ELH	31	6	9	15	36	12	4	1	5	2
2012–13	HKm Zvolen	Slovak	53	24	25	49	112	17	6	6	12	14
2013–14	HKm Zvolen	Slovak	38	10	12	22	40	4	0	1	1	8
2014–15	HKm Zvolen	Slovak	55	16	21	37	88	7	0	3	3	6
NHL totals			8	1	0	1	2	—	—	—	—	—
ELH totals			310	77	115	192	497	73	19	17	36	101

=== International ===
Year	Team	Event	Result	GP	G	A	Pts	PIM
1995	Slovakia	EJC-B	9th	5	0	1	1	0
1996	Slovakia	EJC	7th	5	2	2	4	4
1996	Slovakia	WJC	7th	6	0	0	0	0
1998	Slovakia	WJC	9th	6	3	5	8	27
2007	Slovakia	WC	6th	4	0	0	0	2
2008	Slovakia	WC	13th	5	1	1	2	2
2010	Slovakia	WC	12th	6	1	1	2	4
Junior totals				22	5	8	13	31
Senior totals				15	2	2	4	8

== Awards and honours ==
Award	Year
CHL
Ed Chynoweth Trophy	1998
Memorial Cup All-Star Team	1998
Memorial Cup (Portland Winter Hawks)	1998
