= Andrew Ference =

Canadian ice hockey player (born 1979)

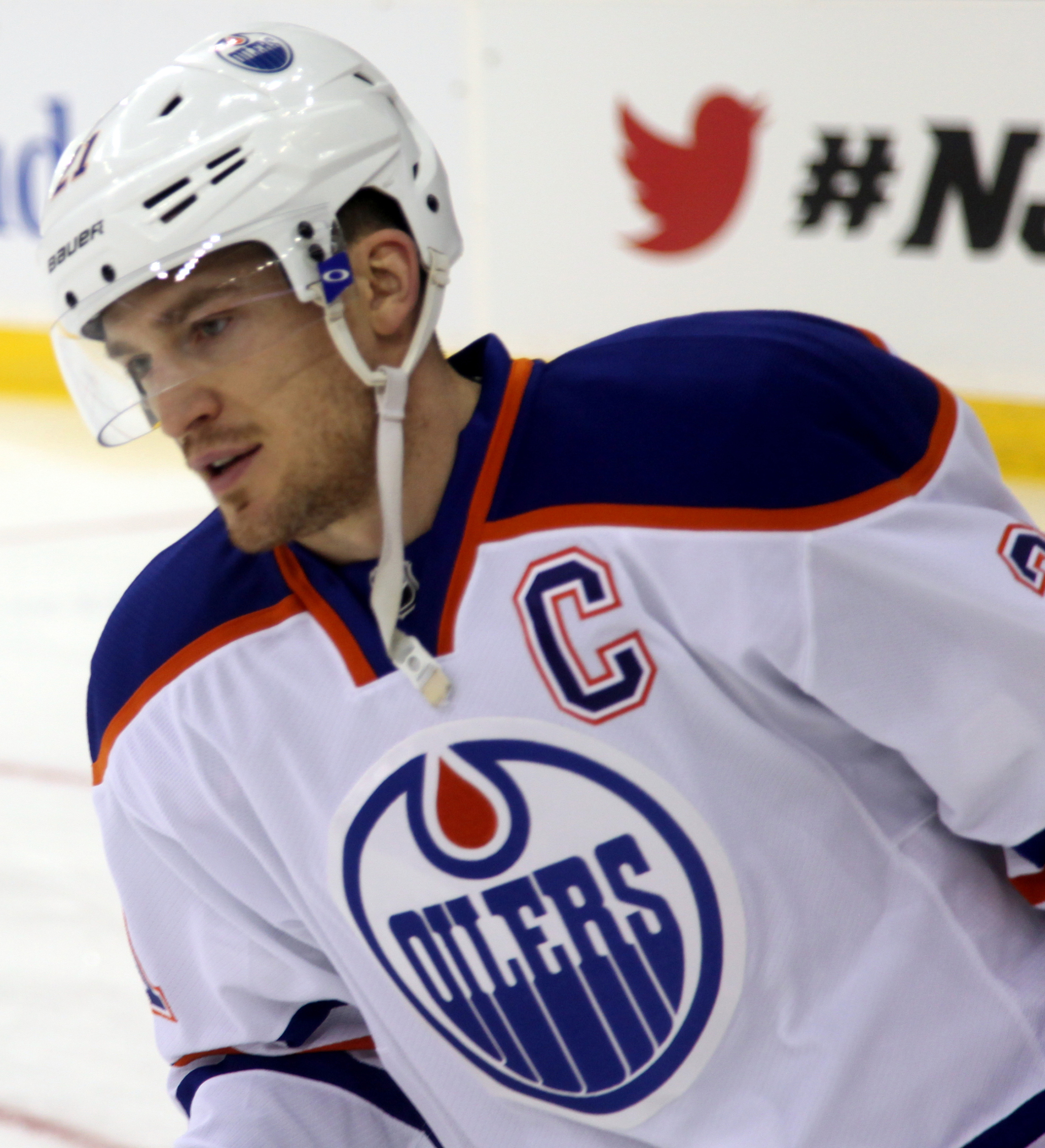
- Ference with the Edmonton Oilers in 2014
- Born: March 17, 1979 (age 47) Edmonton, Alberta, Canada
- Height: 5 ft 11 in (180 cm)
- Weight: 184 lb (83 kg; 13 st 2 lb)
- Position: Defence
- Shot: Left
- Played for: Pittsburgh Penguins; Calgary Flames; HC České Budějovice; Boston Bruins; Edmonton Oilers
- NHL draft: 208th overall, 1997; Pittsburgh Penguins
- Playing career: 1999–2015
Medal record
Men's ice hockey
Representing Canada
World Junior Championships
Silver medal – second place	1999 Canada

Andrew James Stewart Ference (born March 17, 1979) is a Canadian former professional ice hockey player. He played as a defenceman for the Pittsburgh Penguins, Calgary Flames, Boston Bruins and the Edmonton Oilers. In 2011, Ference helped the Bruins to their sixth Stanley Cup championship. Ference was born in Edmonton, but grew up in nearby Sherwood Park, Alberta.

== Playing career ==
=== WHL and Pittsburgh Penguins ===
Ference began his hockey career in the Western Hockey League (WHL) with the Portland Winterhawks. After two full seasons with the team, he was selected 208th overall by the Pittsburgh Penguins in the 1997 NHL Entry Draft. Ference was not ranked by Central Scouting for the draft. In response, Ference sent a letter to every NHL general manager indicating his belief he would play in the NHL and also enclosed testing results conducted by the University of Alberta. Ference played two more seasons with Portland and had a brief stint in the International Hockey League (IHL) with the Kansas City Blades before joining Pittsburgh in 1999.

After making his NHL debut on October 1, 1999, in a game against the Dallas Stars, Ference scored his first NHL goal a month later against the Nashville Predators on November 13, 1999. He split his rookie season between Pittsburgh and their American Hockey League (AHL) affiliate, the Wilkes-Barre/Scranton Penguins, finishing with 6 points (2 goals, 4 assists) in 30 NHL games and 28 points (8 goals, 20 assists) in 44 AHL games.

The next season, Ference continued to share time between both Penguins teams. Ference played in his first NHL playoffs with Pittsburgh in 2001, playing 18 games and scoring 3 goals and 10 points before the Penguins were eliminated by the New Jersey Devils. In his third NHL season, Ference established himself as a full-time NHLer, scoring 11 points in 75 games.

=== Calgary Flames and NHL Lockout ===
On February 9, 2003, in the middle of the 2002–03 season, Ference was traded to the Calgary Flames for future considerations. He posted 4 assists in 16 games during the remainder of the season with Calgary. The next season, he registered 16 points with 4 goals and 12 assists in 72 games for Calgary and also played 26 playoff games posting 3 assists. Calgary reached the 2004 Stanley Cup Final, where they lost to the Tampa Bay Lightning.

With the 2004–05 NHL season suspended due to a lock-out, Ference played in the Czech Republic for HC České Budějovice. Ference returned to the Flames when the NHL restarted the next season. He played all 82 games of the season for the first time in his career, scoring 4 goals, and 27 assists for a career high 31 points.

=== Boston Bruins ===
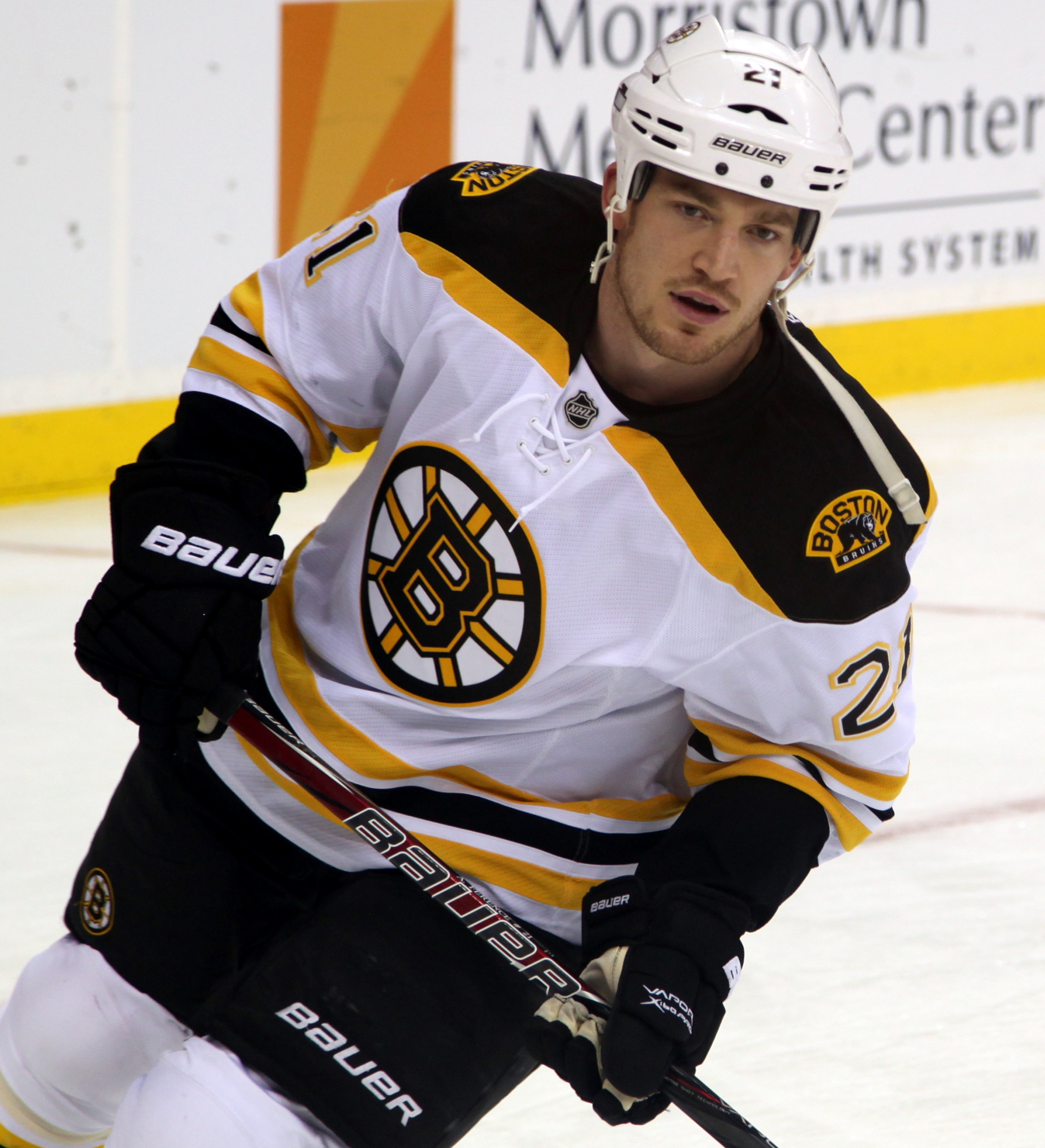
Ference with the Boston Bruins in January 2012.

The following season, on February 10, 2007, he was traded, along with teammate Chuck Kobasew, to the Boston Bruins for defenceman Brad Stuart and centre Wayne Primeau. Ference scored 1 goal, along with 15 assists, during the 2008–09 NHL season. On March 23, 2010, he agreed on a three-year contract extension with the Bruins worth an annual average salary of $2.25 million.

On April 22, 2011, Ference was fined $2,500 for giving the finger to the crowd at the Bell Centre in Game 4 of the playoffs first round series against the Montreal Canadiens after a scoring a goal. Ference's initial comments after the incident indicated it was an "equipment malfunction," though he later confessed it had been an intentional gesture following an emotional playoff goal. Some teammates credited this incident as a turning point in their eventual Stanley Cup Victory. In the Bruins 4–3 game 7 victory over the Montreal of the same series, Ference drew much ire for a questionable collision to the head of Canadiens' Jeff Halpern, but upon a disciplinary hearing it was ruled that the hit did not warrant any sort of disciplinary action. On June 15, 2011, Ference and the Boston Bruins defeated the Presidents' Trophy-winning Vancouver Canucks 4–0 in Game 7 of the Final to win the Stanley Cup.

In 2011–12, Ference scored six goals, a career high, and was named alternate captain during home games for the first half of the season, and during away games for the second half of the season.

=== Edmonton Oilers ===
On July 5, 2013, he signed a four-year deal as a free agent with his hometown team, the Edmonton Oilers. On September 29, Ference was named the 14th captain in Oilers NHL franchise history, succeeding Shawn Horcoff, who had been traded to the Dallas Stars. On October 7, 2015, after serving as the Oilers captain for the past two seasons, it was announced that Ference had relinquished his role as captain and was named as an alternate captain, along with Taylor Hall, Jordan Eberle and Ryan Nugent-Hopkins. After playing in just six games of the 2015–16 NHL season, Ference was placed on IR to undergo season-ending hip surgery.

On September 16, 2016, Ference announced his retirement after 16 seasons. He however remained on the Oilers long-term injured list for the duration of the 2016–17 season, before formally ending his career at the conclusion of his contract on July 13, 2017.

== Post-playing career ==
In 2018 Ference joined the NHL as its first Director of Social Impact, Growth and Fan Development. His focus will be on grass-roots growth, community development efforts, engaging minority fans and players, and better facilitating relations between players and the league.

In 2023 he would be named one of the top 100 Bruins players of all time.

== Personal life ==
=== Family ===
Ference and Krista Bradford, a former professional snowboarder, were married from 2002 to 2025, having two daughters together between that time.

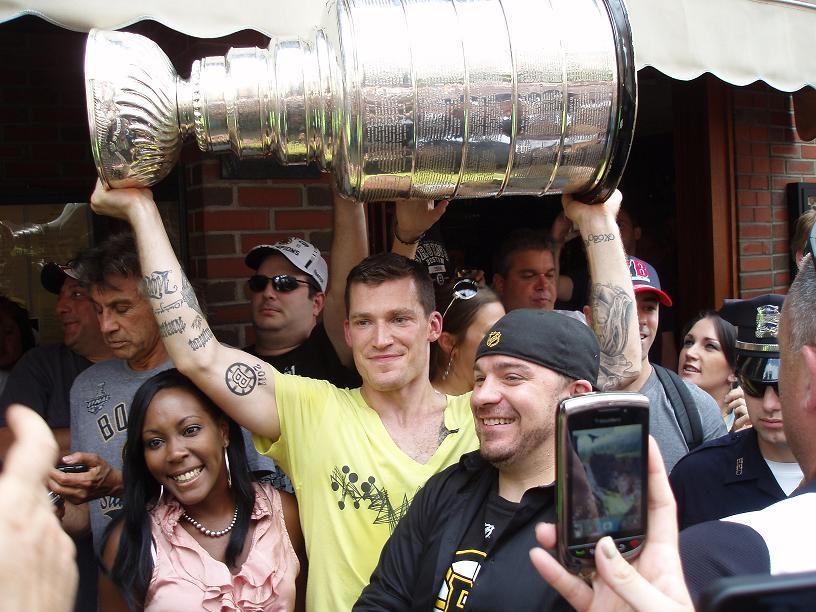
Ference during the North End Stanley Cup parade in September 2011.

=== Environmentalism ===
Ference's association with environmentalist David Suzuki while in Calgary led him to create a carbon-neutral program for the NHL, which now includes over 500 players who purchase carbon offset credits to counteract the negative environmental impact of professional sports.

In 2009, he spoke at the New Democratic Party's federal convention in Halifax.

In February 2012, National Geographic began a ten-episode Web series called "Beyond the Puck" highlighting Andrew's life as an NHL Player and "eco-warrior."

=== Stanley Cup Parade ===
On September 5, 2011, following the Bruins Stanley Cup championship, Ference organized and led a parade and flash mob in Boston's North End, which is the area where he resided during the NHL season. After bringing the Stanley Cup to and from Spaulding Rehabilitation Hospital on a bike trailer, Ference brought the Cup to an area of the North End outside the TD Garden. There, the Cup was hoisted up on a platform carried by friends and family, and paraded through the North End, with many stops at local shops along the way. Ference and the other Cup-carriers were accompanied by a marching band, members of The Boston Bruins Ice Girls, and the Boston Bruins mascot Blades. Hundreds of fans also joined them for the parade, which was concluded with a dancing flash mob.

=== Other ===
Ference is a fan of English Premier League football club Arsenal F.C.

Ference is also a member of the popular November Project workout tribe in Boston and Edmonton.

== Career statistics ==
=== Regular season and playoffs ===
			Regular season					Playoffs
Season	Team	League	GP	G	A	Pts	PIM	GP	G	A	Pts	PIM
1994–95	Portland Winter Hawks	WHL	2	0	0	0	0	—	—	—	—	—
1995–96	Portland Winter Hawks	WHL	72	9	31	40	159	7	1	3	4	12
1996–97	Portland Winter Hawks	WHL	72	12	32	44	163	6	1	2	3	12
1997–98	Portland Winter Hawks	WHL	72	11	57	68	142	16	2	18	20	28
1998–99	Portland Winter Hawks	WHL	40	11	21	32	104	4	1	4	5	10
1998–99	Kansas City Blades	IHL	5	1	2	3	4	3	0	0	0	0
1999–00	Wilkes–Barre/Scranton Penguins	AHL	44	8	20	28	58	—	—	—	—	—
1999–00	Pittsburgh Penguins	NHL	30	2	4	6	20	—	—	—	—	—
2000–01	Wilkes–Barre/Scranton Penguins	AHL	43	6	18	24	95	3	1	0	1	12
2000–01	Pittsburgh Penguins	NHL	36	4	11	15	28	18	3	7	10	16
2001–02	Pittsburgh Penguins	NHL	75	4	7	11	73	—	—	—	—	—
2002–03	Pittsburgh Penguins	NHL	22	1	3	4	36	—	—	—	—	—
2002–03	Wilkes-Barre/Scranton Penguins	AHL	1	0	0	0	0	—	—	—	—	—
2002–03	Calgary Flames	NHL	16	0	4	4	6	—	—	—	—	—
2003–04	Calgary Flames	NHL	72	4	12	16	53	26	0	3	3	25
2004–05	HC České Budějovice	CZE	19	5	6	11	45	—	—	—	—	—
2005–06	Calgary Flames	NHL	82	4	27	31	85	7	0	4	4	12
2006–07	Calgary Flames	NHL	54	2	10	12	66	—	—	—	—	—
2006–07	Boston Bruins	NHL	26	1	2	3	31	—	—	—	—	—
2007–08	Boston Bruins	NHL	59	1	14	15	50	7	0	4	4	6
2008–09	Boston Bruins	NHL	47	1	15	16	40	3	0	0	0	4
2009–10	Boston Bruins	NHL	51	0	8	8	16	13	0	1	1	18
2010–11	Boston Bruins	NHL	70	3	12	15	60	25	4	6	10	37
2011–12	Boston Bruins	NHL	72	6	18	24	46	7	1	3	4	0
2012–13	HC Mountfield	CZE	21	2	5	7	24	—	—	—	—	—
2012–13	Boston Bruins	NHL	48	4	9	13	35	14	0	2	2	4
2013–14	Edmonton Oilers	NHL	71	3	15	18	63	—	—	—	—	—
2014–15	Edmonton Oilers	NHL	70	3	11	14	39	—	—	—	—	—
2015–16	Edmonton Oilers	NHL	6	0	0	0	6	—	—	—	—	—
NHL totals			907	43	182	225	753	120	8	30	38	122

=== International ===
Year	Team	Event	Result	GP	G	A	Pts	PIM
1999	Canada	WJC	2nd place, silver medalist(s)	7	1	2	3	6
Junior totals				7	1	2	3	6

== Awards and honors ==
Award	Year	Ref
WHL
Memorial Cup champion	1998	
First All-Star Team (West)	1997–98	
Plus-Minus Award	1997–98	
Second All-Star Team (West)	1998–99	
Doug Wickenheiser Memorial Trophy	1998–99	
Inducted into Portland Winter Hawks Hall of Fame	2018	
AHL
AHL All-Star Game	2001	
NHL
Stanley Cup champion	2011	
King Clancy Memorial Trophy	2014	

Awards and achievements
Preceded by Jesse Wallin	Winner of the WHL Humanitarian of the Year Award; 1999	Succeeded by Chris Nielsen
Preceded by Patrice Bergeron	King Clancy Memorial Trophy winner 2014	Succeeded by Henrik Zetterberg
Sporting positions
Preceded by Shawn Horcoff	Edmonton Oilers captain 2013–15	Succeeded by Connor McDavid
