= Greg Leeb =

Canadian ice hockey player (born 1977)

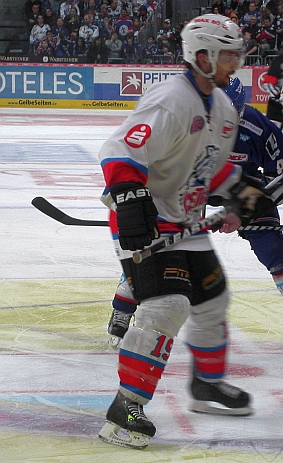
- Born: May 31, 1977 (age 47); Red Deer, Alberta, Canada
- Height: 5 ft 6 in (168 cm)
- Weight: 176 lb (80 kg; 12 st 8 lb)
- Position: Centre
- Shot: Left
- Played for: Coventry Blaze; Nürnberg Ice Tigers; Augsburger Panther; Dallas Stars
- NHL draft: Undrafted
- Playing career: 1998–2013

Gregory Leeb (born May 31, 1977) is a Canadian former professional ice hockey centre. He played 2 games in the National Hockey League with the Dallas Stars during the 2000–01 season. The rest of his career, which lasted from 1998 to 2013, was mainly spent with the Nürnberg Ice Tigers in the Deutsche Eishockey Liga. He ended his career with one season with the Coventry Blaze in the Elite Ice Hockey League. Greg is the brother of Brad Leeb.

== Playing career ==
Leeb got his start with the Spokane Chiefs in the Western Hockey League, where he played from 1994 to 1998. In four seasons with the Chiefs Leeb scored 127 goals and 164 assists for 291 points in 276 career games with the Chiefs. Leeb then played for the Michigan K-Wings (1998–2000), followed by stints with the Utah Grizzlies (2000–01), Hamilton Bulldogs (2001–02), and Augsburger Panther (2002–03). After one season Leeb joined fellow German club, the Nuremberg/Signoret Ice Tigers, where he played for six seasons. For the 2012-2013 Elite Ice Hockey League campaign, Leeb joined the Coventry Blaze. He is now retired.

== Career statistics ==
=== Regular season and playoffs ===
			Regular season					Playoffs
Season	Team	League	GP	G	A	Pts	PIM	GP	G	A	Pts	PIM
1992–93	Red Deer Chiefs	AMBHL	29	14	22	36	10	—	—	—	—	—
1993–94	Red Deer Royals	AMHL	36	19	30	49	24	—	—	—	—	—
1994–95	Spokane Chiefs	WHL	72	21	34	55	48	11	5	10	15	10
1995–96	Spokane Chiefs	WHL	64	33	21	54	54	18	1	7	8	16
1996–97	Spokane Chiefs	WHL	72	27	59	86	69	9	3	3	6	4
1997–98	Spokane Chiefs	WHL	68	46	50	96	54	18	10	10	20	10
1997–98	Spokane Chiefs	M-Cup	—	—	—	—	—	4	3	1	4	0
1998–99	Michigan K-Wings	IHL	77	16	27	43	18	5	0	3	3	4
1999–00	Michigan K-Wings	IHL	73	9	17	26	76	—	—	—	—	—
2000–01	Dallas Stars	NHL	2	0	0	0	0	—	—	—	—	—
2000–01	Utah Grizzlies	IHL	78	25	40	65	36	—	—	—	—	—
2001–02	Hamilton Bulldogs	AHL	79	14	17	31	36	15	0	2	2	6
2002–03	Augsburger Panther	DEL	51	9	22	31	26	—	—	—	—	—
2003–04	Nuremberg Ice Tigers	DEL	51	10	17	27	20	6	4	2	6	2
2004–05	Nuremberg Ice Tigers	DEL	52	14	22	36	30	6	3	4	7	0
2005–06	Nuremberg Ice Tigers	DEL	52	9	20	29	22	4	2	2	4	0
2006–07	Sinupret Ice Tigers	DEL	46	13	21	34	14	13	2	6	8	2
2007–08	Sinupret Ice Tigers	DEL	54	16	20	36	14	5	1	1	2	4
2008–09	Sinupret Ice Tigers	DEL	30	8	8	16	10	5	0	2	2	6
2009–10	Thomas Sabo Ice Tigers	DEL	56	13	23	36	46	5	1	3	4	2
2010–11	Thomas Sabo Ice Tigers	DEL	44	10	14	24	32	—	—	—	—	—
DEL totals			436	102	167	269	224	44	13	20	33	16
NHL totals			2	0	0	0	0	—	—	—	—	—

== Awards and achievements ==
- Named to the WHL West Second All-Star Team in 1998
