= Brent Peterson =

Canadian ice hockey player and coach (1958–2026)

- Peterson in 1988 card
- Born: February 15, 1958 Calgary, Alberta, Canada
- Died: September 11, 2026 (aged 68) Franklin, Tennessee, U.S.
- Height: 6 ft 0 in (183 cm)
- Weight: 190 lb (86 kg; 13 st 8 lb)
- Position: Right wing
- Shot: Right
- Played for: Detroit Red Wings; Buffalo Sabres; Vancouver Canucks; Hartford Whalers
- Coached for: Hartford Whalers (Assistant); Nashville Predators (Assistant); Portland Winterhawks (Head Coach)
- NHL draft: 12th overall, 1978; Detroit Red Wings
- Playing career: 1978–1989
- Coaching career: 1989–2011

Brent Ronald Peterson (February 15, 1958 – September 11, 2026) was a Canadian professional ice hockey player and coach. He played 11 seasons in the National Hockey League (NHL) with four teams, primarily as a low-scoring checker with a reputation as a strong defensive forward. After his playing career ended, he became an assistant coach with the Whalers before later serving as head coach of the Portland Winterhawks, where he won the Memorial Cup in 1998. Peterson soon became an assistant coach with the Nashville Predators, retiring in 2011 for health reasons. He was later an adviser for the team and served on the radio broadcasts for three years.

== Playing career ==
Peterson in postcard for Detroit Red Wings after being drafted in 1978.

After a sterling junior career with the Portland Winter Hawks, Peterson was selected in the first round, 12th overall, of the 1978 NHL Amateur Draft by the Detroit Red Wings. He made Detroit's NHL squad in his first training camp, but he unfortunately saw his season end after only five games due to a broken leg. Recovering from his injury, he spent most of the 1979–80 season in the minors, although he saw 18 games in a Detroit uniform and scored his first NHL goal. In 1980–81, he established himself as an NHL regular, registering 6 goals and 24 points in 53 games.

Early in the 1981–82 season, Peterson was dealt to the Buffalo Sabres in a monster six-player trade centred around Mike Foligno and Danny Gare. In Buffalo, he hit his stride as an NHL player as a key component of one of the best checking lines in the league alongside Craig Ramsay and Ric Seiling. In the following 1982–83 season, he set career highs of 13 goals and 24 assists for 37 points, while establishing himself as a top-notch penalty killer and face-off specialist.

After four years with the Sabres, Peterson was claimed by the Vancouver Canucks in the 1985 NHL Waiver Draft. In the 1985–86 season, he registered 9 goals and 22 assists for 31 points with the Canucks, including a career-high 3 shorthanded goals. His acquisition was a key factor in a 68-goal reduction in the team's goals against from the previous year. In the next season, Peterson recorded 7 goals and 15 assists for 22 points in 69 games for the Canucks.

Peterson was claimed by the Hartford Whalers in the waiver draft on the eve of the 1987–88 season and suffered through the worst year of his career with just 2 goals and 9 points in 52 games. He rebounded to have an improved year in the 1988–89 season, registering 4 goals and 17 points in 66 games for the Whalers while anchoring the top penalty-kill unit alongside Dave Tippett. However, at the conclusion of the season he announced his retirement to accept a coaching position with the Whalers.

He finished his NHL career with totals of 72 goals and 141 assists for 213 points in 620 games, along with 484 penalty minutes. He added 4 goals and 4 assists for 8 points in 31 playoff games.

== Coaching and broadcasting career ==
Following his retirement, Peterson spent two seasons as an assistant coach for the Whalers under head coach Rick Ley. Following Ley's firing in 1991, Peterson returned to the Portland Winter Hawks, his former junior team, to accept a head coaching position there. In Portland, he established himself as one of the top coaches in Canadian junior hockey, winning three division titles in 7 years. His tenure with the Winter Hawks culminated with a dominating 1997–98 season, in which the team posted a 53–14–5 record and ultimately won the WHL Championship and then the Memorial Cup as the top team in Canadian junior.

Following his Memorial Cup championship in 1998, Peterson moved back to the NHL to accept a job as the associate coach to Barry Trotz with the expansion Nashville Predators. He stayed as a coach with the Predators until 2011, despite being considered for head coaching positions at other teams in the NHL.

From 2014 to 2017, Peterson was a member of the Predators' radio team.

== Personal life and death ==
Peterson was a member of the Church of Jesus Christ of Latter-day Saints. Peterson was diagnosed with Parkinson's disease in 2002. Peterson died on September 11, 2026, at the age of 68.

Peterson was the brother of former Canadian Football League defensive back Greg Peterson.

== Career statistics ==
=== Regular season and playoffs ===
			Regular season					Playoffs
Season	Team	League	GP	G	A	Pts	PIM	GP	G	A	Pts	PIM
1973–74	Calgary Royals	AAHA	—	—	—	—	—	—	—	—	—	—
1974–75	Edmonton Oil Kings	WCHL	66	17	26	43	44	—	—	—	—	—
1975–76	Edmonton Oil Kings	WCHL	70	22	39	61	57	5	4	2	6	7
1976–77	Portland Winterhawks	WCHL	69	34	78	112	98	10	3	8	11	8
1977–78	Portland Winterhawks	WCHL	51	33	50	83	95	3	1	1	2	2
1978–79	Detroit Red Wings	NHL	5	0	0	0	0	—	—	—	—	—
1979–80	Adirondack Red Wings	AHL	52	9	22	31	61	5	0	0	0	6
1979–80	Detroit Red Wings	NHL	18	1	2	3	2	—	—	—	—	—
1980–81	Adirondack Red Wings	AHL	3	1	0	1	10	—	—	—	—	—
1980–81	Detroit Red Wings	NHL	53	6	18	24	24	—	—	—	—	—
1981–82	Detroit Red Wings	NHL	15	1	0	1	6	—	—	—	—	—
1981–82	Buffalo Sabres	NHL	46	9	5	14	43	4	1	0	1	12
1982–83	Buffalo Sabres	NHL	75	13	24	37	38	10	1	2	3	28
1983–84	Buffalo Sabres	NHL	70	9	12	21	52	3	0	1	1	4
1984–85	Buffalo Sabres	NHL	74	12	22	34	47	5	0	0	0	6
1985–86	Vancouver Canucks	NHL	77	8	23	31	94	3	2	0	2	9
1986–87	Vancouver Canucks	NHL	69	7	15	22	77	—	—	—	—	—
1987–88	Hartford Whalers	NHL	52	2	7	9	40	4	0	0	0	2
1988–89	Hartford Whalers	NHL	66	4	13	17	61	2	0	1	1	4
NHL totals			620	72	141	213	484	31	4	4	8	65

== Awards and honours ==
Award	Year
WHL
Memorial Cup Champion (Coach - Portland Winter Hawks)	1998
Inducted into Portland Winter Hawks Hall of Fame	2012
