= 1997–98 WHL season =

Junior ice hockey season

- League: Western Hockey League
- Sport: Ice hockey
- Teams: 18

Regular season
- Scotty Munro Memorial Trophy: Portland Winter Hawks (2)
- Season MVP: Sergei Varlamov (Swift Current Broncos)
- Top scorer: Sergei Varlamov (Swift Current Broncos)

Playoffs
- Playoffs MVP: Brent Belecki (Winter Hawks)
- Finals champions: Portland Winter Hawks (2)
- Runners-up: Brandon Wheat Kings

WHL seasons
- 1996–97 1998–99

1997–98 CHL season
- League: Canadian Hockey League
- Sport: Ice hockey
- Teams: 51

OHL

QMJHL

WHL

Memorial Cup
- Finals champions: Portland Winter Hawks (WHL) (2nd title)
- Runners-up: Guelph Storm (OHL)

The 1997–98 WHL season was the 32nd season of the Western Hockey League (WHL). The season featured eighteen teams and a 72-game season. The Portland Winter Hawks won both the Scotty Munro Memorial Trophy as regular season champions and the President's Cup as playoff champions before going on to win the 1998 Memorial Cup, which was hosted by the Spokane Chiefs.

== Regular season ==
Map of WHL, 1996–97 to 1997–98
East Division
Central Division
West Division

=== Final standings ===
East Division
Pos	Team	Pld	W	L	T	GF	GA	Pts
1	x – Regina Pats	72	46	21	5	334	250	97
2	x – Swift Current Broncos	72	44	19	9	276	220	97
3	x – Brandon Wheat Kings	72	45	21	6	322	235	96
4	x – Saskatoon Blades	72	25	39	8	263	327	58
5	x – Moose Jaw Warriors	72	23	39	10	235	281	56
6	Prince Albert Raiders	72	20	47	5	222	288	45

x – qualified for playoffs

Central Division
Pos	Team	Pld	W	L	T	GF	GA	Pts
1	x – Calgary Hitmen	72	40	28	4	265	232	84
2	x – Lethbridge Hurricanes	72	32	29	11	261	237	75
3	x – Red Deer Rebels	72	27	40	5	281	323	59
4	Edmonton Ice	72	17	49	6	242	328	40
5	Medicine Hat Tigers	72	16	50	6	188	340	38

x – qualified for playoffs

West Division
Pos	Team	Pld	W	L	T	GF	GA	Pts
1	x – Portland Winter Hawks	72	53	14	5	342	203	111
2	x – Spokane Chiefs	72	45	23	4	288	235	94
3	x – Prince George Cougars	72	43	24	5	311	236	91
4	x – Kamloops Blazers	72	37	32	3	234	253	77
5	x – Kelowna Rockets	72	33	35	4	313	290	70
6	x – Seattle Thunderbirds	72	31	35	6	286	278	68
7	Tri-City Americans	72	17	49	6	264	371	40

x – qualified for playoffs

=== Scoring leaders ===
Note: GP = Games played; G = Goals; A = Assists; Pts = Points; PIM = Penalties in minutes

Player	Team	GP	G	A	Pts	PIM
Serhiy Varlamov	Swift Current Broncos	72	66	53	119	132
Cory Cyrenne	Brandon Wheat Kings	72	47	71	118	28
Ronald Petrovicky	Regina Pats	71	64	49	113	178
Shane Willis	Lethbridge Hurricanes	64	58	54	112	73
Quinn Hancock	Prince George Cougars	69	54	58	112	31
Shawn McNeil	Red Deer Rebels	72	47	62	109	69
Mark Smith	Lethbridge Hurricanes	70	42	67	109	206
Todd Robinson	Portland Winter Hawks	71	35	74	109	55
Jason Deleurme	Kelowna Rockets	72	51	52	103	47
Brad Moran	Calgary Hitmen	72	53	49	102	64

=== Goaltending leaders ===
Note: GP = Games played; Min = Minutes played; W = Wins; L = Losses; T = Ties; GA = Goals against; SO = Total shutouts; SV% = Save percentage; GAA = Goals against average

Player	Team	GP	Min	W	L	T	GA	SO	SV%	GAA
Brent Belecki	Portland Winter Hawks	51	3052	35	10	5	131	2	.918	2.58
Terry Friesen	Swift Current Broncos	44	2640	26	10	7	124	1	.907	2.82
Scott Myers	Prince George Cougars	48	2823	29	13	4	139	2	.900	2.95
Alexandre Fomitchev	Calgary Hitmen	60	3383	32	23	1	168	1	.898	2.98
Ryan Hoople	Lethbridge/Regina	58	3266	34	18	4	164	4	.899	3.01

== 1998 WHL Playoffs ==
- Top eight teams in the Eastern Conference (East and Central divisions) qualified for playoffs
- Top six teams in the Western Conference (division) qualified for the playoffs

First round
C1	Calgary	4
E4	Saskatoon	2
E2	Swift Current	4
C3	Red Deer	1
E1	Regina	4
E5	Moose Jaw	0
E3	Brandon	4
C2	Lethbridge	0
W1	Portland	4
W6	Seattle	1
W2	Spokane	4
W5	Kelowna	3
W3	Prince George	4
W4	Kamloops	3

Division Semi-Finals
C1	Calgary	4
E2	Swift Current	3
E1	Regina	1
E3	Brandon	4
W1	Portland	bye
W2	Spokane	3
W3	Prince George	1

Division Finals
C1	Calgary	1
E3	Brandon	4
W1	Portland	4
W2	Spokane	3

WHL Championship
E3	Brandon	0
W1	Portland	4

=== Conference quarterfinals ===
==== Eastern Conference ====
Regina vs. Moose Jaw
Date	Away	Home	
March 19	Moose Jaw 0	7 Regina	
March 20	Moose Jaw 1	2 Regina	
March 22	Regina 4	3 Moose Jaw	2OT
March 23	Regina 6	5 Moose Jaw	2OT
Regina wins series 4–0

Calgary vs. Saskatoon
Date	Away	Home
March 17	Calgary 3	0 Saskatoon
March 19	Saskatoon 4	1 Calgary
March 22	Saskatoon 1	3 Calgary
March 24	Calgary 1	6 Saskatoon
March 25	Saskatoon 2	3 Calgary
March 27	Calgary 3	2 Saskatoon
Calgary wins series 4–2

Brandon vs. Lethbridge
Date	Away	Home
March 18	Lethbridge 3	5 Brandon
March 20	Lethbridge 3	6 Brandon
March 22	Brandon 7	3 Lethbridge
March 23	Brandon 4	1 Lethbridge
Brandon wins series 4–0

Swift Current vs. Red Deer
Date	Away	Home	
March 19	Red Deer 0	3 Swift Current	
March 20	Red Deer 3	4 Swift Current	OT
March 22	Swift Current 3	4 Red Deer	
March 23	Swift Current 3	2 Red Deer	
March 29	Red Deer 2	5 Swift Current	
Swift Current wins series 4–1

==== Western Conference ====
Spokane vs. Kelowna
Date	Away	Home	
March 21	Spokane 4	6 Kelowna	
March 24	Kelowna 3	4 Spokane	OT
March 25	Spokane 2	5 Kelowna	
April 27	Kelowna 2	6 Spokane	
March 29	Kelowna 6	3 Spokane	
March 31	Spokane 2	0 Kelowna	
April 1	Kelowna 1	5 Spokane	
Spokane wins series 4–3

Prince George vs. Kamloops
Date	Away	Home
March 20	Kamloops 2	1 Prince George
March 21	Kamloops 0	6 Prince George
March 24	Prince George 3	5 Kamloops
March 25	Prince George 1	2 Kamloops
March 27	Kamloops 1	4 Prince George
March 29	Prince George 4	3 Kamloops
March 31	Kamloops 1	2 Prince George
Prince George wins series 4–3

Portland vs. Seattle
Date	Away	Home
March 20	Seattle 3	7 Portland
March 21	Portland 1	3 Seattle
March 22	Seattle 1	5 Portland
March 26	Portland 5	2 Seattle
March 27	Seattle 2	3 Portland
Portland wins series 4–1

=== Conference semifinals ===
Eastern Conference

Calgary vs. Swift Current
Date	Away	Home	
March 30	Swift Current 2	5 Calgary	
April 1	Calgary 2	3 Swift Current	2OT
April 2	Calgary 1	5 Swift Current	
April 4	Swift Current 5	2 Calgary	
April 6	Swift Current 2	3 Calgary	
April 7	Calgary 4	1 Swift Current	
April 8	Swift Current 0	1 Calgary	
Calgary wins series 4–3

Regina vs. Brandon
Date	Away	Home
March 30	Brandon 4	2 Regina
March 31	Brandon 2	5 Regina
April 2	Regina 1	6 Brandon
April 4	Regina 3	5 Brandon
April 6	Brandon 7	3 Regina
Brandon wins series 4–1

Western Conference

Spokane vs. Prince George
Date	Away	Home
April 3	Prince George 3	0 Spokane
April 5	Prince George 1	4 Spokane
April 7	Spokane 4	2 Prince George
April 8	Spokane 5	2 Prince George
Spokane wins series 3–1

Portland earns bye

=== Conference finals ===
Eastern Conference

Calgary vs. Brandon
Date	Away	Home	
April 11	Brandon 5	4 Calgary	
April 12	Brandon 5	4 Calgary	
April 14	Calgary 3	2 Brandon	OT
April 15	Calgary 1	4 Brandon	
April 17	Brandon 4	1 Calgary	
Brandon wins series 4–1

Western Conference

Portland vs. Spokane
Date	Away	Home
April 11	Spokane 6	3 Portland
April 13	Spokane 0	2 Portland
April 15	Portland 4	1 Spokane
April 16	Portland 3	5 Spokane
April 18	Spokane 2	9 Portland
April 21	Portland 2	5 Spokane
April 22	Spokane 2	3 Portland
Portland wins series 4–3

=== WHL Championship ===
Portland vs. Brandon
Date	Away	Home
April 25	Brandon 3	7 Portland
April 26	Brandon 1	5 Portland
April 29	Portland 7	2 Brandon
May 1	Portland 4	3 Brandon
Portland wins series 4–0

== All-Star Game ==
On January 21, the Western Conference defeated the Eastern Conference 7–6 at Regina, Saskatchewan before a crowd of 6,050. The match was refereed by future National Hockey League official Mike Hasenfratz.

== WHL awards ==
Player of the Year - Four Broncos Memorial Trophy: Sergei Varlamov, Swift Current Broncos
Scholastic Player of the Year - Daryl K. (Doc) Seaman Trophy: Kyle Rossiter, Spokane Chiefs
Top Scorer - Bob Clarke Trophy: Sergei Varlamov, Swift Current Broncos
Most Sportsmanlike Player - Brad Hornung Trophy: Cory Cyrenne, Brandon Wheat Kings
Top Defenseman - Bill Hunter Trophy: Michal Rozsival, Swift Current Broncos
Rookie of the Year - Jim Piggott Memorial Trophy: Marian Hossa, Portland Winter Hawks
Top Goaltender - Del Wilson Trophy: Brent Belecki, Portland Winter Hawks
Coach of the Year - Dunc McCallum Memorial Trophy: Dean Clark, Calgary Hitmen
Executive of the Year - Lloyd Saunders Memorial Trophy: Ken Hodge, Portland Winter Hawks
Regular season champions - Scotty Munro Memorial Trophy: Portland Winter Hawks
Top Official - Allen Paradice Memorial Trophy: Brad Meier
Marketing/Public Relations Award - St. Clair Group Trophy: Dane MacKinnon, Prince George Cougars
WHL Humanitarian of the Year: Jesse Wallin, Red Deer Rebels
WHL Plus-Minus Award: Andrew Ference, Portland Winter Hawks
WHL Playoff Most Valuable Player: Brent Belecki, Portland Winter Hawks

== All-Star teams ==
Eastern Conference
	First Team		Second Team	
Goal	Terry Friesen	Swift Current Broncos	Evan Lindsay	Prince Albert Raiders
Defense	Michal Rozsíval	Swift Current Broncos	Johnathan Aitken	Brandon Wheat Kings
Defense	Burke Henry	Brandon Wheat Kings	Brad Stuart	Regina Pats
Forward	Sergei Varlamov	Swift Current Broncos	Josh Holden	Regina Pats
Forward	Shane Willis	Lethbridge Hurricanes	Ronald Petrovicky	Regina Pats
Forward	Cory Cyrenne	Brandon Wheat Kings	Mark Smith	Lethbridge Hurricanes
Western Conference
	First Team		Second Team	
Goal	Brent Belecki	Portland Winter Hawks	Randy Petruk	Kamloops Blazers
Defense	Joel Kwiatkowski	Prince George Cougars	Eric Brewer	Prince George Cougars
Defense	Andrew Ference	Portland Winter Hawks	Cory Sarich	Seattle Thunderbirds
Forward	Quinn Hancock	Prince George Cougars	Jason Deleurme	Kelowna Rockets
Forward	Marián Hossa	Portland Winter Hawks	Greg Leeb	Spokane Chiefs
Forward	Mark Parrish	Seattle Thunderbirds	Brett McLean	Kelowna Rockets
Forward	-	-	Todd Robinson	Portland Winter Hawks
Forward	-	-	Trent Whitfield	Spokane Chiefs

== See also ==
- 1998 Memorial Cup
- 1998 NHL entry draft
- 1997 in sports
- 1998 in sports

Preceded by 1996–97 WHL season	WHL seasons	Succeeded by 1998–99 WHL season
