= Cory Cyrenne =

Canadian ice hockey player (born 1977)

- Born: August 25, 1977 (age 49) Winnipeg, Manitoba, Canada
- Height: 5 ft 9 in (175 cm)
- Weight: 185 lb (84 kg; 13 st 3 lb)
- Position: Centre
- Shot: Left
- NHL draft: 191st overall, 1996; San Jose Sharks
- Playing career: 1998–2004

Cory Cyrenne (born August 25, 1977) is a Canadian former professional ice hockey player. He was named the Canadian Junior A Hockey Player of the Year in 1995 and received a hockey scholarship to Colorado College. He was also named the CHL's Sportsmanlike player of the year in 1998.

Cyrenne played junior hockey with the Brandon Wheat Kings of the WHL. He was drafted 191st overall by the San Jose Sharks in the 1996 NHL Entry Draft. He attended the Sharks 1997 training camp, but was returned to Brandon, where he was the league's second-leading scorer in 1997–98.

Cyrenne played professionally in several leagues, including the IHL and AHL.

== Off the ice ==
Cyrenne retired in 2004, and was initially employed by the True North Sports & Entertainment, the parent company of his former team, the Manitoba Moose. Cyrenne currently resides in Winnipeg with his wife Tara and three daughters. He was employed by RBC as an Account Manager before deciding to upgrade his accreditations and is now employed as an accredited Financial Planner with RBC Financial Planning.

== Career statistics ==
                                  Regular season
Season  Team                    Lge   GP   G   A    Pts  PIM

1993-94 St. Boniface Saints     MJHL  52  26  38     64   24   
1994-95 St. Boniface Saints     MJHL  54  35  77    112   66
1995-96 Brandon Wheat Kings     WHL   69  38  59     97   58
1996-97 Brandon Wheat Kings     WHL   55  26  56     82   23
1997-98 Brandon Wheat Kings     WHL   72  47  71    118   28 
1998-99 Louisiana IceGators     ECHL  21   6   9     15    6
1998-99 Manitoba Moose          IHL   46   4  14     18   18
1999-00 Flint Generals          UHL   19  12  22     34   10 
1999-00 Manitoba Moose          IHL   30   5   9     14   13
2000-01 Memphis Riverkings      CHL   52  33  46     79   24
2000-01 Manitoba Moose          IHL   15   2   5      7    8
2001-02 Louisiana IceGators     ECHL  66  27  50     77   50
2001-02 Houston Aeros           AHL    7   0   2      2    0
2002-03 Lustenau EHC            Aust  10   2   5      7   15      
2002-03 San Diego Gulls         WCHL  42  13  36     49   32
2003-04 Appiano                 Italy 21   3  12     15   18

== Awards and achievements ==
- MJHL Rookie of Year (1994)
- MJHL First All-Star Team (1995)
- MJHL Scoring Champion (1995)
- MJHL Most Valuable Player (1995)
- He was named Canada's Junior A Player of the Year in 1995
- Named to the WHL East First All-Star Team in 1998
- He was named the Canadian Hockey League's Sportsmanlike Player of the Year in 1998
