= Brent Belecki =

Canadian ice hockey player

- Born: December 22, 1977 (age 48) Calgary, Alberta, Canada
- Height: 5 ft 9 in (175 cm)
- Weight: 175 lb (79 kg; 12 st 7 lb)
- Position: Goaltender
- Caught: Left
- UHL team Former teams: Retired; Richmond Riverdogs; Muskegon Fury; Austin Ice Bats; Fort Worth Brahmas; Corpus Christi Rayz; Corpus Christi IceRays; Utah Grizzlies; San Antonio Iguanas; Asheville Smoke; Huntsville Channel Cats; Hampton Roads Admirals; Huntington Blizzard; Charlotte Checkers; Greensboro Generals; Miami Matadors
- NHL draft: undrafted
- Playing career: 1998–2005

Brent Belecki (born December 22, 1977, in Calgary, Alberta) is a former professional ice hockey goaltender who played in the Western Hockey League, East Coast Hockey League, Central Hockey League, United Hockey League, and American Hockey League.

In the 1997–1998, as a junior, he won the WHL's top goaltender award and the WHL playoff Most Valuable Player award. Belecki backstopped the Portland Winter Hawks to the CHL's highest honor, the 1998 Memorial Cup. However, due to his small size (5-9, 175 lbs), Belecki was never drafted by a National Hockey League team.

As a professional, Belecki played for teams including the Miami Matadors, the Huntsville Channel Cats, the Asheville Smoke, the San Antonio Iguanas, the Utah Grizzlies, the Corpus Christi Rayz, the Austin Ice Bats, and the Muskegon Fury.

== Awards and achievements ==
- Named to the WHL West First All-Star Team in 1998
