= 1998 Memorial Cup =

Canadian junior men's ice hockey championship

Tournament details
- Venue(s): Spokane Veterans Memorial Arena; Spokane, Washington
- Dates: May 9–17, 1998
- Teams: 4
- Host team: Spokane Chiefs (WHL)
- TV partner: TSN

Final positions
- Champions: Portland Winter Hawks (WHL) (2nd title)

Tournament statistics
- Games played: 8

The Memorial Cup trophy

The 1998 Memorial Cup (branded as the 1998 Chrysler Memorial Cup for sponsorship reasons) occurred May 9–17 at the Spokane Veterans Memorial Arena in Spokane, Washington. It was the 80th annual Memorial Cup competition and determined the major junior ice hockey champion of the Canadian Hockey League (CHL). Participating teams were the host Spokane Chiefs and the winners of the Ontario Hockey League, Quebec Major Junior Hockey League and Western Hockey League which were the Guelph Storm, Val-d'Or Foreurs and Portland Winter Hawks. The Winter Hawks won their second Memorial Cup defeating the Storm from a goal in overtime by Bobby Russell.

The tournament set a new Memorial Cup attendance record, though that record was broken the following year in Ottawa. This was the first Memorial Cup to feature two American teams (Spokane and Portland), both representing the WHL.

== Round-robin standings ==
Pos	Team	Pld	W	L	GF	GA
1	Portland Winter Hawks (WHL)	3	3	0	17	8
2	Guelph Storm (OHL)	3	2	1	12	7
3	Spokane Chiefs (host)	3	1	2	8	11
4	Val-d'Or Foreurs (QMJHL)	3	0	3	8	19

== Scores ==
Round-robin

- May 9 Spokane 5, Val-d'Or 4
- May 10 Portland 6, Guelph 2
- May 11 Guelph 3, Spokane 1
- May 12 Portland 7, Val-d'Or 4
- May 13 Guelph 7, Val-d'Or 0
- May 14 Portland 4, Spokane 2

Semi-final

- May 16 Guelph 2, Spokane 1 (OT)

Final

- May 17 Portland 4, Guelph 3 (OT)

=== Winning roster ===
1997-98 Portland Winter Hawks
Goaltenders: – Justin Morneau; 1 – Brent Belecki; 35 – Jason LaBarbera	Defencemen: – Christian Bolding; 2 – Shon Jones-Parry; 3 – Kevin Haupt; 4 – Ryan Thrussell; 6 – Jerad Smith; 22 – Mike Muzechka; 34 – Matt Walker; 44 – Andrew Ference; 55 – Joey Tetarenko - C	Wingers: – Shane Palahicky; 8 – Marty Standish; 9 – Derek MacLean; 16 – Mike Hurley; 17 – Gerry King; 18 – Marian Hossa; 21 – Bobby Russell; 23 – Ken Davis; 25 – Kyle Chant; 27 – Ryan Kehrig; 29 – Brenden Morrow	Centres: 12 – Todd Hornung; 14 – Andrej Podkonicky; 19 – Todd Robinson; 27 – Blake Robson; 39 – Chris Jacobson; Coach: Brent Peterson; General Manager: Ken Hodge

== Scoring leaders ==
1. Andrej Podkonicky, POR, (6g 4a) 10p
2. Marian Hossa, POR, (5g 4a) 9p
3. Manny Malhotra, GUE, (1g 6a) 7p
4. Bobby Russell, POR, (4g 2a) 6p
5. Mike Hurley, POR, (0g 6a) 6p
6. Jean-Pierre Dumont, VAL, (3g 2a) 5p
7. Todd Robinson, POR, (1g 4a) 5p
8. Greg Leeb, SPO, (3g 1a) 4p
9. Jason Jackman, GUE, (2g 2a) 4p
10. Kent McDonnell, GUE, (2g 2a) 4p
11. Ryan Davis, GUE, (2g 2a) 4p
12. Perry Johnson, SPO (1g 3a) 4p
13. Marian Cisar, SPO (0g 4a) 4p
14. Kevin Haupt, POR, (0g 4a) 4p

== Goaltending leaders ==
1. Chris Madden, GUE, 2.21 GAA, .947 pct
2. Brent Belecki, POR, 2.68 GAA, .916 pct
3. David Haun, SPO, 2.93 GAA, .885 pct
4. Roberto Luongo, VAL, 6.33 GAA, .857 pct

== Award winners ==
- Stafford Smythe Memorial Trophy (MVP): Chris Madden, Guelph
- George Parsons Trophy (Sportsmanship): Manny Malhotra, Guelph
- Hap Emms Memorial Trophy (Goaltender): Chris Madden, Guelph
- Ed Chynoweth Trophy (Top Scorer): Andrej Podkonicky, Portland

All-star team

- Goal: Chris Madden, Guelph
- Defence: Brad Ference, Spokane; Francis Lessard, Val d'Or
- Forward: Andrej Podkonicky, Portland; Manny Malholtra, Guelph; Marian Hossa, Portland
