= Kevin Swanson (ice hockey) =

Canadian ice hockey player

- Born: May 18, 1980 (age 45) Alberta, Canada
- Height: 5 ft 9 in (175 cm)
- Weight: 181 lb (82 kg; 12 st 13 lb)
- Position: Goaltender
- Caught: Left
- Played for: AHL; Manitoba Moose; ECHL; Columbia Inferno
- NHL draft: 189th overall, 1999; Vancouver Canucks
- Playing career: 2001–2003

Kevin Swanson (born April 18, 1980) is a Canadian ice hockey coach and former goaltender.

== Early life ==
Swanson played major junior hockey in the WHL with the Prince George Cougars and Kelowna Rockets. He was named to the 1999–2000 WHL West First All-Star Team after playing 68 games for the Rockets, to post a 25-40-3 record with seven shutouts and a 2.95 goals against average.

== Career ==
Swanson was selected by the Vancouver Canucks in the seventh round (189th overall) of the 1999 NHL entry draft. He played in the American Hockey League for the Manitoba Moose and in the ECHL for the Columbia Inferno. Since retiring as a player, Swanson has worked as a goaltending coach with the Lethbridge Hurricanes of the Western Hockey League (WHL).

== Awards and honours ==
Award	Year
WHL West First Team All-Star	1999–2000
WHL West Second Team All-Star	2000–01
