= Trent Hunter =

Canadian ice hockey player (born 1980)

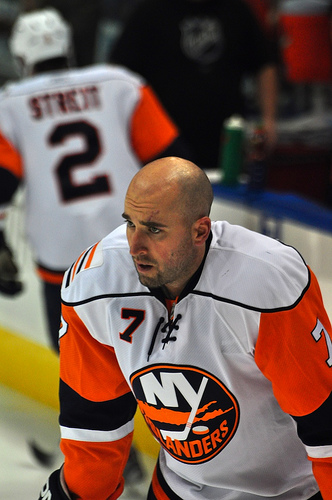
- Hunter with the New York Islanders in 2008
- Born: June 5, 1980 (age 46) Red Deer, Alberta, Canada
- Height: 6 ft 3 in (191 cm)
- Weight: 210 lb (95 kg; 15 st 0 lb)
- Position: Right wing
- Shot: Right
- Played for: New York Islanders; Los Angeles Kings
- NHL draft: 150th overall, 1998; Mighty Ducks of Anaheim
- Playing career: 2000–2012

Trent Hunter (born June 5, 1980) is a Canadian former professional ice hockey right winger. He played for the New York Islanders and Los Angeles Kings of the National Hockey League (NHL).

== Playing career ==
Originally drafted in the sixth round, 150th overall, of the 1998 NHL entry draft by the Mighty Ducks of Anaheim, Hunter was traded to the New York Islanders in exchange for a fourth-round draft pick in the 2000 NHL entry draft. He set franchise records for the Bridgeport Sound Tigers of the American Hockey League (AHL) in all three scoring categories (30 goals, 35 assists and 65 points). He made his NHL debut in the 2002 Stanley Cup playoffs, scoring one goal and one assist in four games.

Hunter broke into the NHL full-time with the Islanders in 2003–04 and was tied for first on the team in goals (25, with Mariusz Czerkawski) and tied for total points (51, with Oleg Kvasha). He finished third in voting for the Calder Memorial Trophy in 2004, losing to goaltender Andrew Raycroft of the Boston Bruins.

During the 2004–05 NHL lockout, Hunter played in Nyköpings Hockey in the Swedish HockeyAllsvenskan, becoming an instant hit with the club's fans for his NHL skills and aggressive play. The most influential player in the squad, Hunter came close to leading the unfancied club to promotion, leading the side to a sensational 5–4 victory against multiple Swedish champions Brynäs IF away from home in the playoffs. In the end, a defeat in the return leg ended Nyköping's hopes.

On July 28, 2011, Hunter was traded to the New Jersey Devils in exchange for winger Brian Rolston. Traded to the Devils for salary cap purposes, on August 1, 2011, Hunter was placed on waivers by the Devils along with Colin White. He was then bought out from the final two years of his contract on August 2 after clearing.

On September 14, 2011 it was announced that Hunter would sign a professional tryout contract with the Los Angeles Kings to attend the pre-season camp for the 2011–12 campaign. He was then signed to a one-year contract with the Kings on September 30, 2011. After producing only 7 points in 38 games with the Kings, he was cleared from waivers and reassigned to their AHL affiliate, the Manchester Monarchs, for the remainder of the season.

== Career statistics ==
=== Regular season and playoffs ===
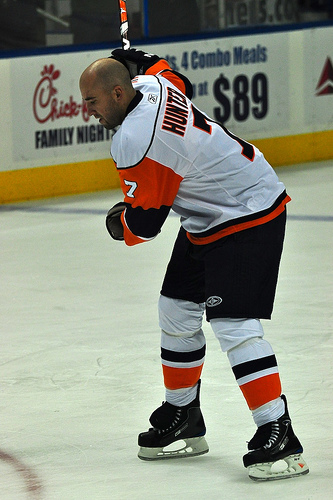
Hunter, playing for the New York Islanders.

| | | | Regular season | | | | | Playoffs |
| Season | Team | League | GP | G | A | Pts | PIM | GP | G | A | Pts | PIM |
|---|---|---|---|---|---|---|---|---|---|---|---|---|
| 1996–97 | Red Deer Chiefs | AMHL | 42 | 30 | 25 | 55 | 50 | — | — | — | — | — |
| 1997–98 | Prince George Cougars | WHL | 60 | 13 | 14 | 27 | 34 | 8 | 1 | 0 | 1 | 4 |
| 1998–99 | Prince George Cougars | WHL | 50 | 18 | 20 | 38 | 34 | 7 | 2 | 5 | 7 | 2 |
| 1999–00 | Prince George Cougars | WHL | 67 | 46 | 49 | 95 | 47 | 13 | 7 | 15 | 22 | 6 |
| 2000–01 | Springfield Falcons | AHL | 57 | 18 | 17 | 35 | 14 | — | — | — | — | — |
| 2001–02 | Bridgeport Sound Tigers | AHL | 80 | 30 | 35 | 65 | 30 | 17 | 8 | 11 | 19 | 6 |
| 2001–02 | New York Islanders | NHL | — | — | — | — | — | 4 | 1 | 1 | 2 | 2 |
| 2002–03 | Bridgeport Sound Tigers | AHL | 70 | 30 | 41 | 71 | 39 | 9 | 7 | 4 | 11 | 10 |
| 2002–03 | New York Islanders | NHL | 8 | 0 | 4 | 4 | 4 | — | — | — | — | — |
| 2003–04 | New York Islanders | NHL | 77 | 25 | 26 | 51 | 16 | 4 | 0 | 0 | 0 | 4 |
| 2004–05 | Nykopings Hockey | Swe.1 | 33 | 13 | 12 | 25 | 73 | 4 | 5 | 3 | 8 | 2 |
| 2005–06 | New York Islanders | NHL | 82 | 16 | 19 | 35 | 34 | — | — | — | — | — |
| 2006–07 | New York Islanders | NHL | 77 | 20 | 15 | 35 | 22 | 5 | 3 | 0 | 3 | 0 |
| 2007–08 | New York Islanders | NHL | 82 | 12 | 29 | 41 | 43 | — | — | — | — | — |
| 2008–09 | New York Islanders | NHL | 55 | 14 | 17 | 31 | 41 | — | — | — | — | — |
| 2009–10 | New York Islanders | NHL | 61 | 11 | 17 | 28 | 18 | — | — | — | — | — |
| 2010–11 | New York Islanders | NHL | 17 | 1 | 3 | 4 | 23 | — | — | — | — | — |
| 2011–12 | Los Angeles Kings | NHL | 38 | 2 | 5 | 7 | 8 | — | — | — | — | — |
| 2011–12 | Manchester Monarchs | AHL | 20 | 4 | 6 | 10 | 8 | 4 | 0 | 1 | 1 | 0 |
| NHL totals | | | 497 | 101 | 135 | 236 | 209 | 14 | 4 | 1 | 5 | 6 |

== Awards and achievements ==
- 1999–2000, WHL West First All-Star Team
- 2006–2007, Bob Nystrom Award
