= Alex Burrows =

Canadian ice hockey player (born 1981)

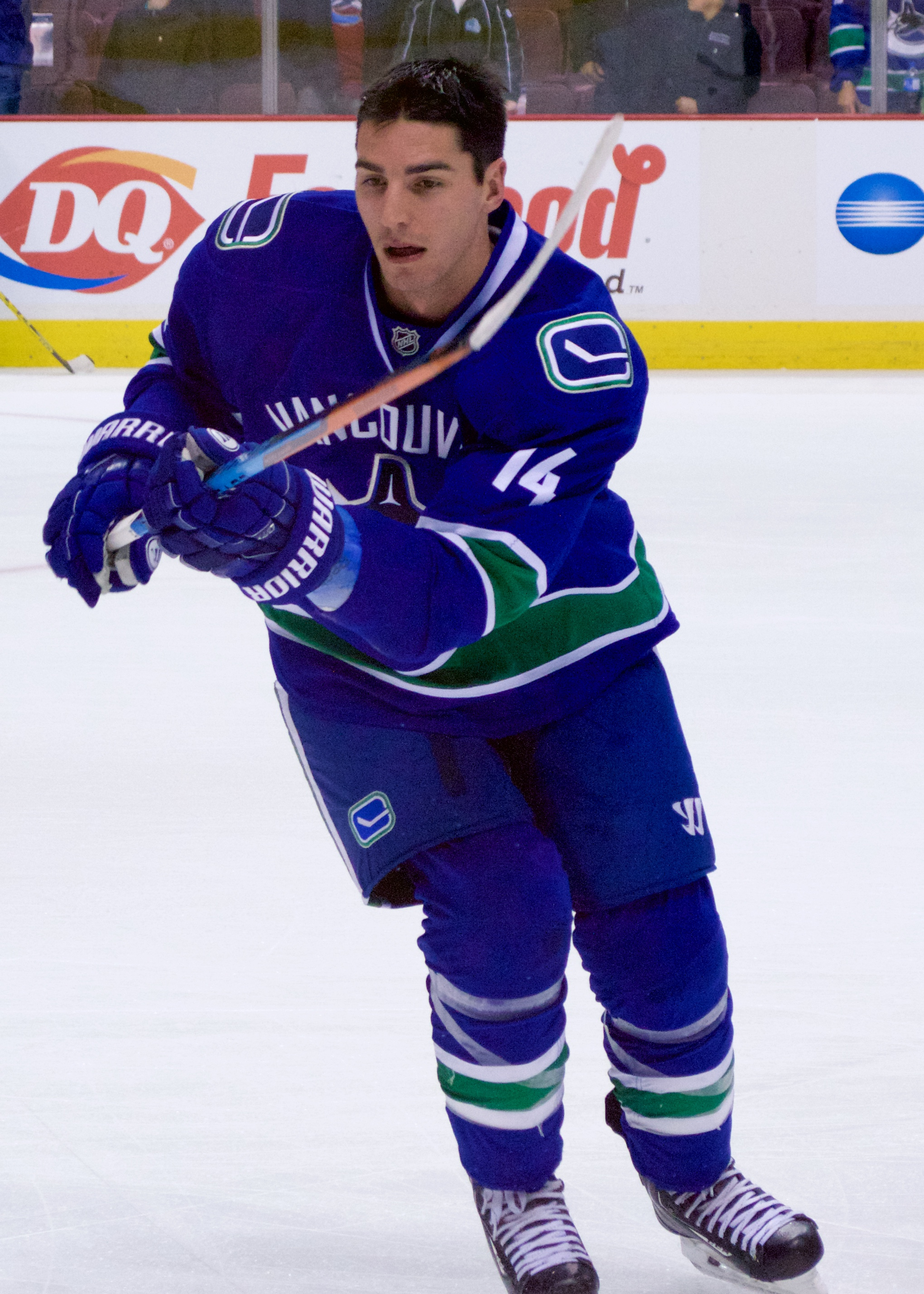
- Burrows with the Vancouver Canucks in October 2015
- Born: April 11, 1981 (age 45) Pincourt, Quebec, Canada
- Height: 6 ft 1 in (185 cm)
- Weight: 197 lb (89 kg; 14 st 1 lb)
- Position: Left wing
- Shot: Left
- Played for: Vancouver Canucks; Ottawa Senators
- National team: Canada
- NHL draft: Undrafted
- Playing career: 2002–2018
Medal record
Representing Canada
Ball hockey
World Championships
Gold medal – first place	2003 Switzerland
Gold medal – first place	2005 United States

Alexandre Ménard-Burrows (born April 11, 1981) is a Canadian professional ice hockey coach and former player who is currently working as a player development consultant for the Montreal Canadiens of the National Hockey League (NHL). Playing as a left winger, he spent the majority of his career in the NHL with the Vancouver Canucks and was known as an agitator, before developing into a skilled, top line fixture. Burrows is also regarded for his remarkable ascension to the NHL from being an undrafted player in the ECHL.

Before making it to the NHL, Burrows also enjoyed a prolific ball hockey career, competing in national and international tournaments in the summers. In 2005, he was named the International Ball Hockey Player of the Year. He has also been inducted into the Canadian and International Ball Hockey Hall of Fame.

== Playing career ==
=== Junior and minor leagues ===
As a youth, Burrows played in the 1995 Quebec International Pee-Wee Hockey Tournament with a minor ice hockey team from La Presqu'île, near Montreal.

Burrows played two seasons in the Quebec Major Junior Hockey League (QMJHL) with the Shawinigan Cataractes, beginning in 2000–01. He recorded 16 goals and 30 points over 63 regular season games, then added three points over 10 post-season games. The following season, he improved to 35 goals and 70 points over 64 games, third in team-scoring, behind Jonathan Bellemare and Jason Pominville. He went on to lead his team in post-season scoring with nine goals and 21 points in 12 games as the Cataractes advanced to the Conference Finals, where they were eliminated in seven games by the Victoriaville Tigres.

Undrafted by a National Hockey League (NHL) club, Burrows went professional in 2002–03 with the Greenville Grrrowl of the ECHL, a third-tier minor league. Late in his professional rookie season, he transferred to the Baton Rouge Kingfish and finished with a combined 32 points in 66 games between the two teams. The following season, in 2003–04, he returned to the South Division, as he was signed by the Columbia Inferno. Early in the season, he was signed by Columbia's American Hockey League (AHL) affiliate, the Manitoba Moose, on October 21, 2003, having been scouted by Moose general manager Craig Heisinger. He appeared in two AHL games for Manitoba before being sent back down to the ECHL. Shortly after his return, he was suspended for three games and fined an undisclosed amount by the league for abusing officials during a game on October 24 against the Greensboro Generals. Later on in the season, he was named to the 2004 ECHL All-Star Game for the Eastern Conference and recorded one assist. He went on to finish the season with 29 goals and 73 points, second in points among Columbia players to league-scoring champion Tim Smith.

In the subsequent off-season, Burrows was re-signed by the Moose on August 3, 2004. He was initially sent back down to the ECHL after a training camp both he and head coach Randy Carlyle described as disappointing. Following an injury to Wade Brookbank, he was recalled on October 29, 2004. He scored his first AHL goal with the Moose five days later, a game-winning goal against goaltender David LeNeveu of the Utah Grizzlies in a 2–1 win. He finished the 2004–05 season with Manitoba and posted 26 points over 72 games in a fourth-line role.

=== Professional (2005–2018) ===
==== Vancouver Canucks (2005–2017) ====
Having worked his way up from the ECHL, Burrows' energetic play in the minors earned him a two-way contract (Note: A player's salary on a two-way contract is dependent on whether he plays in the minor leagues or the NHL.) with the Moose's NHL affiliate, the Vancouver Canucks, on November 8, 2005. He had appeared earlier in the Canucks' training camp for the 2005–06 season, but was sent back to the Moose. After recording 30 points in 33 games with the Moose, he was recalled by the Canucks on January 2, 2006 and made his NHL debut that day against the St. Louis Blues. Eight days later, Burrows scored his first career NHL goal against Ed Belfour of the Toronto Maple Leafs. He also added an assist as the Canucks won the game 4–3. Establishing himself on the Canucks roster, he added his first NHL career hat-trick on March 27, 2006, in a 7–4 win against the Los Angeles Kings. He finished with seven goals and 12 points over 43 games in his NHL rookie campaign. Burrows' ascension to the NHL has been attributed to his hard-working and abrasive style of play, generating momentum for his team and aggravating opposing players.

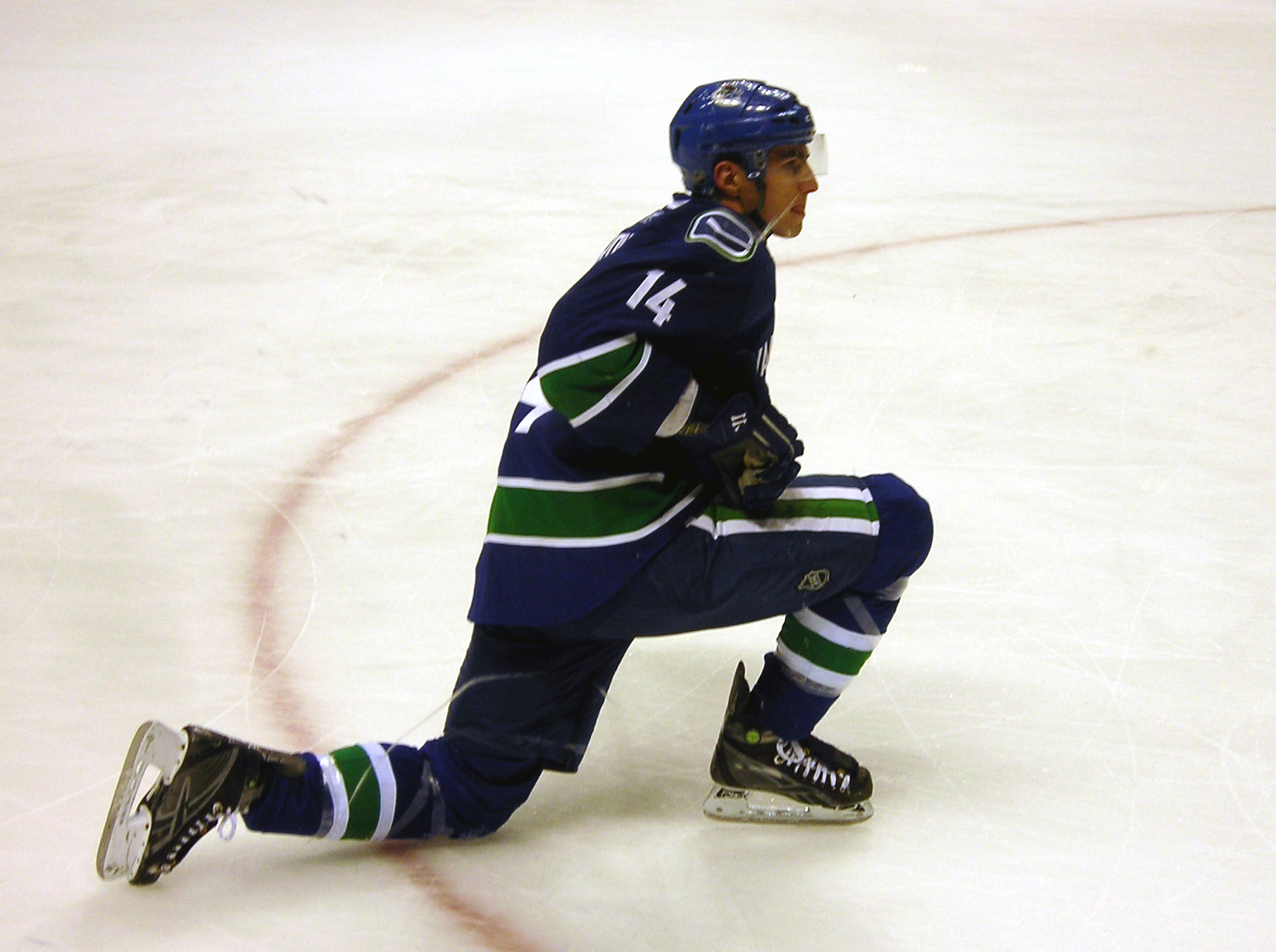
Burrows with the Vancouver Canucks in March 2009

Burrows completed his first full campaign and second altogether with the Canucks the following season in 2006–07. He contributed primarily on the team's penalty kill, which ranked first in the league. Burrows' average shorthanded ice time per game was second among team forwards, behind Ryan Kesler. He struggled to produce offensively, however, and recorded a career-low three goals and nine points in 81 games.

In 2007–08, Burrows formed an effective duo with centre Ryan Kesler on the third line as defensive forwards, countering opposing teams' top players while contributing offensively, as well. During the season, he was fined an undisclosed amount by the league after spearing Detroit Red Wings forward Aaron Downey at centre ice during the two teams' pre-game skate on February 23, 2008. He finished the campaign with 12 goals, 31 points and a team-high plus-minus of +11 in all 82 games as the Canucks narrowly missed the playoffs as they missed the 2008 playoffs by three points. He was voted by Canucks' fans to receive the team's Most Exciting Player Award and the Fred J. Hume Award, given to the team's "unsung hero" as voted by the Canucks Booster Club.

After remaining on the third line with Kesler at the start of the 2008–09 season, Canucks head coach Alain Vigneault separated the two after the All-Star break, placing Burrows on the first line with Daniel and Henrik Sedin, beginning on February 12, 2009, during a game against the Phoenix Coyotes. Burrows' crash-the-net style—skating hard to the opposing team's goalmouth for rebounds or tip-ins—combined well with the Sedins' cycling plays and as time went on, he would be labeled as the "third Sedin" as a result of the instant chemistry between Burrows and the two Sedin brothers. Vigneault's line adjustments were precipitated by a losing streak in January, which Burrows was instrumental in breaking. The Canucks' home winless streak had extended to eight games, a franchise record, when Burrows broke a 3–3 tie with a shorthanded breakaway goal with 82 seconds remaining in a game against the Carolina Hurricanes. This sparked a resurgence in the Canucks, spearheaded by Burrows, who then immediately followed their record setting home losing streak with a record setting home winning streak, winning their next 10 games at home. Shortly thereafter, the Canucks extended his contract with a four-year, $8 million deal on February 4, 2009, quadrupling his $525,000 salary. Following a game against the Edmonton Oilers on April 4, Burrows received a $2,500 fine from the league for punching Oilers winger and enforcer Zach Stortini from the bench. Late in the campaign, he was selected by the Professional Hockey Writers' Association as the Canucks' nominee for the Bill Masterton Memorial Trophy, awarded for perseverance, dedication and sportsmanship. Burrows was not shortlisted to the final three for the award, however. Prior to the last game of the season, he received his second consecutive Most Exciting Player Award. Playing in a more offensive role on the first line for the latter part of the season, Burrows finished his breakout season with 51 points (28 goals, 31 assists) in all 82 games as the Canucks as a team had a bounce-back season having returned to the playoffs and finishing as the third seed in the West. His 28 goals broke Andrew Brunette's mark for the most in a single season by an ECHL alumnus (27 in 2006–07). In the subsequent first round of the 2009 playoffs, Burrows scored the series-winning goal in overtime in game four to sweep the sixth-seeded St. Louis Blues. It was his second goal of the game as he scored a goal earlier in that game, which occurred in the second period. The Canucks advanced to meet the fourth-seeded Chicago Blackhawks in the second round, who defeated them in six games. Burrows' level of play was noticeably diminished in the Chicago series and it was revealed afterwards that he required surgery to remove bone chips in his left wrist. He finished the playoffs with three goals and an assist over 10 games.

The half way into the 2009–10 season, Burrows recorded back-to-back hat tricks against the Columbus Blue Jackets and Phoenix Coyotes on January 5 and 7, 2010, respectively. It marked the first time an NHL player notched consecutive three-goal games since Atlanta Thrashers forward Ilya Kovalchuk in November 2007 and the first time a Canucks player did so since Petri Skriko in 1986. With six goals and an assist over two games, Burrows was named the NHL First Star of the Week on January 11, 2010. The night of his first star of the week selection, Burrows and the Canucks played a controversial game against the Nashville Predators. With the game tied 2–2 in the third period, Burrows was penalized twice by referee Stéphane Auger—once for diving and the other for interference. The latter call was deemed questionable by media sources, including TSN and the National Post. The interference penalty along with an additional penalty committed by Henrik Sedin resulted in Nashville's game-winning, 5-on-3 powerplay goal late in the game. With three seconds to go in regulation, Burrows skated by Auger and protested the interference penalty, resulting in an unsportsmanlike minor and a ten-minute misconduct. Following the game, Burrows accused Auger of having a personal vendetta against him for a play against the Predators the previous month that had made him look bad. After Burrows had been hit into the boards by Nashville forward Jerred Smithson during a game on December 8, 2009, Auger assessed Smithson with a five-minute major and a game misconduct. However, the league later rescinded because it was believed Burrows had embellished injury. Burrows claimed that Auger told him before the January 11 game: "you made me look bad [for calling the Smithson penalty] so I'm going to get you back tonight." He went on to tell reporters that Auger "should stay out for the rest of the year making calls like that ... We just blew two points because of his officiating tonight." The following day, the NHL fined Burrows US$2,500 for publicly criticizing Auger and deemed that his claims "cannot be substantiated." Later that week, the Canadian Broadcasting Corporation (CBC)'s Hockey Night in Canada telecast aired an 11-minute segment hosted by Ron MacLean and NHL vice-president Colin Campbell reviewing Burrows' past transgressions, spanning two years. The segment was widely criticized for being biased against Burrows and failing to illustrate both sides of the argument. Burrows' parents subsequently issued a formal letter of complaint to the CBC, accusing MacLean of "verbal assassination" and for displaying "no journalistic balance." The following Saturday after the segment aired, the Canucks refused any interviews with the CBC before, during or after their game against the Chicago Blackhawks, which was broadcast on Hockey Night in Canada. The boycott was ordered by Canucks general manager Mike Gillis after MacLean refused to apologize. CBC and Canucks representatives later agreed in a conference call to "move on" and team players were allowed to resume interviews. MacLean later issued an unofficial apology aimed to clarify the situation. On April 1, Burrows left during a game against the Los Angeles Kings after being hit in the throat by a Jarret Stoll slapshot. He was not injured, however, and did not miss any games thereafter. Playing on the Canucks' top line with the Sedins, he had a breakout season as he recorded a career-high 35 goals, 32 assists, 67 points and a +34 rating in all 82 games for the third straight season and the Canucks as a team finished as the third seed in the West for the second straight season and third time in four seasons. His goals total ranked first on the Canucks. Fans voted him as recipient of the team's Most Exciting Player Award for the third consecutive season. While Burrows' offensive numbers increased from playing on the top line, the Sedins' mutually benefitted from playing with him. Daniel and Henrik had not had a constant linemate on the first line since Anson Carter played with them in 2005–06. Since then, Vigneault had used a variety of wingers, including Markus Näslund, Taylor Pyatt and Steve Bernier, to fill in the unit. In those years, Daniel and Henrik were point-a-game players; with Burrows on their line, they vaulted into top scorers in the league, as Henrik won the Art Ross Trophy as the league's leading point-getter (Daniel scored at a similar pace, but played less due to an early season injury).

In the 2010 Stanley Cup playoffs, the Canucks first line struggled to score in the playoffs, but the Canucks managed to defeat the Kings in the first round in six games. The Canucks advanced to the second round and were eliminated by the Chicago Blackhawks for the second consecutive year. In 12 playoff games, Burrows scored three goals and notched three assists. It was revealed in the off-season that Burrows was suffering from a shoulder injury, for which he later received surgery.

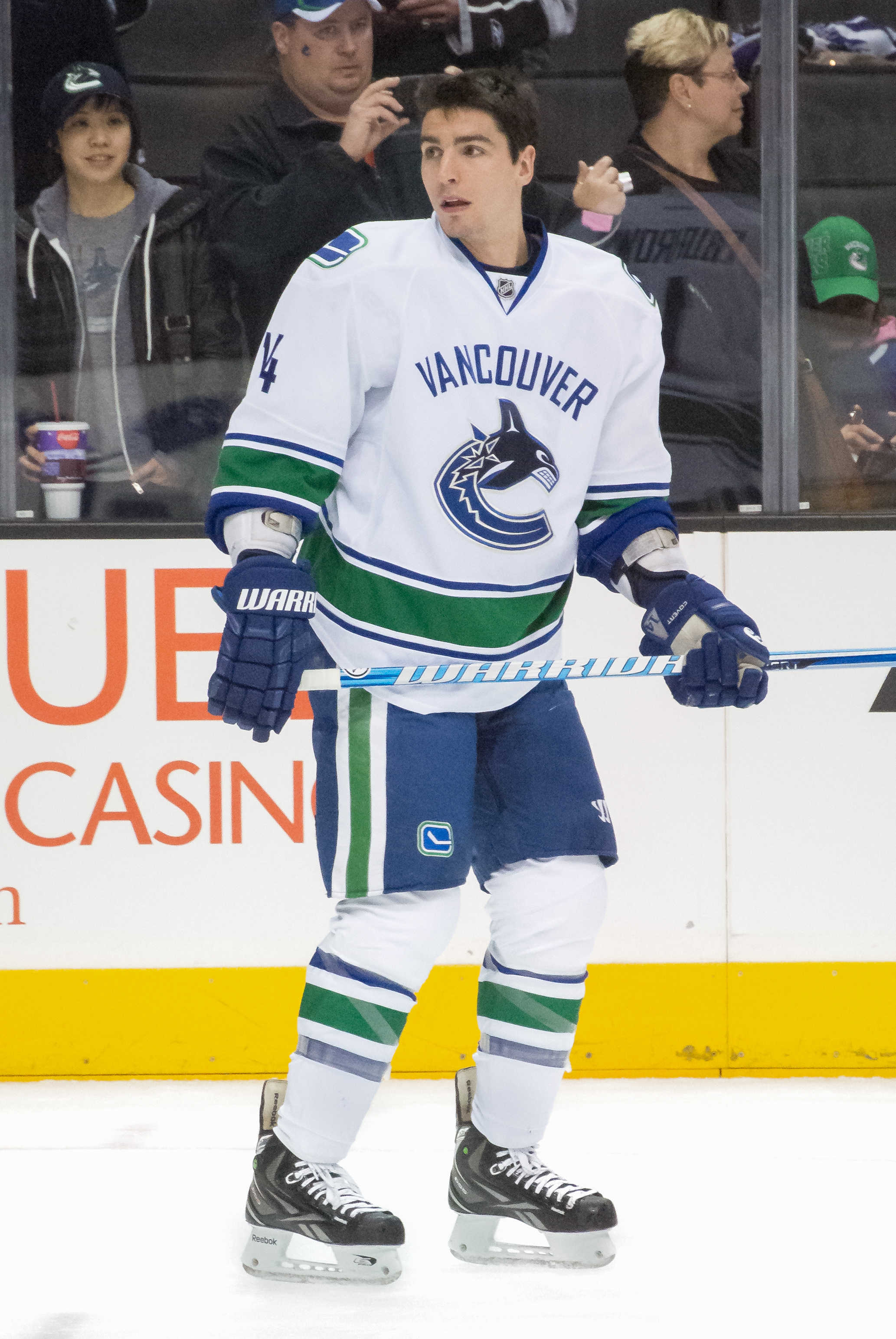
Burrows prior to a game in January 2013

Burrows missed the first ten games of the 2010–11 season rehabbing from shoulder surgery. Continuing to play with the Sedins upon his return, he recorded 48 points (26 goals and 22 assists) in 72 games and was sixth on the team in scoring. Winning the Presidents' Trophy for the first time in franchise history, the Canucks entered the 2011 playoffs as the first seed in the West, matched up against the Blackhawks for the third consecutive year. With a 3–0 lead in the series, the Canucks lost the next three games. In Game 7, Burrows scored both Canucks goals on Blackhawks goaltender Corey Crawford, including the overtime winner, to defeat the defending champions. After defeating the Nashville Predators and San Jose Sharks in rounds two and three, the Canucks reached the Stanley Cup Finals for the first time in 17 years. Facing the Boston Bruins, Burrows received much attention in the series for allegedly biting Bruins forward Patrice Bergeron during a scrum at the end of the first period in Game 1. Burrows appeared to bite down on Bergeron's finger while both players were pushing and shoving each other while being separated by a linesman. The incident was reviewed by the league, but was ruled unsuspendable with "no conclusive evidence that [he] intentionally bit [Bergeron's] finger." In Game 2, Burrows had a three-point night, including scoring his second overtime goal of the playoffs on Bruins goaltender Tim Thomas. Occurring 11 seconds into the extra period, it was the second-fastest overtime goal scored in Stanley Cup Finals history; with the goal, he also tied an NHL record held by 28 other players by scoring two overtime goals in one playoff. Despite holding 2-0 and 3-2 series leads, the Canucks went on to lose to the Bruins in seven games, losing Game 7 4–0. Burrows finished the postseason with nine goals and eight assists in 25 games.

On February 21, 2012, Burrows played in his 500th NHL game in a 3–1 loss to the Nashville Predators. Burrows recorded 28 goals, 24 assists and 52 points in 80 contests through the 2011–12 season, helping Vancouver to a second consecutive Presidents' Trophy. Facing the eventual-champion Los Angeles Kings in the first round of the 2012 playoffs, they were defeated in five games. Burrows had one goal and no assists for only one point overall in all five games during the series.

On March 16, 2013, Burrows scored a goal six seconds into a game against the Detroit Red Wings, setting a Canucks record for fastest goal scored to start a game. This surpassed the previous record of nine seconds set by Trevor Linden and was also the fourth-fastest goal scored to start a game in NHL history. Burrows managed 13 goals and 11 assists for 24 points in the lock-out-shortened 2012–13 season, leading the team in goals.

Burrows had a forgettable injury-marred 2013–14 season. On October 3, 2013, in the season opener against the San Jose Sharks where the Canucks lost the game 4–1, Burrows suffered a broken foot after blocking a shot from Sharks forward Patrick Marleau, causing him to miss the next 12 games. On December 1, in a 3–2 win over the Carolina Hurricanes, Burrows would get re-injured as he would suffer a broken jaw after getting hit in the face with the puck from a clearing attempt from teammate Chris Tanev. This injury would require surgery and would sideline Burrows for the next 20 games. In the 49 games he played, scoring only five goals and 10 assists for 15 points and did not score his first goal of the season until game 36, where he scored two goals against the Winnipeg Jets. His 15 points on the year were the third-lowest of his career and his lowest since 2006–07. The 2013–14 season was also forgettable for the Canucks as a whole, as they failed to qualify for the playoffs for the first time since 2007–08.

The 2014–15 season saw the Canucks sign free agent Radim Vrbata, who replaced Burrows as the Sedins' primary linemate for the first half of the season. Burrows played only the second half of the season with the Sedins after playing mainly on the second line with Chris Higgins and rookie Bo Horvat for the first half of the season. On October 30, 2014, in a 3–2 OT win over his hometown team, the Montreal Canadiens, Burrows delivered an illegal check to the head of Canadiens defenceman Alexei Emelin. Despite Emelin not being injured on the play and returning to the game, Burrows was suspended for three games. Burrows ended the season tallying 18 goals and 15 assists for 33 points in 70 games but then would be held without a goal and would record two assists and points in three games in the 2015 playoffs as the Canucks would lose in the opening round in six games. Despite not facing any supplemental discipline from the league after for instigating a fight with Flames defenceman Kris Russell with less than five minutes left in Game 3 and receiving an instigation penalty along with a five minute fighting major and 10-minute game misconduct, Burrows didn't play the last three games of the series due to a fractured rib suffered during a morning skate prior to Game 4 of the series, causing him to miss the rest of the series.

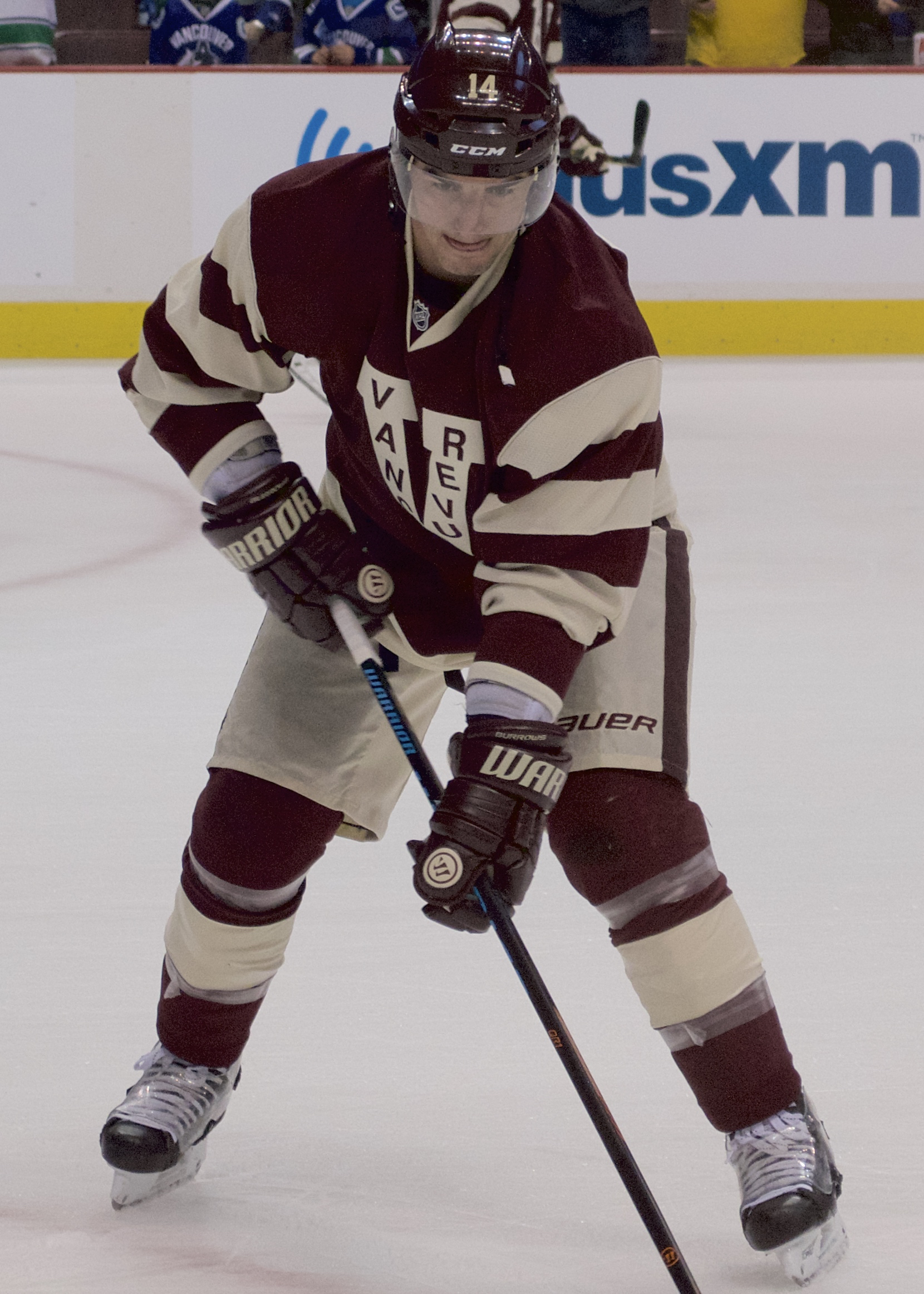
Burrows in the Canucks' commemorative Vancouver Millionaires jersey in March 2015

Burrows finished the 2015–16 season with nine goals and 13 assists for 22 points in 79 games, splitting time on the second or third line. Towards the end of the season, it was speculated the Canucks would buy-out the final year of Burrows' contract in favour of playing a younger player. In March 2016, he was reportedly told by Canucks coaching staff "younger players were a roster priority". However, in the ensuing off-season, the Canucks instead bought-out the contract of teammate Chris Higgins and stated they would not be doing the same to Burrows.

==== Ottawa Senators (2017–2018) ====
After Burrows was asked to waive his no-trade clause, on February 27, 2017, he was traded to the Ottawa Senators in exchange for Jonathan Dahlén. Ottawa immediately signed Burrows to a two-year contract extension. He made his debut for the Senators on March 2, 2017, scoring both goals in a 2–1 victory over the Colorado Avalanche. Burrows played 15 games in the 2017 playoffs before suffering an injury in Game 3 of the Eastern Conference finals on May 17, subsequently ending his season. His Ottawa Senators were eliminated in seven games by the eventual Stanley Cup champions Pittsburgh Penguins.

On February 7, 2018, Burrows was suspended ten games for kneeing New Jersey Devils forward Taylor Hall in the head during a game on February 6, 2018. Burrows himself lamented on the incident: "Obviously, I messed up on that one. I let the emotions get the best of me." While serving the suspension, the Senators placed Burrows on waivers, but he went unclaimed by any of the NHL's other 30 teams.

Burrows' first full season in Ottawa was a disappointment, with the forward recording six goals in 71 games. On June 27, 2018, the Senators placed Burrows on unconditional waivers for the purpose of a buyout. Since his contract was signed after he had turned age 35, his salary would still represent a full cap-hit for the team.

== Post-playing career ==
On July 6, 2018, it was announced that Burrows had retired from active play and that he would join the Laval Rocket, the American Hockey League (AHL) affiliate of the Montreal Canadiens, as an assistant coach. On February 24, 2021, Burrows was appointed to assistant coach of the Canadiens. After three seasons behind the Canadiens' bench, Burrows transitioned into a player development role beginning in July 2024.

== International play ==
Following his seventh NHL season, Burrows received his first invite to the Canadian national team for the 2012 IIHF World Championship, held in Finland and Sweden. (Note: Burrows had played for Canada's national ball hockey team, which was unaffiliated with Hockey Canada.) Burrows' Vancouver Canucks had been eliminated in the first round of the 2012 playoffs, making him available for selection. (Note: The scheduling of the IIHF World Championship and Stanley Cup playoffs annually conflict with each other. As a result, only NHL players who did not qualify for the playoffs or were eliminated early in the post-season (ie. first or second round) are available for the international competition.) At 31 years old, he was the oldest player on the Canadian roster. Making his Team Canada debut against Slovakia in the first game of the tournament, he fell to the ice and hit his head after colliding with two opposing players. After leaving the ice, he was kept out of the contest with concerns that he had sustained a concussion. The following day, Burrows' agent, Paul Corbeil, told reporters that while he was symptom free, a return to the line-up would not be possible for four to five days, as per team protocol in scenarios in which a concussion is suspected. Returning to the line-up a week after the hit, he scored his first career international goal against Finnish goaltender Kari Lehtonen in a 5–3 win. The following contest, he scored a shorthanded goal in an 8–0 win against Kazakhstan to earn player of the game honours for Canada.

== Ball hockey career ==
Burrows began playing organized ball hockey at the age of 19. In 2001, he won his first national championship with the Montreal Red Lites in Burnaby, British Columbia. Burrows went on to win the national championship in every year he played with the Red Lites. He was the tournament scoring leader in 2002 and 2003 and earned All-Star Team honours from 2002 to 2004. In 2005, Burrows scored two goals in a 5–2 win against the Toronto Midnight Express in the national final to capture his fifth consecutive Canadian title with the Red Lites. Burrows was named the Tournament MVP by the Canadian Ball Hockey Association (CBHA). He returned the following year to lead the Red Lites to a sixth consecutive title in 2006.

Burrows made his first appearance on the international stage in ball hockey when he was named to Canada's national ball hockey team for the 2003 World Championships in Sierre, Switzerland. He helped Canada beat the Czech Republic 6–1 in the final. Tying for the lead in tournament scoring with five goals and 10 points, Burrows was named the Most Valuable Forward. Two years later, in 2005, he won his second World Championship in as many appearances with Canada in Pittsburgh, Pennsylvania. He capped the season off by being named the 2005 International Player of the Year by the International Street and Ball Hockey Federation (ISBHF). The following year, he was voted in a Canadian poll as the country's greatest ball hockey player ever.

Burrows has credited ball hockey for his fitness and discipline which has carried over to the NHL. Following his first full season with the Canucks in 2006–07, Burrows retired from his ball hockey career. In 2010, he was inducted into the CBHA Hall of Fame, along with national teammate and goaltender Michel Perodeau. He is also a member of the ISBHF Hall of Fame.

Alex Burrows is the president of The Alex Burrows Tour which specializes in large-scale ball hockey tournaments. They are renowned for being accessible to everyone and bringing together the largest number of dek hockey players in one place and offering the most prestigious tournaments across Canada. The Alex Burrows Tour is more than 17 categories (men, women and mixed) with teams from all over North America.

In February 2020, Alex Burrows helped launch the Ligue Nationale Hockey Balle, a professional ball hockey league.

== Personal life ==
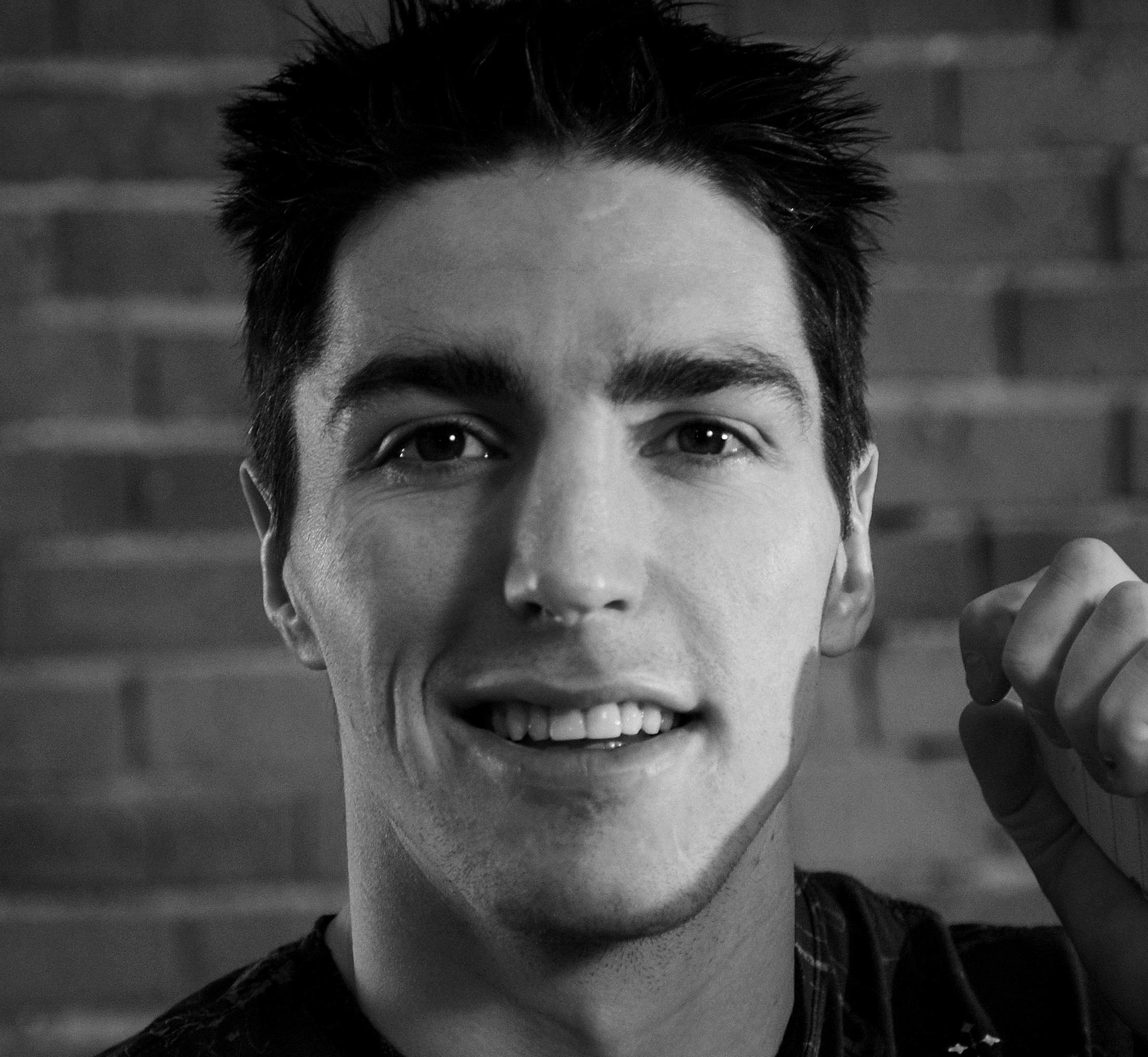
Burrows in January 2010

Burrows was born in Pincourt, Québec, to parents Rodney and Carole. His father emigrated from London, England, at 23, while his mother, a Québec native, is an elementary school principal. Burrows has two sisters as well—one older and one younger. He grew up speaking mostly French and attended French schools. His English has a noticeable Québecois accent.

In July 2010, Burrows married his longtime girlfriend, Nancy Roy. On April 27, 2011, Nancy gave birth to the couple's first child, a girl named Victoria. Alex became a second-time father on March 4, 2013, to a daughter named Lexie. On November 15, 2015, the couple's third child and first son Jacob was born. They live in Montreal during the off-season.

Burrows was the closest friend on the Canucks to former teammate Luc Bourdon, who died in a motorcycle accident in May 2008. In the hockey season following his death, Burrows occasionally celebrated goals with a bow-and-arrow mime, a gesture that Bourdon himself did after scoring during his junior career. He and his wife (girlfriend at the time) remained close to Bourdon's girlfriend, Charlene Ward.

In the 2009 off-season, Burrows was involved in an assault incident while playing in a summer ice hockey league. Police were called to an arena in Kirkland, Québec, on July 21 after Burrows allegedly struck a goaltender, 19-year-old Koray Celik, in the face. No arrests were made at the scene.

== Career statistics ==
=== Regular season and playoffs ===
			Regular season					Playoffs
Season	Team	League	GP	G	A	Pts	PIM	GP	G	A	Pts	PIM
2000–01	Shawinigan Cataractes	QMJHL	63	16	14	30	105	10	2	1	3	8
2001–02	Shawinigan Cataractes	QMJHL	64	35	35	70	184	10	9	10	19	20
2002–03	Greenville Grrrowl	ECHL	53	9	17	26	201	—	—	—	—	—
2002–03	Baton Rouge Kingfish	ECHL	13	4	2	6	64	—	—	—	—	—
2003–04	Columbia Inferno	ECHL	64	29	44	73	194	4	2	0	2	28
2003–04	Manitoba Moose	AHL	2	0	0	0	0	—	—	—	—	—
2004–05	Columbia Inferno	ECHL	4	5	1	6	4	—	—	—	—	—
2004–05	Manitoba Moose	AHL	72	9	17	26	107	14	0	3	3	37
2005–06	Manitoba Moose	AHL	33	12	18	30	57	13	6	7	13	27
2005–06	Vancouver Canucks	NHL	43	7	5	12	61	—	—	—	—	—
2006–07	Vancouver Canucks	NHL	81	3	6	9	93	11	1	0	1	14
2007–08	Vancouver Canucks	NHL	82	12	19	31	179	—	—	—	—	—
2008–09	Vancouver Canucks	NHL	82	28	23	51	150	10	3	1	4	20
2009–10	Vancouver Canucks	NHL	82	35	32	67	121	12	3	3	6	22
2010–11	Vancouver Canucks	NHL	72	26	22	48	77	25	9	8	17	34
2011–12	Vancouver Canucks	NHL	80	28	24	52	90	5	1	0	1	7
2012–13	Vancouver Canucks	NHL	47	13	11	24	54	4	2	1	3	6
2013–14	Vancouver Canucks	NHL	49	5	10	15	71	—	—	—	—	—
2014–15	Vancouver Canucks	NHL	70	18	15	33	68	3	0	2	2	21
2015–16	Vancouver Canucks	NHL	79	9	13	22	49	—	—	—	—	—
2016–17	Vancouver Canucks	NHL	55	9	11	20	53	—	—	—	—	—
2016–17	Ottawa Senators	NHL	20	6	5	11	9	15	0	5	5	18
2017–18	Ottawa Senators	NHL	71	6	8	14	59	—	—	—	—	—
NHL totals			913	205	204	409	1,134	85	19	20	39	142

=== International ===
Year	Team	Event	Result	GP	G	A	Pts	PIM
2012	Canada	WC	5th	5	3	0	3	2
2014	Canada	WC	5th	6	0	1	1	4
Senior totals				11	3	1	4	6

== Awards ==
=== ECHL ===
Award	Year
All-Star Game	2004

=== Vancouver Canucks ===
Award	Year
Most Exciting Player Award	2008, 2009, 2010
Fred J. Hume Award (unsung hero)	2008
Vancouver Canucks Ring of Honour	Inducted 2019

=== NHL ===
Award	Year
First Star of the Week	January 11, 2010

=== Ball hockey ===
Award	Year
Canadian National Championship (Montreal Red Lites)	2001, 2002, 2003, 2003, 2004, 2005, 2006
CBHA All-Star Team	2002, 2003, 2004
World Championship (Canada)	2003, 2005
CBHA MVP	2005
ISBHF International Player of the Year	2005
Canadian Ball Hockey Hall of Fame inductee	2010
