= Kevin Swanson =

Kevin Swanson may refer to:

- Kevin Swanson (Family Guy), fictional character from the animated television series Family Guy
- Kevin Swanson (ice hockey) (born 1980), Canadian ice hockey goaltender
- Kevin Swanson (pastor), a Christian pastor in Colorado known for his views on homosexuality
- Cub Swanson, Kevin "Cub" Swanson, American mixed martial artist
