= 1999–2000 WHL season =

Junior ice hockey season

- League: Western Hockey League
- Sport: Ice hockey
- Teams: 18

Regular season
- Scotty Munro Memorial Trophy: Calgary Hitmen (2)
- Season MVP: Brad Moran (Calgary Hitmen)
- Top scorer: Brad Moran (Calgary Hitmen)

Playoffs
- Playoffs MVP: Dan Blackburn (Ice)
- Finals champions: Kootenay Ice (1)
- Runners-up: Spokane Chiefs

WHL seasons
- 1998–99 2000–01

1999–2000 CHL season
- League: Canadian Hockey League
- Sport: Ice hockey
- Teams: 54

OHL

QMJHL

WHL

Memorial Cup
- Finals champions: Rimouski Océanic (QMJHL) (1st title)
- Runners-up: Barrie Colts (OHL)

The 1999–2000 WHL season was the 34th season of the Western Hockey League (WHL). The season featured eighteen teams and a 72-game season. The Calgary Hitmen won their second consecutive Scotty Munro Memorial Trophy for having the league's best regular season record. In the playoffs, the Kootenay Ice won the franchise's first President's Cup in just their second season playing in Cranbrook, British Columbia.

== League notes ==
- The WHL followed the lead of the National Hockey League and adopted both 4-on-4 overtime and a standings format that saw teams losing in overtime earn one point.

== Regular season ==
Map of WHL, 1998–97 to 2000–01
East Division
Central Division
West Division

=== Final standings ===
East Division
Pos	Team	Pld	W	L	T	OTL	GF	GA	Pts
1	x – Swift Current Broncos	72	47	18	4	3	257	170	101
2	x – Saskatoon Blades	72	34	27	8	3	216	223	79
3	x – Regina Pats	72	32	29	6	5	234	255	75
4	x – Prince Albert Raiders	72	26	33	6	7	221	257	65
5	x – Moose Jaw Warriors	72	25	34	9	4	221	259	63
6	Brandon Wheat Kings	72	25	38	4	5	212	260	59

x – qualified for playoffs

Central Division
Pos	Team	Pld	W	L	T	OTL	GF	GA	Pts
1	x – Calgary Hitmen	72	58	10	2	2	313	182	120
2	x – Kootenay Ice	72	44	14	11	3	275	200	102
3	x – Red Deer Rebels	72	32	31	9	0	227	229	73
4	Lethbridge Hurricanes	72	25	38	4	5	220	250	59
5	Medicine Hat Tigers	72	21	39	6	6	222	295	54

x – qualified for playoffs

West Division
Pos	Team	Pld	W	L	T	OTL	GF	GA	Pts
1	x – Spokane Chiefs	72	47	19	4	2	272	191	100
2	x – Prince George Cougars	72	43	20	4	5	279	228	95
3	x – Seattle Thunderbirds	72	34	26	8	4	250	221	80
4	x – Kamloops Blazers	72	36	30	5	1	244	228	78
5	x – Kelowna Rockets	72	25	40	4	3	193	228	57
6	x – Tri-City Americans	72	24	39	7	2	231	288	57
7	Portland Winter Hawks	72	16	49	7	0	173	296	39

x – qualified for playoffs

=== Scoring leaders ===
Note: GP = Games played; G = Goals; A = Assists; Pts = Points; PIM = Penalties in minutes

Player	Team	GP	G	A	Pts	PIM
Brad Moran	Calgary Hitmen	72	48	72	120	84
Pavel Brendl	Calgary Hitmen	61	59	52	111	91
Radek Duda	Lethbridge Hurricanes	69	42	64	106	190
Layne Ulmer	Swift Current Broncos	71	50	54	104	66
Justin Mapletoft	Red Deer Rebels	72	39	57	96	135
Tim Smith	Spokane Chiefs	71	26	70	96	61
Trent Hunter	Prince George Cougars	67	46	49	95	47
Mike G. Green	Kootenay Ice	69	43	49	92	63
Zdenek Blatny	Seattle/Kootenay	68	47	44	91	131
Jeremy Reich	Swift Current Broncos	72	33	58	91	167

=== Goaltending leaders ===
Note: GP = Games played; Min = Minutes played; W = Wins; L = Losses; T = Ties; GA = Goals against; SO = Total shutouts; SV% = Save percentage; GAA = Goals against average

Player	Team	GP	Min	W	L	T	GA	SO	SV%	GAA
Bryce Wandler	Swift Current Broncos	56	3257	37	15	2	112	6	.919	2.06
Brent Krahn	Calgary Hitmen	39	2316	33	6	0	92	4	.912	2.38
Dan Blackburn	Kootenay Ice	51	3004	34	8	7	126	3	.912	2.52
Tyler MacKay	Saskatoon/Spokane	42	2357	25	11	2	109	2	.883	2.77
Cam Ondrik	Medicine Hat/Saskatoon	58	3381	30	24	4	159	4	.908	2.82

== 2000 WHL Playoffs ==
- Top eight teams in the Eastern Conference (East and Central divisions) qualified for playoffs
- Top six teams in the Western Conference (division) qualified for the playoffs

First round
C1	Calgary	4
E5	Moose Jaw	0
E2	Saskatoon	4
E3	Regina	3
C2	Kootenay	4
C3	Red Deer	0
E1	Swift Current	4
E4	Prince Albert	2
W1	Spokane	4
W6	Tri-City	0
W2	Prince George	4
W5	Kelowna	1
W3	Seattle	4
W4	Kamloops	0

Division Semi-Finals
C1	Calgary	4
E2	Saskatoon	0
C2	Kootenay	4
E1	Swift Current	2
W1	Spokane	bye
W2	Prince George	3
W3	Seattle	0

Division Finals
C1	Calgary	1
C2	Kootenay	4
W1	Spokane	4
W2	Prince George	1

WHL Championship
C2	Kootenay	4
W1	Spokane	2

=== Conference quarterfinals ===
==== Eastern Conference ====
Calgary vs. Moose Jaw
Date	Away	Home	
March 29	Moose Jaw 4	5 Calgary	OT
March 30	Moose Jaw 3	6 Calgary	
April 1	Calgary 4	2 Moose Jaw	
April 2	Calgary 8	2 Moose Jaw	
Calgary wins series 4–0

Swift Current vs. Prince Albert
Date	Away	Home
March 30	Prince Albert 3	2 Swift Current
March 31	Prince Albert 2	6 Swift Current
April 2	Swift Current 4	2 Prince Albert
April 3	Swift Current 2	5 Prince Albert
April 5	Prince Albert 3	6 Swift Current
April 7	Swift Current 4	3 Prince Albert
Swift Current wins series 4–2

Kootenay vs. Red Deer
Date	Away	Home	
March 30	Red Deer 4	7 Kootenay	
March 31	Red Deer 0	8 Kootenay	
April 2	Kootenay 7	4 Red Deer	
April 3	Kootenay 2	1 Red Deer	OT
Kootenay wins series 4–0

Saskatoon vs. Regina
Date	Away	Home
March 29	Regina 6	4 Saskatoon
March 31	Saskatoon 1	6 Regina
April 1	Regina 0	3 Saskatoon
April 3	Saskatoon 6	3 Regina
April 5	Regina 0	4 Saskatoon
April 7	Saskatoon 2	7 Regina
April 8	Regina 1	5 Saskatoon
Saskatoon wins series 4–3

==== Western Conference ====
Spokane vs. Tri-City
Date	Away	Home
March 29	Tri-City 1	8 Spokane
March 31	Spokane 6	2 Tri-City
April 1	Spokane 3	2 Tri-City
April 5	Tri-City 0	2 Spokane
Spokane wins series 4–0

Seattle vs. Kamloops
Date	Away	Home
April 1	Kamloops 2	5 Seattle
April 2	Kamloops 2	7 Seattle
April 4	Seattle 3	2 Kamloops
April 5	Seattle 5	2 Kamloops
Seattle wins series 4–0

Prince George vs. Kelowna
Date	Away	Home	
March 31	Kelowna 4	2 Prince George	
April 1	Kelowna 0	4 Prince George	
April 4	Prince George 4	1 Kelowna	
April 5	Prince George 4	2 Kelowna	
April 7	Kelowna 3	4 Prince George	OT
Prince George wins series 4–1

=== Conference semifinals ===
Eastern Conference

Calgary vs. Saskatoon
Date	Away	Home
April 10	Saskatoon 0	7 Calgary
April 11	Saskatoon 2	6 Calgary
April 13	Calgary 6	2 Saskatoon
April 14	Calgary 4	2 Saskatoon
Calgary wins series 4–0

Kootenay vs. Swift Current
Date	Away	Home
April 10	Swift Current 2	1 Kootenay
April 11	Swift Current 2	6 Kootenay
April 13	Kootenay 1	2 Swift Current
April 14	Kootenay 4	2 Swift Current
April 16	Swift Current 1	6 Kootenay
April 18	Kootenay 3	1 Swift Current
Kootenay wins series 4–2

Western Conference

Prince George vs. Seattle
Date	Away	Home
April 13	Seattle 2	5 Prince George
April 14	Seattle 0	7 Prince George
April 16	Prince George 4	2 Seattle
Prince George wins series 3–0

Spokane earns bye

=== Conference finals ===
Eastern Conference

Calgary vs. Kootenay
Date	Away	Home	
April 21	Kootenay 2	3 Calgary	
April 22	Kootenay 3	2 Calgary	
April 25	Calgary 2	3 Kootenay	
April 26	Calgary 2	3 Kootenay	
April 29	Kootenay 6	5 Calgary	OT
Kootenay wins series 4–1

Western Conference

Prince George vs. Spokane
Date	Away	Home	
April 23	Prince George 4	5 Spokane	
April 24	Prince George 3	4 Spokane	
April 25	Spokane 0	3 Prince George	
April 28	Spokane 4	3 Prince George	OT
April 29	Spokane 4	2 Prince George	
Spokane wins series 4–1

=== WHL Championship ===
Kootenay vs. Spokane
Date	Away	Home
May 5	Spokane 3	2 Kootenay
May 6	Spokane 3	2 Kootenay
May 9	Kootenay 3	2 Spokane
May 10	Kootenay 4	1 Spokane
May 12	Spokane 1	2 Kootenay
May 13	Kootenay 1	0 Spokane
Kootenay wins series 4–2

== All-Star game ==
On January 19, the Eastern Conference defeated the Western Conference 10–9 at Kelowna, British Columbia before a crowd of 5,420.

== WHL awards ==
Four Broncos Memorial Trophy (Player of the Year): Brad Moran, Calgary Hitmen
Daryl K. (Doc) Seaman Trophy (Scholastic Player of the Year): Chris Nielson, Calgary Hitmen
Scholastic Team of the Year: Portland Winterhawks
Bob Clarke Trophy (Top scorer): Brad Moran, Calgary Hitmen
Brad Hornung Trophy (Most Sportsmanlike Player): Trent Hunter, Prince George Cougars
Bill Hunter Trophy (Top Defenseman): Micki Dupont, Kamloops Blazers
Jim Piggott Memorial Trophy (Rookie of the Year): Dan Blackburn, Kootenay Ice
Del Wilson Trophy (Top Goaltender): Bryce Wandler, Swift Current Broncos
Dunc McCallum Memorial Trophy (Coach of the Year): Todd McLellan, Swift Current Broncos
Lloyd Saunders Memorial Trophy (Executive of the Year): Tim Speltz, Spokane Chiefs
Scotty Munro Memorial Trophy (Best regular season record): Calgary Hitmen
Allen Paradice Memorial Trophy (Top Official): Mike Hasenfratz
St. Clair Group Trophy (Marketing/Public Relations Award): Mike Jenkins, Prince Albert Raiders
WHL Humanitarian of the Year: Chris Nielson, Calgary Hitmen
WHL Plus-Minus Award: Kenton Smith, Calgary Hitmen
WHL Playoff Most Valuable Player: Dan Blackburn, Kootenay Ice

== All-Star teams ==
Eastern Conference
	First Team		Second Team	
Goal	Bryce Wandler	Swift Current Broncos	Dan Blackburn	Kootenay Ice
Defense	Steve McCarthy	Kootenay Ice	Barret Jackman	Regina Pats
Defense	Lawrence Nycholat	Swift Current Broncos	Matt Kinch	Calgary Hitmen
Forward	Justin Mapletoft	Red Deer Rebels	Zdenek Blatny	Kootenay Ice
Forward	Brad Moran	Calgary Hitmen	Pavel Brendl	Calgary Hitmen
Forward	Layne Ulmer	Swift Current Broncos	Mike Green	Kootenay Ice
Western Conference
	First Team		Second Team	
Goal	Kevin Swanson	Kelowna Rockets	unknown	
Defense	Micki DuPont	Kamloops Blazers	unknown	
Defense	Garry Toor	Prince George Cougars	unknown	
Forward	Trent Hunter	Prince George Cougars	unknown	
Forward	Tyler Bouck	Prince George Cougars	unknown	
Forward	Tim Smith	Spokane Chiefs	unknown	

== See also ==
- 2000 Memorial Cup
- 2000 NHL entry draft
- 1999 in sports
- 2000 in sports

Preceded by 1998–99 WHL season	WHL seasons	Succeeded by 2000–01 WHL season
