= Alexander Fomichev =

Russian ice hockey player

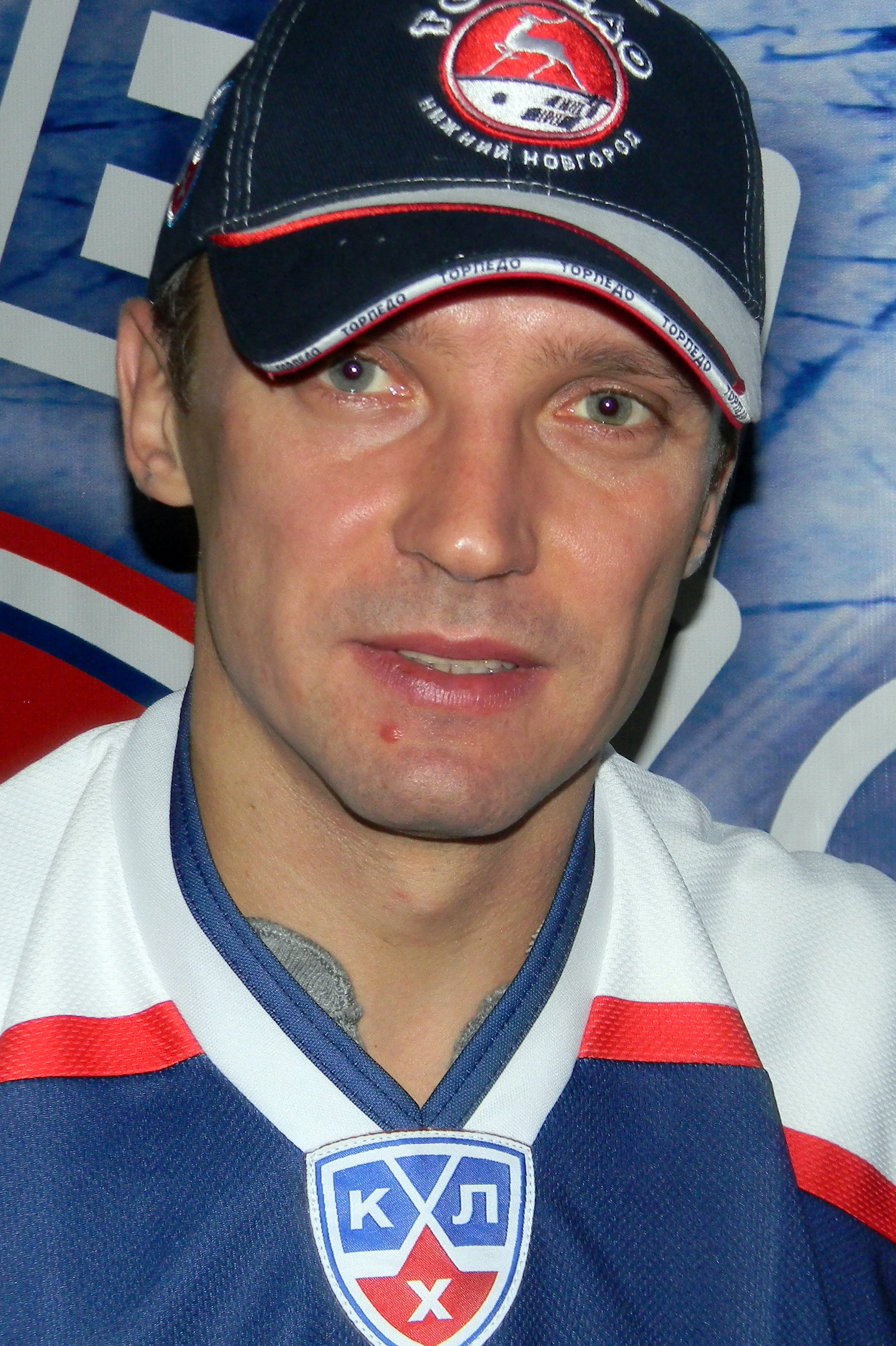
- Born: 19 February 1979 (age 47) Moscow, Russian SFSR, Soviet Union
- Height: 5 ft 10 in (178 cm)
- Weight: 187 lb (85 kg; 13 st 5 lb)
- Position: Goaltender
- Catches: Left
- KHL team Former teams: Torpedo Nizhny Novgorod; KHL/RSL; Sibir Novosibirsk; Avangard Omsk; CSKA Moscow; Amur Khabarovsk; AHL; Hamilton Bulldogs
- National team: Russia
- NHL draft: 9th round, 231st overall, 1997; Edmonton Oilers
- Playing career: 2000–present

Alexander Yurevich Fomichev (Russian: Александр Юрьевич Фомичёв; born February 19, 1979) is a Russian professional ice hockey goaltender who currently plays for Torpedo Nizhny Novgorod of the Kontinental Hockey League (KHL).

== Awards ==
- 1999 — WHL East First All-Star Team
