= Brad Moran (ice hockey) =

Canadian ice hockey player (born 1979)

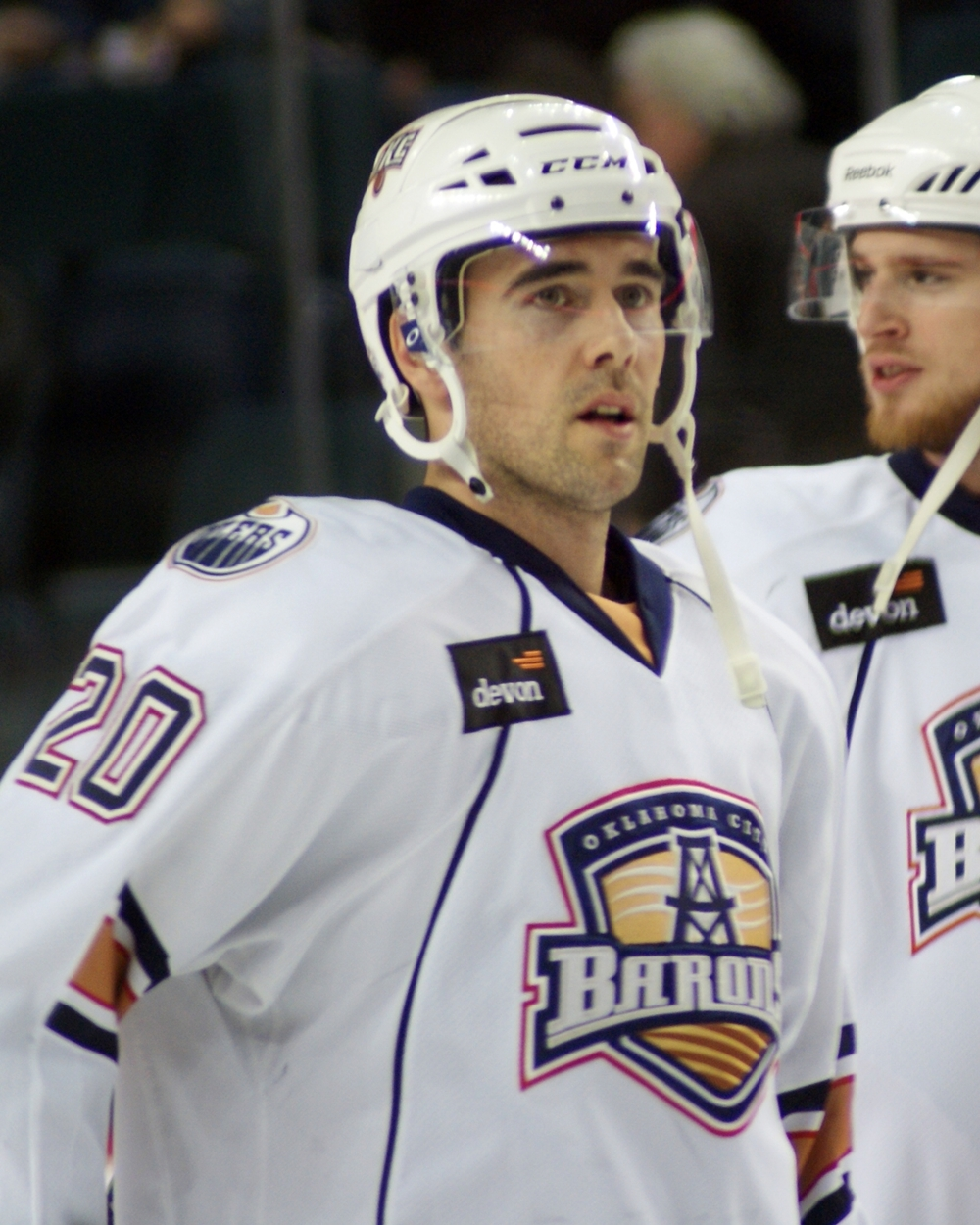
- Moran with the Oklahoma City Barons in 2011
- Born: March 20, 1979 (age 47) Abbotsford, British Columbia, Canada
- Height: 5 ft 11 in (180 cm)
- Weight: 182 lb (83 kg; 13 st 0 lb)
- Position: Centre
- Shot: Left
- Played for: Columbus Blue Jackets; Vancouver Canucks; Skellefteå AIK; Växjö Lakers; SaiPa; EHC Black Wings Linz; Nottingham Panthers
- NHL draft: 191st overall, 1998; Buffalo Sabres
- Playing career: 2000–2017

Brad Moran (born March 20, 1979) is a Canadian former professional ice hockey centre, his last team being the Nottingham Panthers of the Elite Ice Hockey League (EIHL).

== Playing career ==
A graduate of the Western Hockey League (WHL)'s Calgary Hitmen, Moran, who was originally drafted in the 7th round, 191st overall by the Buffalo Sabres in the 1998 NHL entry draft, spent five seasons with the Hitmen before signing as a free agent with the Columbus Blue Jackets in the summer of 2000.

As a prolific scorer with the Hitmen, he recorded 532 regular season and playoff points over his five-year WHL career, earning WHL Player of the Year honours and capturing the Bob Clarke Trophy as the league's top scorer in 1999–2000 while being named to the WHL Eastern Conference First All-Star Team. He later had his number retired with the Calgary Hitmen with his #20 hanging in the rafters of the Scotiabank Saddledome.

Moran spent the majority of his first four seasons of professional hockey with the Blue Jackets' AHL affiliate in Syracuse while seeing limited action the parent club in Columbus.

In June 2006, he signed with the Vancouver Canucks as a free agent. After two seasons primarily leading the Canucks' AHL affiliate, the Manitoba Moose, Moran signed for Swedish team Skelleftea AIK prior to the 2008–09 season, becoming the highest paid player on the team.

On July 7, 2010, it was announced that Moran had returned to North America, signing as a free agent with the Edmonton Oilers to a one-year contract.

On April 25, 2011, Moran signed a two-year contract with Vaxjo Lakers of the Elitserien (SEL).

On January 29, 2013 Moran signed a contract for the remainder of the 2012–13 season with SaiPa of the Finnish SM-liiga.

On April 17, 2013 he signed a contract with EHC Black Wings Linz of the Austrian Erste Bank Eishockey Liga for the 2013–14 season. After scoring at a point per game pace with 51 points in 50 games with the Black Wings, Moran was re-signed to a one-year contract to remain in Linz.

Having left the Black Wings after two seasons, Moran continued his career abroad, in agreeing to a one-year contract with English club, the Nottingham Panthers of the EIHL on August 14, 2015. Moran announced his retirement after two seasons with the Panthers, the second as club captain, in April 2017.

In November, 2018, Moran was named Head Coach of the Calgary Canucks

== Records ==
=== Calgary Hitmen ===
- Calgary Hitmen franchise record for assists in a season (72)
- Calgary Hitmen franchise record for career games played (357)
- Calgary Hitmen franchise record for career points (450)
- Calgary Hitmen franchise record for career goals (204)
- Calgary Hitmen franchise record for career assists (246)

=== Syracuse Crunch ===
- Syracuse Crunch franchise record for career powerplay goals (38)

== Career statistics ==
			Regular season					Playoffs
Season	Team	League	GP	G	A	Pts	PIM	GP	G	A	Pts	PIM
1995–96	Calgary Hitmen	WHL	70	13	31	44	28	—	—	—	—	—
1996–97	Calgary Hitmen	WHL	72	30	36	66	61	—	—	—	—	—
1997–98	Calgary Hitmen	WHL	72	53	49	102	64	18	10	8	18	20
1998–99	Calgary Hitmen	WHL	71	60	58	118	96	21	17	25	42	26
1999–2000	Calgary Hitmen	WHL	72	48	72	120	84	13	7	15	22	18
2000–01	Syracuse Crunch	AHL	71	11	19	30	30	5	3	4	7	2
2001–02	Columbus Blue Jackets	NHL	3	0	0	0	0	—	—	—	—	—
2001–02	Syracuse Crunch	AHL	64	25	24	49	51	10	5	8	13	2
2002–03	Syracuse Crunch	AHL	47	12	19	31	22	—	—	—	—	—
2003–04	Columbus Blue Jackets	NHL	2	1	1	2	2	—	—	—	—	—
2003–04	Syracuse Crunch	AHL	72	24	35	59	44	7	5	3	8	2
2004–05	Syracuse Crunch	AHL	80	26	46	72	70	7	5	3	8	2
2005–06	SC Langnau	NLA	18	4	4	8	18	—	—	—	—	—
2005–06	EHC Visp	NLB	2	3	2	5	2	—	—	—	—	—
2006–07	Vancouver Canucks	NHL	3	0	1	1	2	—	—	—	—	—
2006–07	Manitoba Moose	AHL	69	25	47	72	52	13	5	6	11	12
2007–08	Manitoba Moose	AHL	74	22	55	77	44	6	1	4	5	4
2008–09	Skellefteå AIK	SEL	55	11	31	42	28	9	2	2	4	6
2009–10	Skellefteå AIK	SEL	55	14	26	40	32	12	0	5	5	6
2010–11	Oklahoma City Barons	AHL	79	20	52	72	40	6	1	2	3	2
2011–12	Växjö Lakers	SEL	55	9	28	37	22	—	—	—	—	—
2012–13	Växjö Lakers	SEL	37	5	3	8	24	—	—	—	—	—
2012–13	SaiPa	SM-l	14	5	10	15	8	3	0	2	2	0
2013–14	EHC Black Wings Linz	EBEL	50	16	35	51	16	8	3	4	7	4
2014–15	EHC Black Wings Linz	EBEL	50	6	33	39	16	12	3	11	14	4
2015–16	Nottingham Panthers	EIHL	45	14	26	40	14	4	2	1	3	2
2016–17	Nottingham Panthers	EIHL	51	21	18	39	20	2	1	0	1	2
AHL totals			556	165	297	462	353	47	18	29	47	24
NHL totals			8	1	2	3	4	—	—	—	—	—
SEL totals			202	39	88	127	106	21	2	7	9	12

== Awards ==
- 1999 — CHL Third All-Star Team
- 1999 — WHL East First All-Star Team
- 1999 — WHL airBC Trophy
- 2000 — CHL Second All-Star Team
- 2000 — WHL Bob Clarke Trophy
- 2000 — WHL East First All-Star Team
- 2000 — WHL Four Broncos Memorial Trophy

Awards
Preceded by Brent Belecki	Winner of the WHL airBC Trophy; 1999	Succeeded by Dan Blackburn
Preceded by Pavel Brendl	Winner of the WHL Bob Clarke Trophy; 2000	Succeeded by Justin Mapletoft
Preceded by Cody Rudkowsky	Winner of the WHL Four Broncos Memorial Trophy; 2000	Succeeded by Justin Mapletoft
