= Cody Rudkowsky =

Canadian ice hockey player

- Born: July 21, 1978 (age 47) Willingdon, Alberta, Canada
- Height: 6 ft 1 in (185 cm)
- Weight: 200 lb (91 kg; 14 st 4 lb)
- Position: Goaltender
- Caught: Left
- Played for: St. Louis Blues; Edinburgh Capitals
- NHL draft: Undrafted
- Playing career: 1999–2010

Cody Rudkowsky (born July 21, 1978) is a Canadian retired ice hockey goaltender. He played one game in the National Hockey League, with the St. Louis Blues during the 2002–03 season. The rest of his career, which lasted from 1999 to 2010, was mainly spent in the minor leagues. Prior to turning professional he played in the Western Hockey League, and won the Four Broncos Memorial Trophy as the league's most valuable player in 1998–99.

== AHL and ECHL ==
Rudkowsky was born in Willingdon, Alberta. He spent most of his career in the ECHL. His one NHL game during the 2002–03 season with the St. Louis Blues, when he played on October 24, 2002 against the Edmonton Oilers, winning the game.

In the ECHL, he backstopped the Reading Royals to a career high 46 games played in 2003–04 and led the Royals to the Kelly Cup semi-finals that season. On December 31, 2005, Rudkowsky was named starting goaltender for the American Conference in the 14th annual ECHL All-Star Game

Rudkowsky was signed to a professional tryout contract (PTO) by the Grand Rapids Griffins on October 26, 2007. On October 28, he would come in relief for starting goaltender Adam Berkhoel and stop 8 of 9 shots that night. The Griffins lost that game 7–1. On February 15, 2008, he was signed again to a PTO by Grand Rapids and made a brief appearance (3m 21sec) against the Milwaukee Admirals.

== Other leagues ==
It was announced on August 27, 2009 that Rudkowsky signed a contract to play for the Edinburgh Capitals in the British Elite Ice Hockey League for the 09/10 Season. This was the first time Rudkowsky played for a team outside North America.

Rudkowsky also briefly played for the Bentley Generals in amateur Allan Cup play during the 2008–09 season and was first star of the final game of the 2008-09 Allan Cup Finals.

== Career statistics ==
=== Regular season and playoffs ===
			Regular season										Playoffs
Season	Team	League	GP	W	L	T	OTL	MIN	GA	SO	GAA	SV%	GP	W	L	MIN	GA	SO	GAA	SV%
1995–96	Langley Thunder	BCJHL	24	15	15	0	—	1172	73	1	3.73	.893	—	—	—	—	—	—	—	—
1995–96	Seattle Thunderbirds	WHL	2	0	0	0	—	21	3	0	8.57	.813	—	—	—	—	—	—	—	—
1996–97	Seattle Thunderbirds	WHL	40	19	14	2	—	2163	124	0	3.44	.901	1	1	0	30	0	0	0.00	1.000
1997–98	Seattle Thunderbirds	WHL	53	20	22	3	—	2805	175	1	3.74	.896	5	1	4	278	18	0	3.88	.922
1998–99	Seattle Thunderbirds	WHL	64	34	16	1	—	3670	177	7	2.89	.920	11	5	6	637	31	1	2.92	.933
1999–00	Peoria Rivermen	ECHL	10	6	4	0	—	599	32	0	3.20	.875	2	1	1	119	6	0	3.02	.860
1999–00	Worcester IceCats	AHL	28	9	7	6	—	1405	75	0	3.20	.895	—	—	—	—	—	—	—	—
2000–01	Worcester IceCats	AHL	25	13	8	3	—	1477	66	3	2.68	.915	—	—	—	—	—	—	—	—
2001–02	Peoria Rivermen	ECHL	12	5	2	4	—	709	24	3	2.03	.919	2	0	1	78	4	0	3.08	.902
2001–02	Worcester IceCats	AHL	21	6	10	2	—	1108	50	1	2.71	.907	—	—	—	—	—	—	—	—
2002–03	St. Louis Blues	NHL	1	1	0	0	—	31	0	0	0.00	1.000	—	—	—	—	—	—	—	—
2002–03	Trenton Titans	ECHL	31	17	9	5	—	1867	85	2	2.73	.911	3	0	3	178	14	0	4.72	.833
2002–03	Worcester IceCats	AHL	10	1	5	3	—	577	28	0	2.91	.897	—	—	—	—	—	—	—	—
2003–04	Worcester IceCats	AHL	1	0	0	0	—	49	3	0	3.67	.842	1	0	1	58	2	0	2.07	.933
2003–04	Reading Royals	ECHL	46	24	18	4	—	2728	108	1	2.38	.926	14	8	6	834	28	1	2.02	.937
2004–05	Reading Royals	ECHL	20	8	11	1	—	1163	42	3	2.17	.919	—	—	—	—	—	—	—	—
2004–05	Providence Bruins	AHL	14	4	7	2	—	730	39	0	3.20	.898	—	—	—	—	—	—	—	—
2005–06	Reading Royals	ECHL	38	24	11	—	3	2292	96	2	2.51	.916	1	0	0	5	0	0	0.00	1.000
2005–06	Bridgeport Sound Tigers	AHL	9	5	2	—	1	494	17	0	2.07	.938	—	—	—	—	—	—	—	—
2006–07	Phoenix Roadrunners	ECHL	38	10	22	—	2	2062	120	1	3.49	.905	4	0	4	249	16	0	3.86	.911
2007–08	Phoenix Roadrunners	ECHL	33	9	20	—	3	1867	121	1	3.89	.897	—	—	—	—	—	—	—	—
2007–08	Grand Rapids Griffins	AHL	2	0	1	—	0	14	2	0	8.40	.818	—	—	—	—	—	—	—	—
2007–08	Cincinnati Cyclones	ECHL	13	8	2	—	2	765	35	1	2.75	.899	—	—	—	—	—	—	—	—
2008–09	Stony Plain Eagles	ChHL	13	—	—	—	—	—	—	—	2.35	.923	—	—	—	—	—	—	—	—
2009–10	Edinburgh Capitals	EIHL	55	—	—	—	—	—	206	0	3.62	.900	2	—	—	—	—	—	4.50	.873
2010–11	Stony Plain Eagles	ChHL	17	—	—	—	—	—	—	—	4.27	.890	—	—	—	—	—	—	—	—
NHL totals			1	489	392	33	91	59,879	2,515	77	2.52	.919	—	—	—	—	—	—	—	—

== Awards and achievements ==
- Four Broncos Memorial Trophy (WHL most valuable player) in 1999
- Named to the WHL West First All-Star Team in 1999

Preceded by Sergei Varlamov	Winner of the WHL Four Broncos Memorial Trophy; 1999	Succeeded by Brad Moran
