= Tim Smith (ice hockey) =

Canadian ice hockey player

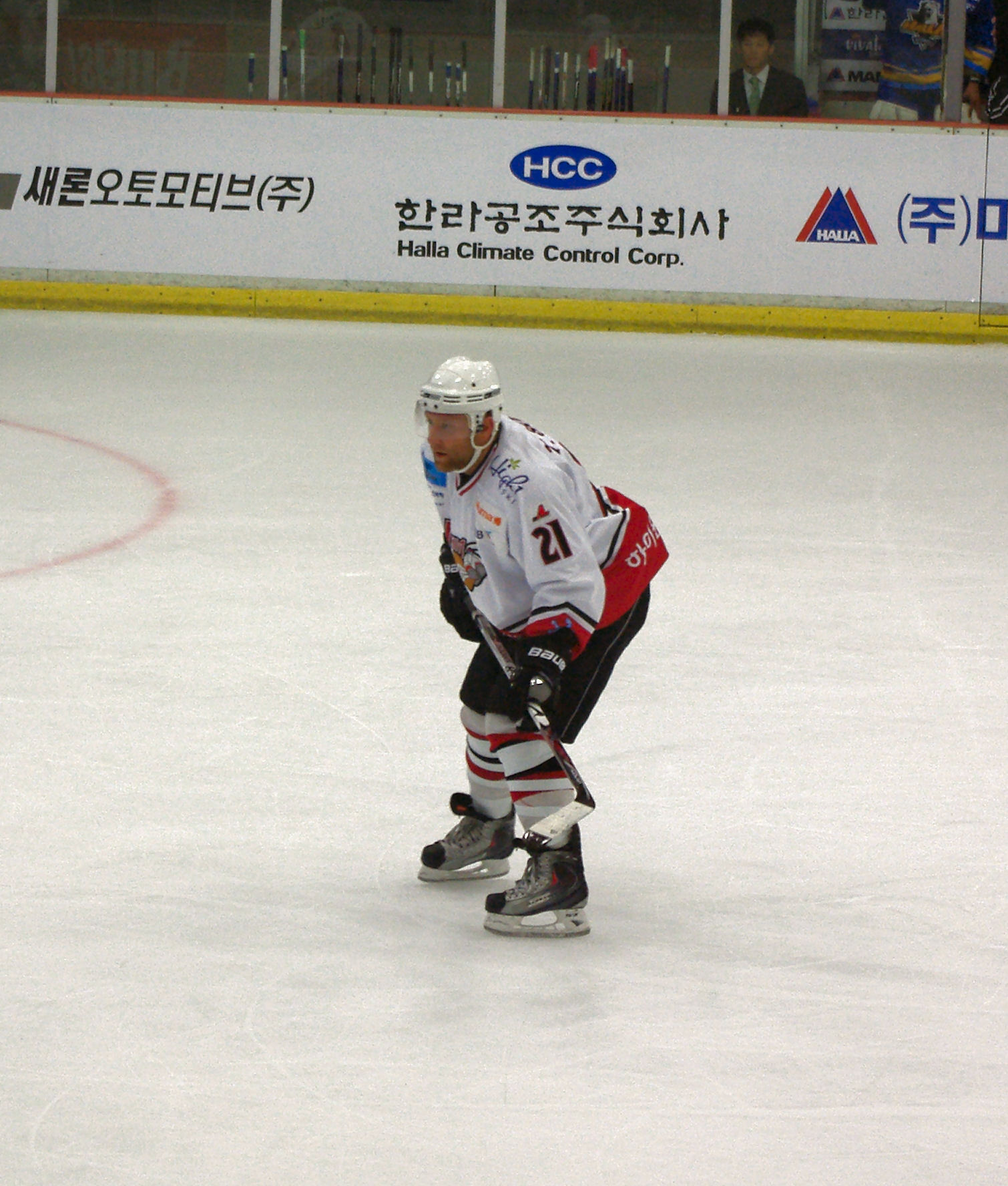
- Born: July 21, 1981 (age 44) Rochfort Bridge, Alberta, Canada
- Height: 5 ft 9 in (175 cm)
- Weight: 185 lb (84 kg; 13 st 3 lb)
- Position: Centre
- Shot: Left
- Played for: Columbia Inferno (ECHL); Manitoba Moose (AHL); EHC Freiburg (2Bun.); High1 (ALH); Lausanne HC (NLB); Tölzer Löwen (2Bun).
- NHL draft: 272nd overall, 2000; Vancouver Canucks
- Playing career: 2002–2011

Tim Smith (born July 21, 1981) is a Canadian former professional ice hockey forward who last played with High1 of the Asia League Ice Hockey.

== Playing career ==
Smith played major junior in the WHL for four seasons with the Spokane Chiefs and Swift Current Broncos. Despite a team-leading 96 points, fifth in league scoring, in his draft year, he was a late selection in the 2000 NHL entry draft, being selected 272nd overall by the Vancouver Canucks.

Smith turned pro in 2002–03, joining the Columbia Inferno of the ECHL. After a 59-point rookie campaign with the Inferno, he reeled off 95 points in 2003–04 to win the league scoring championship. His success in the ECHL was met with playing time in the AHL, as he split the following season between the Inferno and Manitoba Moose.

In 2005–06, Smith moved overseas to play in the German 2nd Bundesliga with EHC Freiburg. He scored at a point-per-game pace in his first season in Germany with 51 points in 51 games. In 2006-07 Smith moved to the Asian Hockey League. He played for Kangwon Land Ice Hockey Team. He played 33 games and finished the season with 60 points. In 2007-08 he returned to the Asian Hockey League to play for High 1. He played 30 games and finished the year with 46 points. Smith returned to Europe for the 2008–09 season and started in the Swiss B for Lausanne. He played 9 games and finished with 4 points. After his brief stint in the Swiss B he returned Germany to play in the 2nd Bundesliga with Tölzer Löwen. He finished that year with 35 games, 29 points.

On May 18, 2010, Smith signed an extension to return to High 1.

== Awards ==
Western Hockey League

- 1999–2000 West First All-Star Team

ECHL

Award	Year(s)
ECHL First Team All-Star	2003-04
ECHL Leading Scorer	2003-04
Reebok Plus Performer Of The Year (best plus/minus)	2003-04

Asia League

Award	Year(s)
Leading Goal Scorer	2007, 2008
Best Forward Of The Year	2008, 2010
Most Assists	2010
Leading Point Scorer	2010

== Career statistics ==
			Regular season					Playoffs
Season	Team	League	GP	G	A	Pts	PIM	GP	G	A	Pts	PIM
1997–98	Lebret Eagles	SJHL	36	6	7	13	12	—	—	—	—	—
1998–99	Spokane Chiefs	WHL	57	5	20	25	21	—	—	—	—	—
1999–2000	Spokane Chiefs	WHL	71	26	70	96	65	15	7	7	14	32
2000–01	Spokane Chiefs	WHL	38	19	36	55	65	—	—	—	—	—
2000–01	Swift Current Broncos	WHL	30	12	22	34	38	19	10	14	24	38
2001–02	Swift Current Broncos	WHL	67	28	47	75	123	12	7	6	13	20
2002–03	Columbia Inferno	ECHL	68	22	37	59	44	17	5	11	16	16
2002–03	Manitoba Moose	AHL	3	0	0	0	0	—	—	—	—	—
2003–04	Columbia Inferno	ECHL	69	33	62	95	112	—	—	—	—	—
2003–04	Manitoba Moose	AHL	1	0	0	0	0	—	—	—	—	—
2004–05	Manitoba Moose	AHL	29	4	0	4	6	—	—	—	—	—
2004–05	Columbia Inferno	ECHL	19	8	11	19	15	5	0	4	4	8
2005–06	Wölfe Freiburg	GER.2	51	18	33	51	73	—	—	—	—	—
2006–07	Kangwon Land	ALH	33	30	30	60	113	6	2	9	11	68
2007–08	High1	ALH	30	23	23	46	48	3	1	5	6	2
2008–09	Lausanne HC	SUI.2	9	3	1	4	4	—	—	—	—	—
2008–09	Tölzer Löwen	GER.2	35	13	16	29	58	—	—	—	—	—
2009–10	High1	ALH	35	27	48	75	50	4	1	4	5	4
2010–11	High1	ALH	36	16	29	45	34	—	—	—	—	—
2015–16	Innisfail Eagles	ChHL	3	1	1	2	0	3	1	0	1	4
ECHL totals			156	63	110	173	171	22	5	15	20	24
ALH totals			134	96	130	226	245	13	4	18	22	74
