= Prince George Cougars =

Western Hockey League team in Prince George, British Columbia

- City: Prince George, British Columbia
- League: Western Hockey League
- Conference: Western
- Division: B.C.
- Founded: 1971
- Home arena: CN Centre
- Colours: Red, bronze, white and black
- General manager: Mark Lamb
- Head coach: Mark Lamb
- Website: chl.ca/whl-cougars

Franchise history
- 1971–1994: Victoria Cougars
- 1994–present: Prince George Cougars

Current uniform

The Prince George Cougars are a Canadian major junior ice hockey team based in Prince George, British Columbia. Founded in 1971 as the Victoria Cougars, the team was relocated to Prince George in 1994, where it became the northernmost team in the Canadian Hockey League. The Cougars are members of the B.C. Division of the Western Conference in the Western Hockey League (WHL) and hosts games at the CN Centre.

== History ==
The Cougars were a long-running junior club based in Victoria when the team joined the Western Canada Hockey League in 1971, one of three teams based in British Columbia added to the WCHL that year to give the league a presence in all four Western Canadian provinces. The Cougars won one league title, in 1981, but in 1994, struggling with attendance and travel costs, were abruptly sold and moved to Prince George. The move made the Cougars the most remote team in the entire Canadian Hockey League (CHL), requiring drives of more than seven hours to play road games. The Prince George Cougars debuted in the 1994–95 season at the Prince George Coliseum until the construction of the team's own arena, the Multiplex, was completed in time for their second season.

The Cougars missed the playoffs in their first two seasons, but made two runs to the Division finals over the following four seasons, first finding success under coach Stan Butler. However, the Cougars missed the playoffs altogether seven times between 2003 and 2014, and sagging attendance led to the team being put up for sale, threatening relocation. In late 2013, owner Rick Brodsky initiated the sale process; local investor Greg Pocock sought the team, and partnered with former Cougars Dan Hamhuis and Eric Brewer to form an investors group committed to keeping the team in Prince George. The sale was approved by the WHL on April 30, 2014. The new ownership immediately sought to revitalize the team, renovating team facilities and seeking community partnerships. On the ice, the team won its first B.C. Division regular season title in 2016–17.

The team's most successful season came in 2023–24, with the Cougars setting franchise records with 49 wins and 102 points and entering the playoffs as the top-ranked team in the CHL, topping the WHL's Western Conference standings for the first time. Forwards Zac Funk and Riley Heidt both surpassed the previous scoring record for the team, with Funk setting a new mark with 123 points, along with a record 67 goals, and Heidt posting a record 80 assists. In the playoffs, the team advanced to the Western Conference final for the first time since 2007, where they faced the Portland Winterhawks. The Cougars lost the series in six games, with the sixth game ending in the second overtime period—the longest game in Cougars history. After the season, coach and manager Mark Lamb was named the WHL's coach and executive of the year.

== Uniforms and logos ==
The Cougars colours have traditionally been red, white, and black, and the logo has featured a variation on designs of a cougar. After the team was sold in 2014, the team unveiled a new logo featuring a cougar in the negative space of the letter C, and uniforms that introduced gold into the colour scheme.

Like many junior teams, the Cougars have often adopted special-event or limited-edition jerseys. In 2024, they released an Indigenous-inspired jersey designed by local partners.

== Season-by-season record ==
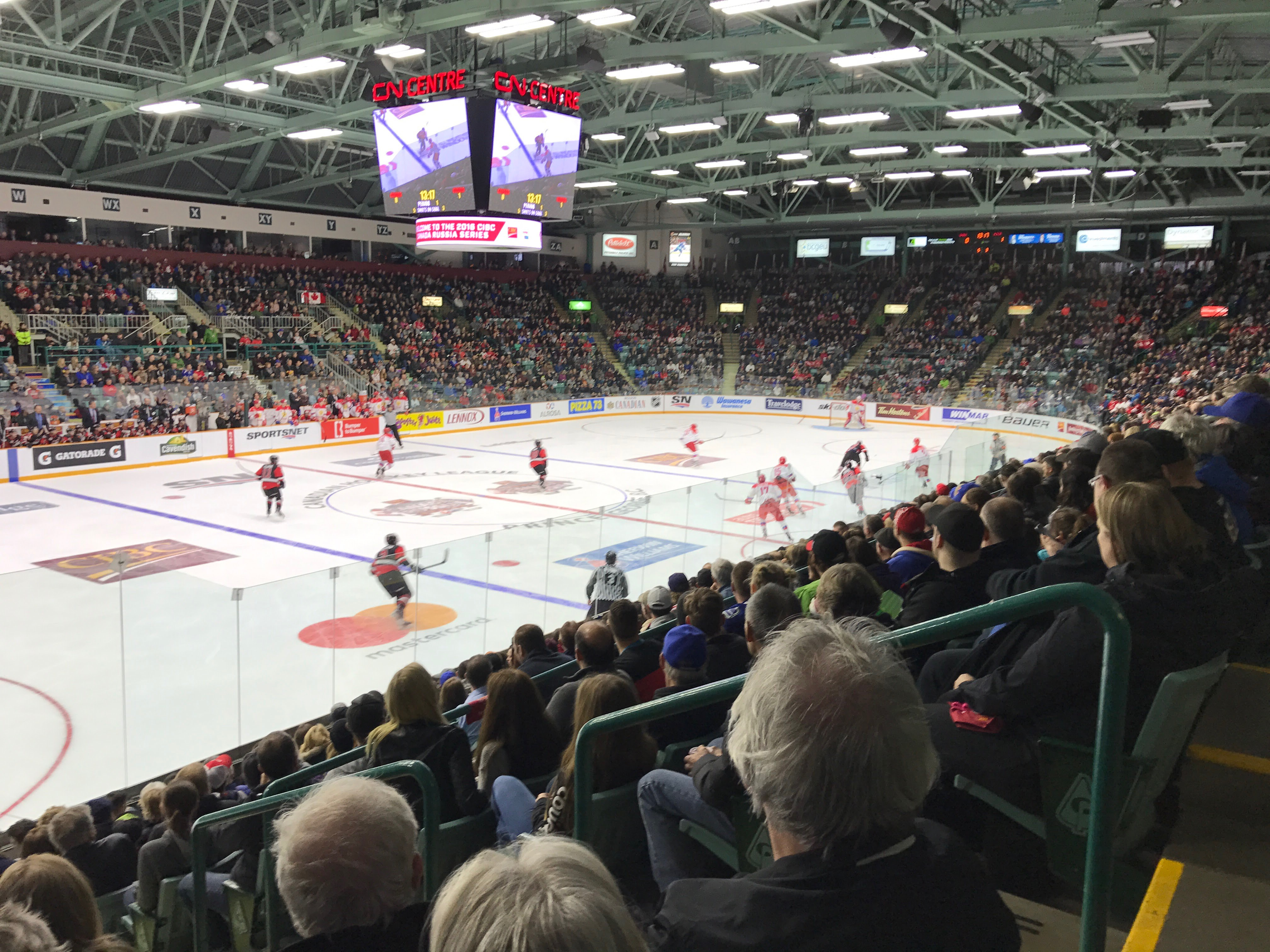
The Cougars play their games at the CN Centre.

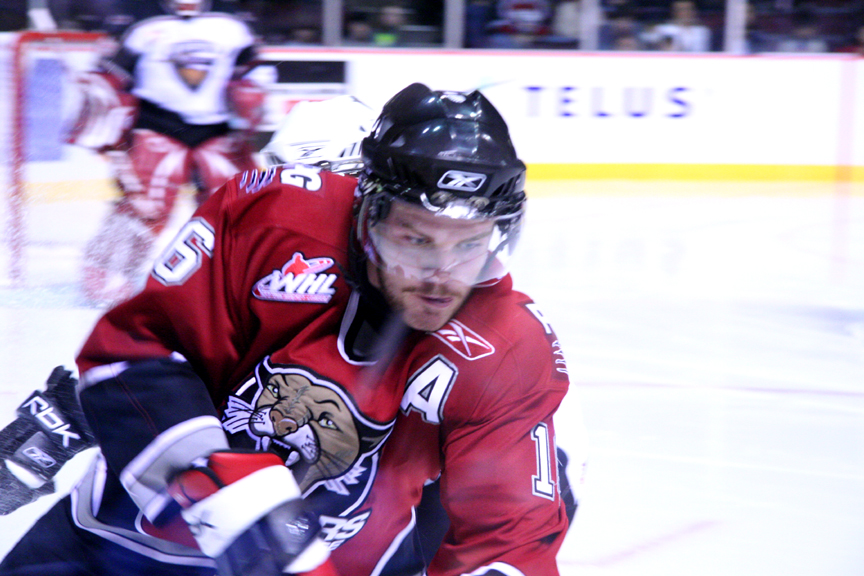
Jared Walker played for the Cougars between 2005 and 2007.

Note: GP = Games played, W = Wins, L = Losses, T = Ties, OTL = Overtime losses, GF = Goals for, GA = Goals against

Season	GP	W	L	T	OTL	GF	GA	Points	Finish	Playoffs
1994–95	72	14	55	3	-	229	392	31	7th West	Did not qualify
1995–96	72	17	53	2	-	219	340	36	7th West	Did not qualify
1996–97	72	28	39	5	-	238	287	61	6th West	Lost West Division final
1997–98	72	43	24	5	-	311	236	91	3rd West	Lost West Division semifinal
1998–99	72	34	32	6	-	255	264	74	4th West	Lost West Division quarterfinal
1999–2000	72	43	20	4	5	279	228	95	2nd West	Lost West Division final
2000–01	72	31	33	4	4	242	266	70	5th West	Lost West Division quarterfinal
2001–02	72	34	27	9	2	244	215	79	3rd B.C.	Lost Western Conference quarterfinal
2002–03	72	26	41	3	2	257	317	57	5th B.C.	Lost Western Conference quarterfinal
2003–04	72	30	34	7	1	214	236	68	5th B.C.	Did not qualify
2004–05	72	26	41	3	2	158	223	57	5th B.C.	Did not qualify
Season	GP	W	L	OTL	SOL	GF	GA	Points	Finish	Playoffs
2005–06	72	35	31	2	4	195	195	76	4th B.C.	Lost Western Conference quarterfinal
2006–07	72	33	31	3	5	221	217	74	3rd B.C.	Lost Western Conference final
2007–08	72	20	48	1	3	172	304	44	5th B.C.	Did not qualify
2008–09	72	25	44	0	3	188	298	53	4th B.C.	Lost Western Conference quarterfinal
2009–10	72	12	56	1	3	172	327	28	5th B.C.	Did not qualify
2010–11	72	33	35	2	2	258	265	70	4th B.C.	Lost Western Conference quarterfinal
2011–12	72	24	46	0	2	166	357	50	5th B.C.	Did not qualify
2012–13	72	21	43	2	6	177	273	50	4th B.C.	Did not qualify
2013–14	72	27	35	3	5	238	305	62	4th B.C.	Did not qualify
2014–15	72	31	36	2	3	222	295	67	3rd B.C.	Lost Western Conference quarterfinal
2015–16	72	36	31	3	2	240	225	77	4th B.C.	Lost Western Conference quarterfinal
2016–17	72	45	21	3	3	253	201	96	1st B.C.	Lost Western Conference quarterfinal
2017–18	72	24	38	5	5	217	295	58	5th B.C.	Did not qualify
2018–19	68	19	41	5	3	152	237	46	5th B.C.	Did not qualify
2019–20	62	20	34	4	4	144	205	48	5th B.C.	Cancelled due to the COVID-19 pandemic
2020–21	22	9	10	2	1	57	62	21	4th B.C.	No playoffs held due to COVID-19 pandemic
2021–22	68	24	39	4	1	177	240	53	3rd B.C.	Lost Western Conference quarterfinal
2022–23	68	37	24	6	1	290	241	81	2nd B.C.	Lost Western Conference semifinal
2023–24	68	49	15	1	3	316	187	102	1st B.C.	Lost Western Conference final
2024–25	68	41	21	4	2	251	222	88	2nd B.C.	Lost Western Conference quarterfinal
2025–26	68	44	22	2	0	245	188	90	2nd B.C.	Lost Western Conference semifinal

=== WHL Championship history ===
- Regular season division titles (2): 2016-17, 2023-24

== NHL alumni ==
The following alumni of the Prince George Cougars have played in the National Hockey League.

- Blair Betts
- Alexandre Boikov
- Derek Boogaard
- Tyler Bouck
- Eric Brewer
- Dustin Byfuglien
- Zdeno Chara
- Dennis Cholowski
- Brett Connolly
- Jonathan Filewich
- Kyle Freadrich
- Brendan Guhle
- Dan Hamhuis
- Jansen Harkins
- Trent Hunter
- David Koci
- Joel Kwiatkowski
- Mike Leclerc
- Martin Marincin
- Chris Mason
- Vladimir Mihalik
- Ronald Petrovicky
- Justin Pogge
- Devin Setoguchi
- Nick Drazenovic
- Sheldon Souray
- Dana Tyrell
- Michael Wall
- Ty Wishart

== Team records ==
Team records for a single season
Statistic	Total	Season
Most points	102	2023–24
Most wins	49	2023–24
Longest point streak	19	2023–24
Most goals for	316	2023–24
Fewest goals for	158	2004–05
Fewest goals against	187	2023–24
Most goals against	392	1994–95

Individual player records for a single season
Statistic	Player	Total	Season
Most goals	Zac Funk	67	2023–24
Most assists	Riley Heidt	80	2023–24
Most points	Zac Funk	123	2023–24
Most points, rookie	Terik Parascak	105	2023–24
Most points, defenceman	Hudson Thornton	74	2023–24
Most shutouts (goalie)	Josh Ravensbergen	6	2023–24
Goalies = minimum 1500 minutes played

Career records
Statistic	Player	Total	Career
Most goals	Chase Witala	120	2011–2014
Most assists	Riley Heidt	195	2020–2024
Most points	Riley Heidt	280	2020–2024
Most points, defenceman	Hudson Thornton	196	2020–2024
Most games played	Greg Gardner	338	2003–2008

== Awards ==
Four Broncos Memorial Trophy (WHL player of the year)

- Dan Hamhuis: 2001–02

Jim Piggott Memorial Trophy (WHL rookie of the year)

- Brett Connolly: 2008–09

Bill Hunter Memorial Trophy (WHL top defenceman)

- Christian Chartier: 2000–01
- Dan Hamhuis: 2001–02

Brad Hornung Trophy (WHL most sportsmanship)

- Trent Hunter: 1999–00

Dunc McCallum Memorial Trophy (WHL coach of the year)

- Mark Lamb: 2023–24

== See also ==
- List of ice hockey teams in British Columbia
