= Columbia Inferno =

- City: Columbia, South Carolina
- League: ECHL
- Conference: American Conference
- Division: South Division
- Founded: 2001
- Operated: 2001–2008
- Home arena: Carolina Coliseum
- Colors: Red, yellow, black, white
- Owner(s): Ezra B. Riber, MD

Franchise history
- 2001–2008: Columbia Inferno

Championships
- Regular season titles: none
- Division titles: 3 (2002–03, 2003–04, 2004–05)
- Conference titles: 1 (2002–03)
- Kelly Cups: none

The Columbia Inferno were an ECHL team based in Columbia, South Carolina. Beginning in 2008, the team went on voluntary suspension awaiting construction of a new arena in suburban Lexington County, South Carolina. However, the ECHL dropped Columbia as a "future market" in June 2014. They played their home games at the Carolina Coliseum.

== History ==
The Inferno first took the ice in 2001 as an expansion team after a group of physicians dubbed the "Hockey Docs" sought to purchase a team. While officially unaffiliated in their first season, the Inferno soon reached a working relationship with the Manitoba Moose of the American Hockey League that turned into a formal affiliation the following season and later with Manitoba's National Hockey League affiliate, the Vancouver Canucks. On July 10, 2006, the team announced the end of their affiliation with the Moose and Canucks and announced a new affiliation with the Toronto Marlies (AHL) and the Toronto Maple Leafs (NHL) two days later.

=== Demise ===
The Inferno was originally slated to move across the street to the Colonial Life Arena after the 2007–08 ECHL season, but legal issues with the arena's funding prevented the move. The team was voluntarily suspended for the 2008–09 season as the team was told that it could not be guaranteed a lease with the Carolina Coliseum in time to meet league requirements. The voluntary suspension was extended during subsequent seasons and, according to Joe Babik, the Director of Communications for the ECHL, included the 2012–13 season.

However, as of the 2013–14 season the team had not returned since its 2008 suspension. A March 2014 article in the Charleston-based The Post and Courier indicated team owner Ezra Riber was no longer required by the league to pay ECHL franchise fees. Acknowledging his long term personal and financial commitment to the league, the BOG voted that he cease paying dues while affirming their interest in Dr. Riber bringing hockey back to Columbia. The team was not included in the June 2014 ECHL realignment for the 2014–15 season. Columbia was removed as a "future market" by the ECHL shortly thereafter.

== Season-by-season records ==
Note: GP = Games played, W = Wins, L = Losses, T = Ties, OTL = Overtime losses, Pts = Points, GF = Goals for, GA = Goals against, PIM = Penalties in minutes

Season	GP	W	L	T	OTL	Pts	GF	GA	PIM	Finish	Playoffs
2001–02	72	36	22	14	—	86	211	197	1618	3rd in Southeast	Lost Div. Semifinals vs. Pee Dee Pride
2002–03	72	47	23	2	—	96	265	202	1158	1st in Southeast	Lost Finals, 1-4 vs. Atlantic City Boardwalk Bullies
2003–04	72	44	20	—	8	96	275	217	1855	1st in South	Lost Div. Semifinals, 1-3 vs. South Carolina Stingrays
2004–05	72	38	22	—	12	88	199	186	1333	1st in East	Lost Conf. Quarterfinals, 2-3 vs. Charlotte Checkers
2005–06	72	25	39	—	8	58	209	290	1596	7th in South	did not qualify
2006–07	72	29	34	—	9	67	214	247	1316	7th in South	did not qualify
2007–08	72	33	28	—	11	77	212	217	1171	5th in South	Lost Conf. Semifinals, 2-3 vs. South Carolina Stingrays

=== Team captains ===
- 2007–2008
  - C – Brad Ralph
    - A – Patrick Wellar
    - A – Tyson Marsh
    - A – Mac Faulkner
    - A – Jeff Miles
    - A – Donny Grover
    - A – Steve McJannet
- 2006–2007
  - C – Chris Thompson
  - C – Brad Ralph
    - A – Mike Vellinga
    - A – Tyson Marsh
    - A – Jeff Miles
    - A – Brad Ralph
- 2005–2006
  - C – Jay Legault
    - A – Leon Hayward
    - A – Derek Eastman
- 2004–2005
  - C – Trevor Demmans
    - A – Brad Ralph
    - A – Matt Ulwelling
    - A – Kevin Hopke
    - A – Robin Carruthers
- 2003–2004
  - C – Barrie Moore
    - A – Dennis Vial
    - A – Sean Owens
    - A – Robin Carruthers
- 2002-2003
  - C – Barrie Moore
    - A – Dennis Vial
    - A – Corey Hessler

=== Coaching history ===
Coach	Tenure	W	L	OTL
Scott White	2001–2005	165	87	36
Ted Dent	2005–2006	25	39	8
Troy Mann	2006–2008	62	62	20

== NHL alumni ==
List of Columbia Inferno alumni who played over 25 games in the ECHL and 25 or more games in the National Hockey League.

- Eric Boulton
- Alexandre Burrows
- Barrie Moore
- Bryan Rodney
- Dennis Vial

== Notable players ==
- Patrick Couture (ECHL 2002–03 Second Team All-Star)
- Tim Smith (ECHL 2003-04 Leading Scorer)
- Rejean Stringer (ECHL 2002-03 Sportsmanship Award)
