= Bryce Wandler =

Canadian ice hockey player

- Born: February 25, 1979 (age 46) Lacombe, Alberta, Canada
- Height: 6 ft 0 in (183 cm)
- Weight: 183 lb (83 kg; 13 st 1 lb)
- Position: Goaltender
- Caught: Left
- Played for: AHL; Hartford Wolf Pack; UHL; New Haven Knights; ECHL; Charlotte Checkers; Lexington Men O' War; CHL; San Angelo Saints
- NHL draft: Undrafted
- Playing career: 2000–2003

Bryce Wandler (born February 25, 1979) is a Canadian former professional ice hockey goaltender.

Wandler played major junior hockey in the Western Hockey League from 1996 to 2000. He was rewarded for his outstanding play during the 1999–2000 WHL season by being awarded the Del Wilson Trophy as the league's top goaltender. Wandler was also named to the 1999–2000 Canadian Hockey League Second All-Star Team.

Wandler went on to play three seasons (2000 – 2003) of professional hockey in the North American minor leagues.

Following his retirement from professional hockey, Wandler continued to play senior AAA hockey with the Bentley Generals of the Chinook Hockey League.

== Awards and honours ==
Award	Year
Del Wilson Trophy - WHL Goaltender of the Year	1999–2000
WHL East First Team All-Star	1999–2000
Canadian Hockey League Second All-Star Team	1999–2000
