= 1998–99 WHL season =

Junior ice hockey season

- League: Western Hockey League
- Sport: Ice hockey
- Teams: 18

Regular season
- Scotty Munro Memorial Trophy: Calgary Hitmen (1)
- Season MVP: Cody Rudkowsky (Seattle Thunderbirds)
- Top scorer: Pavel Brendl (Calgary Hitmen)

Playoffs
- Playoffs MVP: Brad Moran (Hitmen)
- Finals champions: Calgary Hitmen (1)
- Runners-up: Kamloops Blazers

WHL seasons
- 1997–98 1999–2000

1998–99 CHL season
- League: Canadian Hockey League
- Sport: Ice hockey
- Teams: 53

OHL

QMJHL

WHL

Memorial Cup
- Finals champions: Ottawa 67's (OHL) (2nd title)
- Runners-up: Calgary Hitmen (WHL)

The 1998–99 WHL season was the 33rd season of the Western Hockey League (WHL). The season featured eighteen teams and a 72-game season. The Calgary Hitmen won both the Scotty Munro Memorial Trophy for posting the best regular season record and the President's Cup as playoff champions, both for the first time in team history. They thus earned a berth in the 1999 Memorial Cup tournament, where they lost the final to the Ottawa 67's.

Prior to the season, the Edmonton Ice relocated to Cranbrook, British Columbia and became the Kootenay Ice.

== Regular season ==
Map of WHL, 1998–97 to 2000–01
East Division
Central Division
West Division

=== Final standings ===
East Division
Pos	Team	Pld	W	L	T	GF	GA	Pts
1	x – Prince Albert Raiders	72	45	22	5	288	213	95
2	x – Brandon Wheat Kings	72	39	29	4	293	267	82
3	x – Moose Jaw Warriors	72	39	31	2	292	262	80
4	x – Swift Current Broncos	72	34	32	6	232	211	74
5	Regina Pats	72	24	43	5	238	312	53
6	Saskatoon Blades	72	16	49	7	184	291	39

x – qualified for playoffs

Central Division
Pos	Team	Pld	W	L	T	GF	GA	Pts
1	x – Calgary Hitmen	72	51	13	8	319	187	110
2	x – Red Deer Rebels	72	34	33	5	274	250	73
3	x – Lethbridge Hurricanes	72	31	32	9	224	215	71
4	x – Kootenay Ice	72	30	35	7	245	276	67
5	Medicine Hat Tigers	72	15	56	1	185	323	31

x – qualified for playoffs

West Division
Pos	Team	Pld	W	L	T	GF	GA	Pts
1	x – Kamloops Blazers	72	48	11	13	298	195	109
2	x – Tri-City Americans	72	43	23	6	311	219	92
3	x – Seattle Thunderbirds	72	37	24	11	279	236	85
4	x – Prince George Cougars	72	34	32	6	255	264	74
5	x – Portland Winter Hawks	72	23	36	13	215	278	59
6	x – Kelowna Rockets	72	25	42	5	241	282	55
7	Spokane Chiefs	72	19	44	9	193	268	47

x – qualified for playoffs

=== Scoring leaders ===
Note: GP = Games played; G = Goals; A = Assists; Pts = Points; PIM = Penalties in minutes

Player	Team	GP	G	A	Pts	PIM
Pavel Brendl	Calgary Hitmen	68	73	61	134	40
Brad Moran	Calgary Hitmen	71	60	58	118	96
Dylan Gyori	Tri-City Americans	69	53	65	118	112
Chad Hinz	Moose Jaw Warriors	71	42	75	117	40
Scott Gomez	Tri-City Americans	58	30	78	108	55
Shawn McNeil	Red Deer Rebels	72	44	59	103	87
Brett McLean	Kelowna/Brandon	65	47	54	101	66
Bret DeCecco	Seattle Thunderbirds	72	57	43	100	81
Ryan Robson	Brandon Wheat Kings	72	33	61	94	35
Oleg Saprykin	Seattle Thunderbirds	66	47	46	93	107

=== Goaltending leaders ===
Note: GP = Games played; Min = Minutes played; W = Wins; L = Losses; T = Ties; GA = Goals against; SO = Total shutouts; SV% = Save percentage; GAA = Goals against average

Player	Team	GP	Min	W	L	T	GA	SO	SV%	GAA
Kenric Exner	Kamloops Blazers	51	2967	34	6	8	114	5	.912	2.31
Bryce Wandler	Swift Current Broncos	51	2885	23	20	4	123	3	.905	2.56
Alexander Fomichev	Calgary Hitmen	57	3321	39	10	7	142	4	.901	2.57
Evan Lindsay	Prince Albert Raiders	56	3336	34	16	5	158	1	.905	2.84
Cody Rudkowsky	Seattle Thunderbirds	64	3670	34	17	10	177	7	.920	2.89

== 1999 WHL Playoffs ==
- Top eight teams in the Eastern Conference (East and Central divisions) qualified for playoffs
- Top six teams in the Western Conference (division) qualified for the playoffs

First round
C1	Calgary	4
C4	Kootenay	3
E2	Brandon	1
C2	Red Deer	4
E1	Prince Albert	4
C3	Lethbridge	0
E3	Moose Jaw	4
E4	Swift Current	2
W1	Kamloops	4
W6	Kelowna	2
W2	Tri-City	4
W5	Portland	0
W3	Seattle	4
W4	Prince George	3

Division Semi-Finals
C1	Calgary	4
C2	Red Deer	0
E1	Prince Albert	4
E3	Moose Jaw	1
W1	Kamloops	bye
W2	Tri-City	3
W3	Seattle	1

Division Finals
C1	Calgary	4
E1	Prince Albert	1
W1	Kamloops	4
W2	Tri-City	0

WHL Championship
C1	Calgary	4
W1	Kamloops	1

=== Conference quarterfinals ===
==== Eastern Conference ====
Calgary vs. Kootenay
Date	Away	Home	
March 24	Kootenay 5	7 Calgary	
March 26	Calgary 3	6 Kootenay	
March 27	Calgary 4	5 Kootenay	OT
March 29	Kootenay 2	5 Calgary	
March 31	Kootenay 2	3 Calgary	
April 1	Calgary 3	4 Kootenay	
April 2	Kootenay 3	8 Calgary	
Calgary wins series 4–3

Moose Jaw vs. Swift Current
Date	Away	Home	
March 25	Swift Current 2	3 Moose Jaw	
March 26	Swift Current 2	4 Moose Jaw	
March 28	Moose Jaw 3	4 Swift Current	OT
March 30	Moose Jaw 5	3 Swift Current	
March 31	Swift Current 2	0 Moose Jaw	
April 2	Moose Jaw 3	2 Swift Current	
Moose Jaw wins series 4–2

Prince Albert vs. Lethbridge
Date	Away	Home
March 24	Lethbridge 1	7 Prince Albert
March 26	Lethbridge 2	3 Prince Albert
March 27	Prince Albert 11	2 Lethbridge
March 29	Prince Albert 4	1 Lethbridge
Prince Albert wins series 4–0

Red Deer vs. Brandon
Date	Away	Home
March 24	Red Deer 5	2 Brandon
March 25	Red Deer 5	1 Brandon
March 27	Brandon 5	9 Red Deer
March 28	Brandon 4	3 Red Deer
March 30	Red Deer 7	3 Brandon
Red Deer wins series 4–1

==== Western Conference ====
Kamloops vs. Kelowna
Date	Away	Home
March 25	Kelowna 0	2 Kamloops
March 36	Kelowna 1	3 Kamloops
March 30	Kamloops 1	3 Kelowna
April 1	Kamloops 3	1 Kelowna
April 3	Kelowna 4	3 Kamloops
April 4	Kamloops 3	2 Kelowna
Kamloops wins series 4–2

Tri-City vs. Portland
Date	Away	Home	
March 26	Portland 3	4 Tri-City	OT
March 27	Portland 2	6 Tri-City	
March 31	Tri-City 3	2 Portland	OT
April 2	Tri-City 6	2 Portland	
Tri-City wins series 4–0

Seattle vs. Prince George
Date	Away	Home
March 27	Prince George 2	5 Seattle
March 28	Prince George 1	3 Seattle
March 30	Seattle 4	5 Prince George
March 31	Seattle 3	2 Prince George
April 3	Prince George 3	1 Seattle
April 5	Seattle 1	4 Prince George
April 7	Prince George 0	6 Seattle
Seattle wins series 4–3

=== Conference semifinals ===
Eastern Conference

Calgary vs. Red Deer
Date	Away	Home	
April 5	Red Deer 3	6 Calgary	
April 6	Calgary 4	3 Red Deer	OT
April 8	Red Deer 2	4 Calgary	
April 9	Calgary 3	1 Red Deer	
Calgary wins series 4–0

Prince Albert vs. Moose Jaw
Date	Away	Home
April 5	Moose Jaw 1	5 Prince Albert
April 6	Moose Jaw 2	5 Prince Albert
April 8	Prince Albert 6	0 Moose Jaw
April 9	Prince Albert 3	4 Moose Jaw
April 11	Moose Jaw 3	8 Prince Albert
Prince Albert wins series 4–1

Western Conference

Tri-City vs. Seattle
Date	Away	Home
April 9	Seattle 4	3 Tri-City
April 10	Seattle 0	6 Tri-City
April 12	Tri-City 4	0 Seattle
April 13	Tri-City 4	2 Seattle
Tri-City wins series 3–1

Kamloops earns bye

=== Conference finals ===
Eastern Conference

Calgary vs. Prince Albert
Date	Away	Home	
April 16	Prince Albert 3	7 Calgary	
April 18	Prince Albert 4	5 Calgary	OT
April 20	Calgary 5	6 Prince Albert	
April 22	Calgary 7	1 Prince Albert	
April 24	Prince Albert 2	6 Calgary	
Calgary wins series 4–1

Western Conference

Kamloops vs. Tri-City
Date	Away	Home	
April 17	Tri-City 3	4 Kamloops	
April 18	Tri-City 0	6 Kamloops	
April 21	Kamloops 3	2 Tri-City	OT
April 22	Kamloops 4	3 Tri-City	
Kamloops wins series 4–0

=== WHL Championship ===
Calgary vs. Kamloops
Date	Away	Home	
April 30	Kamloops 4	2 Calgary	
May 2	Kamloops 0	4 Calgary	
May 4	Calgary 4	2 Kamloops	
May 5	Calgary 4	3 Kamloops	2OT
May 7	Kamloops 2	5 Calgary	
Calgary wins series 4–1

== All-Star game ==
On January 20, the Western Conference defeated the Eastern Conference 11–9 at Lethbridge, Alberta before a crowd of 5,071.

== WHL awards ==
Player of the Year - Four Broncos Memorial Trophy: Cody Rudkowsky, Seattle Thunderbirds
Scholastic Player of the Year - Daryl K. (Doc) Seaman Trophy: Chris Nielson, Calgary Hitmen
Top Scorer - Bob Clarke Trophy: Pavel Brendl, Calgary Hitmen
Most Sportsmanlike Player - Brad Hornung Trophy: Matt Kinch, Calgary Hitmen
Top Defenseman - Bill Hunter Trophy: Brad Stuart, Calgary Hitmen
Rookie of the Year - Jim Piggott Memorial Trophy: Pavel Brendl, Calgary Hitmen
Top Goaltender - Del Wilson Trophy: Cody Rudkowsky, Seattle Thunderbirds
Coach of the Year - Dunc McCallum Memorial Trophy: Don Hay, Tri-City Americans
Executive of the Year - Lloyd Saunders Memorial Trophy: Don Hay, Tri-City Americans
Regular season champions - Scotty Munro Memorial Trophy: Calgary Hitmen
Top Official - Allen Paradice Memorial Trophy: Kelly Sutherland
Marketing/Public Relations Award - St. Clair Group Trophy: Scott Clark, Regina Pats
WHL Humanitarian of the Year: Andrew Ference, Portland Winter Hawks
WHL Plus-Minus Award: Pavel Brendl, Calgary Hitmen
WHL Playoff Most Valuable Player: Brad Moran, Calgary Hitmen

== All-Star teams ==
Eastern Conference
	First Team		Second Team	
Goal	Alexander Fomichev	Calgary Hitmen	Evan Lindsay	Prince Albert Raiders
Defense	Brad Stuart	Calgary Hitmen	Kurt Drummond	Swift Current Broncos
Defense	Matt Kinch	Calgary Hitmen	Burke Henry	Brandon Wheat Kings
Forward	Pavel Brendl	Calgary Hitmen	Brad Leeb	Red Deer Rebels
Forward	Brad Moran	Calgary Hitmen	Jamie Lundmark	Moose Jaw Warriors
Forward	Chad Hinz	Moose Jaw Warriors	Brett Lysak	Regina Pats
Western Conference
	First Team		Second Team	
Goal	Cody Rudkowsky	Seattle Thunderbirds	Kenric Exner	Kamloops Blazers
Defense	Robyn Regehr	Kamloops Blazers	Andrew Ference	Portland Winter Hawks
Defense	Scott Hannan	Kelowna Rockets	Garry Toor	Prince George Cougars
Forward	Scott Gomez	Tri-City Americans	Ajay Baines	Kamloops Blazers
Forward	Dylan Gyori	Tri-City Americans	Bret DeCecco	Seattle Thunderbirds
Forward	Brenden Morrow	Portland Winter Hawks	Oleg Saprykin	Seattle Thunderbirds

== See also ==
- 1999 NHL entry draft
- 1998 in sports
- 1999 in sports

Preceded by 1997–98 WHL season	WHL seasons	Succeeded by 1999–2000 WHL season
