= Craig Cunningham =

Canadian ice hockey player (born 1990)

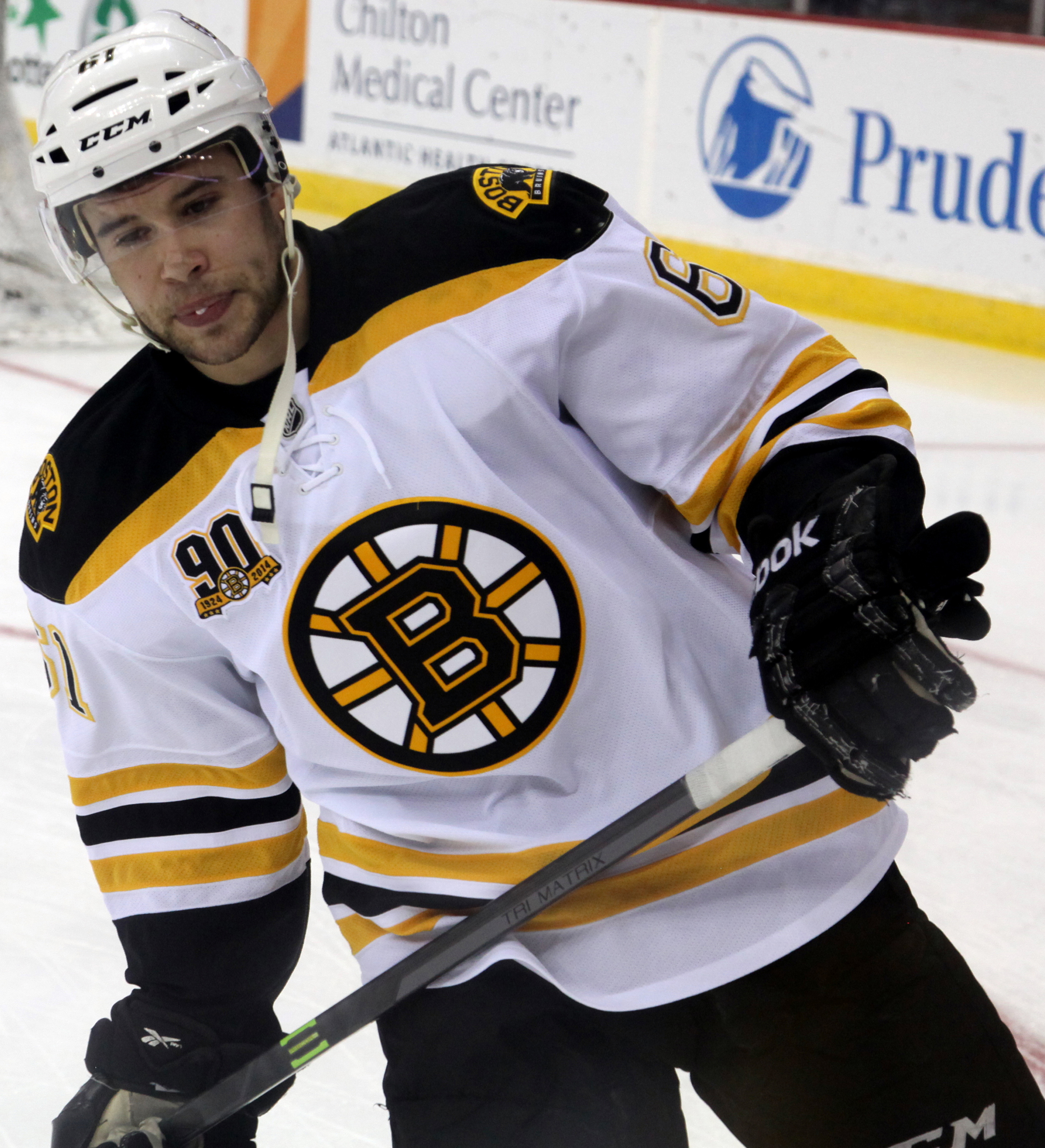
- Cunningham with the Boston Bruins in 2014
- Born: September 13, 1990 (age 35) Trail, British Columbia, Canada
- Height: 5 ft 10 in (178 cm)
- Weight: 184 lb (83 kg; 13 st 2 lb)
- Position: Centre
- Shot: Right
- Played for: Boston Bruins; Arizona Coyotes
- NHL draft: 97th overall, 2010; Boston Bruins
- Playing career: 2011–2016

Craig Alvin Cunningham (born September 13, 1990) is a Canadian former professional ice hockey centre who played with the Boston Bruins and Arizona Coyotes in the National Hockey League (NHL). He was selected by the Boston Bruins, 97th overall in the 2010 NHL entry draft, before being called up to the Bruins in December 2013.

During his junior Western Hockey League (WHL) career, he won a Memorial Cup with the Vancouver Giants as a rookie in 2007 and was named to the WHL West First All-Star Team in 2010. He left the Giants as the team's all-time games played leader.

Cunningham played 63 NHL games across both the Bruins and Coyotes before being forced to prematurely retire in late 2016 after going into cardiac arrest during a Tucson Roadrunners pre-game skate, forcing his lower left leg to be amputated. Cunningham currently serves as a pro scout for the Vegas Golden Knights, as well as assists in player development.

== Playing career ==
=== Junior ===
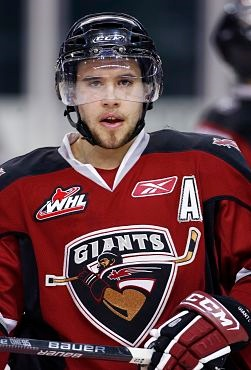
Cunningham as a member of the Vancouver Giants.

Cunningham was selected into the Western Hockey League (WHL) 129th overall by the Vancouver Giants in the 2005 WHL Bantam Draft. He began his major junior career with the Giants in 2006–07, recording five assists over 48 games as a rookie. He then appeared in 15 WHL playoff games en route to a President's Cup and Memorial Cup with the Giants as WHL and Canadian Hockey League (CHL) champions. Over the next two seasons, he improved to 25- and 50-point campaigns.

Eligible for the 2009 NHL entry draft, Cunningham went unselected. He was subsequently invited by the New York Rangers on a tryout basis to their 2009 Traverse City Prospects Tournament.

Entering his fourth WHL season with the Giants in 2009–10, Cunningham quickly moved up the Giants depth chart as former teammates Evander Kane and James Wright made their respective NHL teams. He was placed on the top line centring team captain Lance Bouma and Brendan Gallagher. Finishing the season with a junior career-high 97 points (37 goals and 60 assists), he ranked first in team scoring and sixth in the league. The total was also the second-highest for a Giants player in a single-season, coming 18 points short of Casey Pierro-Zabotel's record, set the previous year. He was nominated for the Four Broncos Memorial Trophy as WHL Player of the Year, losing to Eastern Conference nominee Jordan Eberle of the Regina Pats. Cunningham was also named to the WHL West First All-Star Team as a unanimous selection, along with Giants teammate Kevin Connauton.

In game two of the opening round of the 2010 WHL playoffs, Cunningham recorded a five-point game (two goals and three assists) in a 6–3 win over the Kamloops Blazers. Two days later, on March 22, 2010, he was named the WHL Player of the Week, finish with four goals and seven points in two games. Two weeks later, on April 5, he received his second Player of the Week honour with three goals and three assists in the first two games of the second round against the Portland Winterhawks. The Giants advanced to the semifinals against the Tri-City Americans, but lost in six games. Cunningham finished the playoffs with 12 goals and 24 points over 16 games.

During the off-season, Cunningham was ranked 108th among North American skaters for the 2010 NHL entry draft (his second draft-eligible year) by the NHL Central Scouting Bureau. He was drafted in the fourth round (97th overall) by the Boston Bruins.

On July 14, 2011, Cunningham signed an entry-level contract with the Boston Bruins. During training camp, he was assigned to Boston's minor league affiliate, the Providence Bruins of the American Hockey League (AHL). Returning to junior, he was chosen as the Giants' new team captain, replacing Bouma, who had turned professional. Through 36 games, Cunningham had recorded 10 goals and 45 points. Suffering through several injuries as a team, the Giants struggled in comparison to previous years. Leading up to the WHL trade deadline, the top-ranked Portland Winterhawks inquired about acquiring Cunningham to bolster their line-up for a deep playoff run. General manager Scott Bonner sought Cunningham's approval before finalizing the trade on December 28, 2010.

Cunningham was sent to Portland, along with a sixth round pick in the 2011 Bantam Draft, in exchange for Spencer Bennett, Teal Burns, a first round pick in the 2011 Bantam Draft and a second round pick in the 2012 Bantam Draft. In dealing away their captain, Giants head coach Don Hay recalled "I think the fans thought were giving up on the season by trading Craig." He left the Giants as the team's all-time leader in regular season games played with 295, having surpassed Mitch Bartley's mark of 285 contests earlier in the season. He quickly became a fan favourite in Portland earning himself the nickname "The Hamster" due to his small stature but tenacious spirit and leadership on the ice. Cunningham finished the season with 17 goals and 42 points over 35 games with the Winterhawks. During the playoffs, he added 7 goals and 21 points over 21 games, as the Winterhawks were eliminated in the Finals.

=== Professional ===
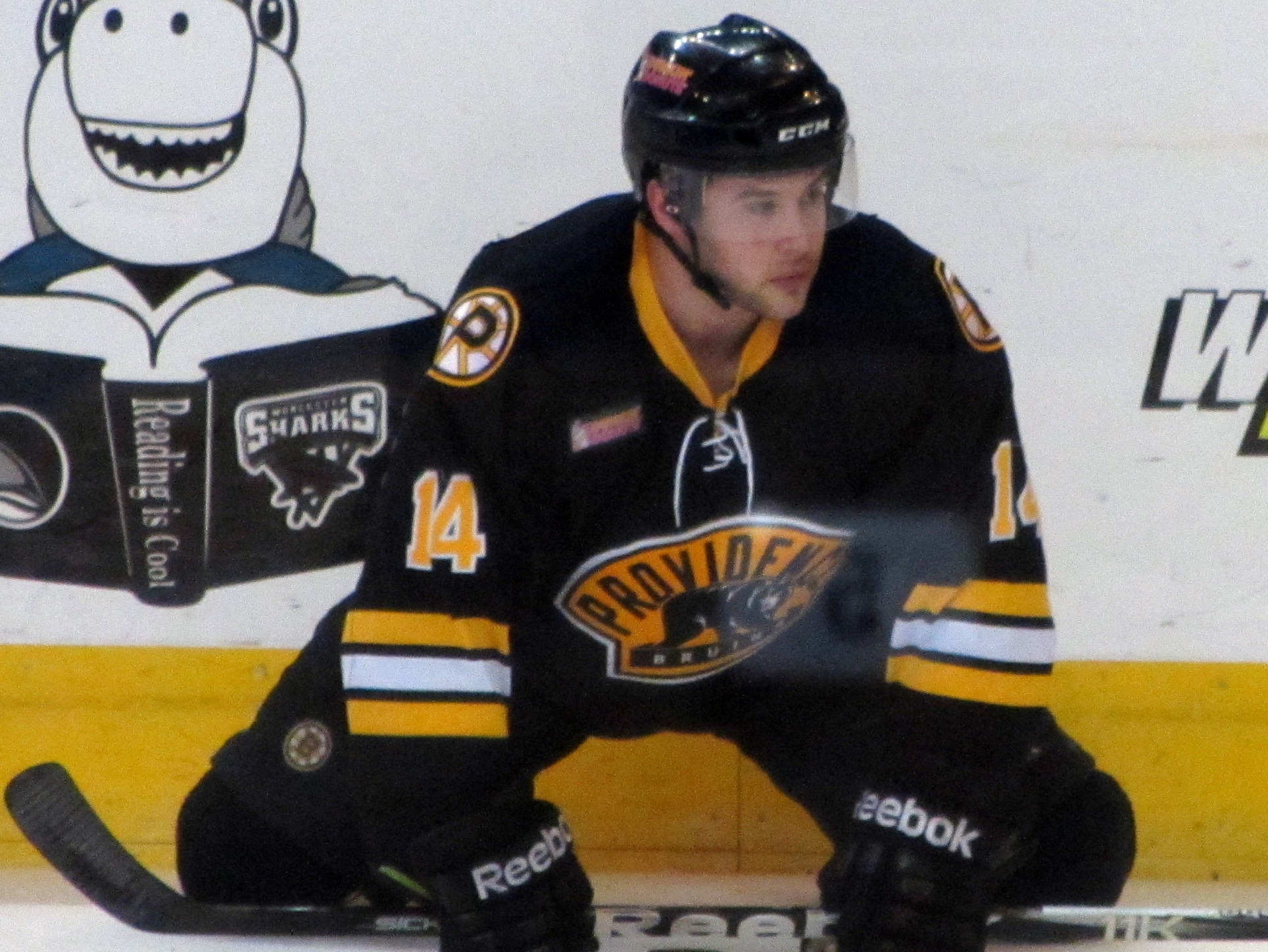
Cunningham as a member of the Providence Bruins.

In the 2013–14 season, Cunningham was called up to the Bruins for the first time on December 16, 2013. On December 17, 2013, he made his NHL debut with the Bruins. He finished the game against the Calgary Flames with four shots on net in 8:16 of ice time.

In the following 2014–15 season, on December 13, 2014, Cunningham scored his first NHL goal, a shorthanded goal against the Ottawa Senators. On March 2, 2015, Cunningham was placed on waivers and claimed by the Arizona Coyotes.

During the 2015–16 season, he primarily played in the AHL appearing in 61 games for the Springfield Falcons, tallying 46 points. He was recalled throughout the campaign to appear in 10 games with the Coyotes. On June 16, 2016, the Coyotes re-signed Cunningham to a one-year, two-way deal.

After attending the Coyotes 2016 training camp and pre-season, Cunningham was reassigned to AHL affiliate the Tucson Roadrunners, to begin their inaugural season in the 2016–17 season. In leading the Roadrunners offensively, Cunningham was selected to serve as the club's first captain on November 2, 2016. Cunningham collected 4 goals and 13 points in just 11 games before suffering his on-ice collapse and effectively ending his professional career. Nearing the completion of the season, Cunningham was awarded the prestigious Fred T. Hunt Memorial Award, given to the AHL player who best exemplifies the qualities of sportsmanship, determination and dedication to hockey.

== On-ice collapse and recovery ==
On November 19, 2016, Cunningham was hospitalized after collapsing on the ice during a pre-game skate prior to a Tucson Roadrunners contest against the Manitoba Moose in Tucson, Arizona. Cunningham suffered an acute cardiac arrest caused by ventricular fibrillation, causing his heart to stop beating and requiring 83 minutes of continual CPR in which an on ice medical team and staff at St. Mary's Hospital and Banner-University Medical Center effectively saved his life. In his recovery, Cunningham later addressed the media about the incident and his condition on December 21, 2016. After developing an infection due to circulation problems from his cardiac arrest, his lower left leg was amputated on December 24, 2016.

On March 25, 2017, four months after his collapse, Cunningham returned to the Roadrunners ice and was honored in delivering the ceremonial puck drop in a contest against the San Jose Barracuda. On May 24, 2017, the Coyotes signed Cunningham to a two-year contract as a pro scout. Cunningham also assisted in player development. On June 12, 2017, Cunningham's story was featured on ESPN's SC Featured: "Craig Cunningham Chooses Life Over Limb". Cunningham was reported to have made an extraordinary recovery following the amputation and is shown in the video returning to skating on the ice.

Cunningham's No. 14 jersey number was retired by the Roadrunners in a pregame ceremony on October 27, 2017.

== Career statistics ==
			Regular season					Playoffs
Season	Team	League	GP	G	A	Pts	PIM	GP	G	A	Pts	PIM
2006–07	Vancouver Giants	WHL	48	0	5	5	38	15	0	1	1	15
2007–08	Vancouver Giants	WHL	67	11	14	25	72	10	1	2	3	6
2008–09	Vancouver Giants	WHL	72	28	22	50	62	17	5	9	14	12
2009–10	Vancouver Giants	WHL	72	37	60	97	44	16	12	12	24	12
2010–11	Vancouver Giants	WHL	36	10	35	45	31	—	—	—	—	—
2010–11	Portland Winterhawks	WHL	35	17	25	42	25	21	7	14	21	12
2011–12	Providence Bruins	AHL	76	20	16	36	20	—	—	—	—	—
2012–13	Providence Bruins	AHL	75	25	21	46	26	12	3	5	8	4
2013–14	Providence Bruins	AHL	75	25	22	47	40	12	3	4	7	6
2013–14	Boston Bruins	NHL	2	0	0	0	0	—	—	—	—	—
2014–15	Boston Bruins	NHL	32	2	1	3	2	—	—	—	—	—
2014–15	Providence Bruins	AHL	21	5	10	15	8	—	—	—	—	—
2014–15	Arizona Coyotes	NHL	19	1	3	4	2	—	—	—	—	—
2015–16	Springfield Falcons	AHL	61	22	24	46	20	—	—	—	—	—
2015–16	Arizona Coyotes	NHL	10	0	1	1	2	—	—	—	—	—
2016–17	Tucson Roadrunners	AHL	11	4	9	13	6	—	—	—	—	—
NHL totals			63	3	5	8	6	—	—	—	—	—

== Awards and honours ==
Award	Year
WHL
Player of the Week – March 14, March 28	2010
West First All-Star Team	2010
AHL
Fred T. Hunt Memorial Award	2017
