= Wacey Rabbit =

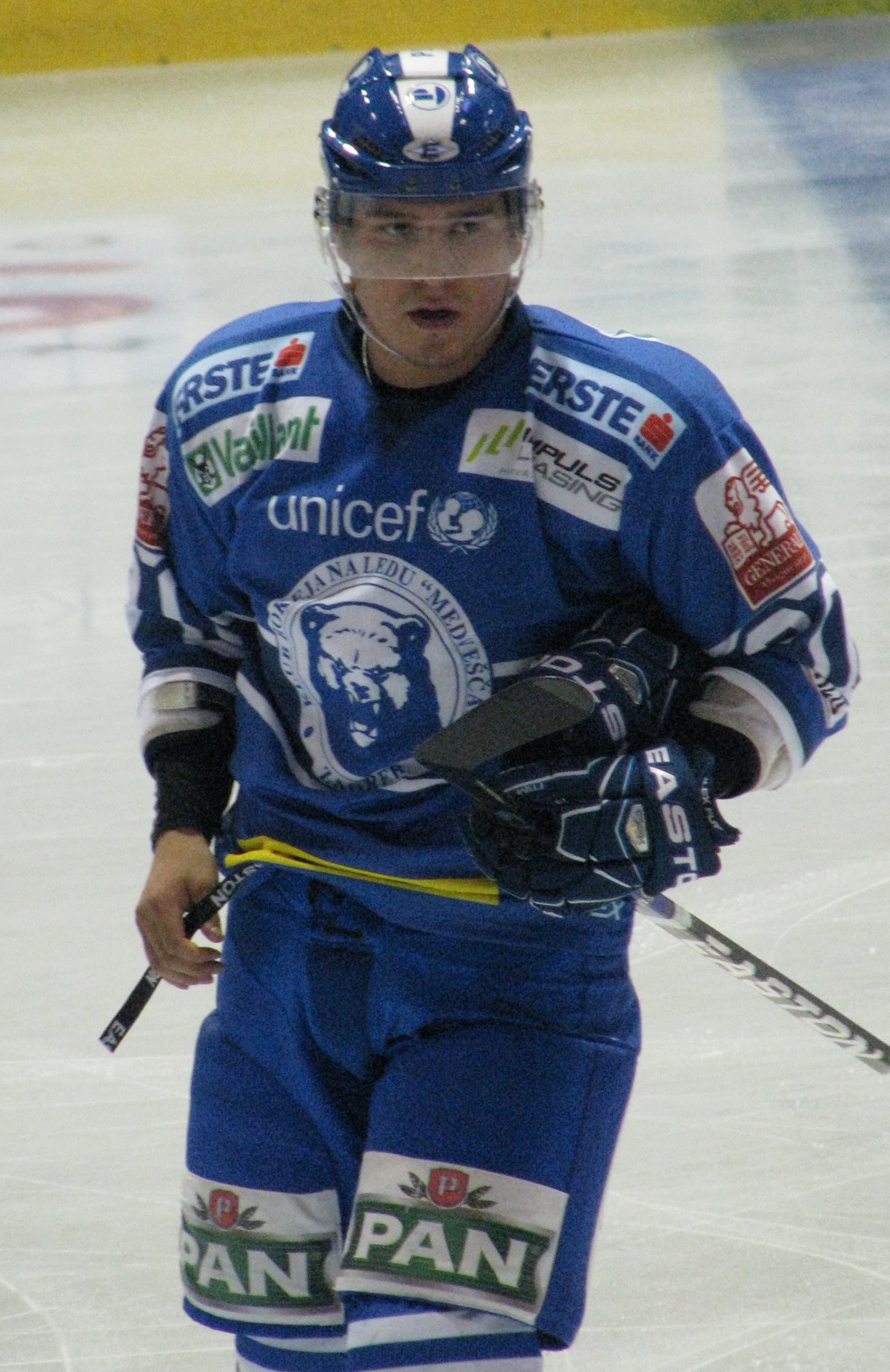
- Born: November 16, 1986 (age 39) Lethbridge, Alberta, Canada
- Height: 5 ft 9 in (175 cm)
- Weight: 185 lb (84 kg; 13 st 3 lb)
- Position: Centre
- Shot: Left
- Played for: Providence Bruins; Milwaukee Admirals; KHL Medveščak; San Antonio Rampage; Lørenskog IK; Nippon Paper Cranes; HC Pustertal Wölfe; HC Dukla Jihlava; ASC Corona Brașov
- NHL draft: 154th overall, 2005; Boston Bruins
- Playing career: 2006–2021

Wacey Rabbit (born November 16, 1986) is a Canadian former professional ice hockey centre who played in the American Hockey League (AHL) and current assistant coach of the Vancouver Giants of the Western Hockey League (WHL).

== Playing career ==
Rabbit played major junior in the Western Hockey League (WHL). During his draft year in 2004–05, he recorded 67 points and was then selected in the 5th round, 154th overall, by the Boston Bruins in the 2005 NHL entry draft. Rabbit turned pro in 2006–07 season with Boston's American Hockey League (AHL) affiliate, the Providence Bruins. However, after he was demoted to the ECHL in January, Vancouver Giants general manager Scott Bonner requested that the Boston Bruins send Rabbit back down to junior to bolster the Giants for the 2007 Memorial Cup. Rabbit was then traded from the Saskatoon Blades for Kenton Dulle and a second-round pick in the 2008 WHL Bantam Draft.

Returning to the WHL, Rabbit helped the 2007 Memorial Cup hosts, the Vancouver Giants, to the WHL Finals against the Medicine Hat Tigers with 20 points in 22 games, but they were defeated in seven games. In the subsequent Memorial Cup, the Giants met the Tigers again in the final game and won the CHL title.

In 2007–08, Rabbit returned to Providence and recorded 26 points in 66 games. The following season, he improved to 34 points in 74 games. After the Bruins declined to extend his contract in the 2009 off-season, he was signed by the Nashville Predators AHL affiliate, the Milwaukee Admirals on October 2, 2009. In the 2009–10 season, Rabbit appeared in 76 games with the Admirals, posting a professional career-low of 18 points.

Without an NHL offer, Rabbit left North America and secured a try-out as a free agent with Croatian team KHL Medveščak of the Erste Bank Hockey League on August 30, 2010. After only a week on trial on September 7, 2010, Rabbit was signed by Medveščak to a one-year contract with an optional second year.

Wacey played with the Florida Panthers AHL affiliate, the San Antonio Rampage, during the 2011–12 season, helping them qualify for the Calder cup playoffs and beat the Chicago Wolves in the first round.

On June 21, 2012, Rabbit returned to Europe, signing a contract with Norwegian club, Lørenskog IK of the GET-ligaen. After three standout seasons in Norway, Rabbit left as a free agent to sign a one-year contract with Japanese club, Nippon Paper Cranes of the Asia League Ice Hockey (ALIH) on July 28, 2015.

After a further season in Italy with HC Pustertal Wölfe of the Alps Hockey League, Rabbit returned to play in North America for the first time in five years, in accepting an ECHL contract to play with new entrant the Jacksonville Icemen on August 31, 2017. Rabbit played in just 2 games to open the 2017–18 season with the Icemen before opting to return to Europe in agreeing to a one-year deal with Czech club, HC Dukla Jihlava on November 21, 2017.

At the conclusion of the season, Rabbit returned to North America as a free agent and later re-united with the Jacksonville Icemen, agreeing to a one-year deal on August 14, 2018.

After 15 professional seasons, Rabbit announced his retirement from professional hockey on August 26, 2021.

== Coaching career ==
After serving as an assistant coach of the Alberni Valley Bulldogs of the British Columbia Hockey League (BCHL), Rabbit joined the staff of the Saskatoon Blades as an assistant coach on June 27, 2022.

== Personal life ==
Rabbit, of First Nations descent, was born in Lethbridge, Alberta and raised in the nearby Kainai Nation in southern Alberta.

== Career statistics ==
=== Regular season and playoffs ===
			Regular season					Playoffs
Season	Team	League	GP	G	A	Pts	PIM	GP	G	A	Pts	PIM
2001–02	Calgary Northstars AAA	AMHL	35	24	28	52	26	—	—	—	—	—
2001–02	Saskatoon Blades	WHL	3	0	1	1	0	—	—	—	—	—
2002–03	Saskatoon Blades	WHL	62	21	24	45	33	5	1	3	4	6
2003–04	Saskatoon Blades	WHL	60	9	8	17	51	—	—	—	—	—
2004–05	Saskatoon Blades	WHL	70	22	45	67	70	4	1	2	3	0
2005–06	Saskatoon Blades	WHL	64	28	28	56	45	10	5	3	8	4
2006–07	Providence Bruins	AHL	22	1	2	3	25	—	—	—	—	—
2006–07	Vancouver Giants	WHL	30	11	25	36	34	22	11	9	20	16
2007–08	Providence Bruins	AHL	66	9	17	26	51	4	2	0	2	2
2008–09	Providence Bruins	AHL	74	16	18	34	74	14	1	5	6	8
2009–10	Milwaukee Admirals	AHL	76	8	10	18	53	5	0	0	0	0
2010–11	KHL Medveščak Zagreb	AUT	53	12	27	39	111	2	0	0	0	0
2010–11	KHL Medveščak Zagreb II	CRO	—	—	—	—	—	2	3	5	8	0
2011–12	Cincinnati Cyclones	ECHL	3	0	4	4	2	—	—	—	—	—
2011–12	San Antonio Rampage	AHL	71	2	12	14	51	10	0	0	0	2
2012–13	Lørenskog IK	NOR	44	19	34	53	48	12	5	6	11	6
2013–14	Lørenskog IK	NOR	38	16	29	45	30	2	0	0	0	4
2014–15	Lørenskog IK	NOR	36	11	22	33	47	5	0	2	2	29
2015–16	Nippon Paper Cranes	ALH	48	7	34	41	16	5	1	2	3	4
2016–17	HC Pustertal Wölfe	AlpsHL	35	19	15	34	38	2	0	1	1	2
2016–17	HC Pustertal Wölfe	ITA	1	1	0	1	0	—	—	—	—	—
2017–18	Jacksonville Icemen	ECHL	2	0	1	1	0	—	—	—	—	—
2017–18	HC Dukla Jihlava	ELH	17	2	3	5	10	—	—	—	—	—
2018–19	Jacksonville Icemen	ECHL	70	29	31	60	54	6	0	1	1	2
2019–20	CSM Corona Brașov	EL	19	10	12	22	33	—	—	—	—	—
2019–20	CSM Corona Brașov	ROU	6	4	2	6	39	—	—	—	—	—
2019–20	Jacksonville Icemen	ECHL	33	8	15	23	8	—	—	—	—	—
2020–21	Jacksonville Icemen	ECHL	46	7	21	28	35	—	—	—	—	—
AHL totals			309	36	59	95	254	33	3	5	8	12
ECHL totals			154	44	72	116	99	6	0	1	1	2
NOR totals			118	46	85	131	125	19	5	8	13	39

=== International ===
Year	Team	Event	GP	G	A	Pts	PIM
2003	Canada	U18	5	2	0	2	6
Junior totals			5	2	0	2	6

== Awards and honours ==
Award	Year
Junior
WHL Doug Wickenheiser Memorial Trophy	2005–06
CHL Memorial Cup	2006–07

Awards and achievements
Preceded by Colin Fraser	WHL Doug Wickenheiser Memorial Trophy; 2006	Succeeded by Kyle Moir
