= Cody Franson =

Canadian ice hockey player (born 1987)

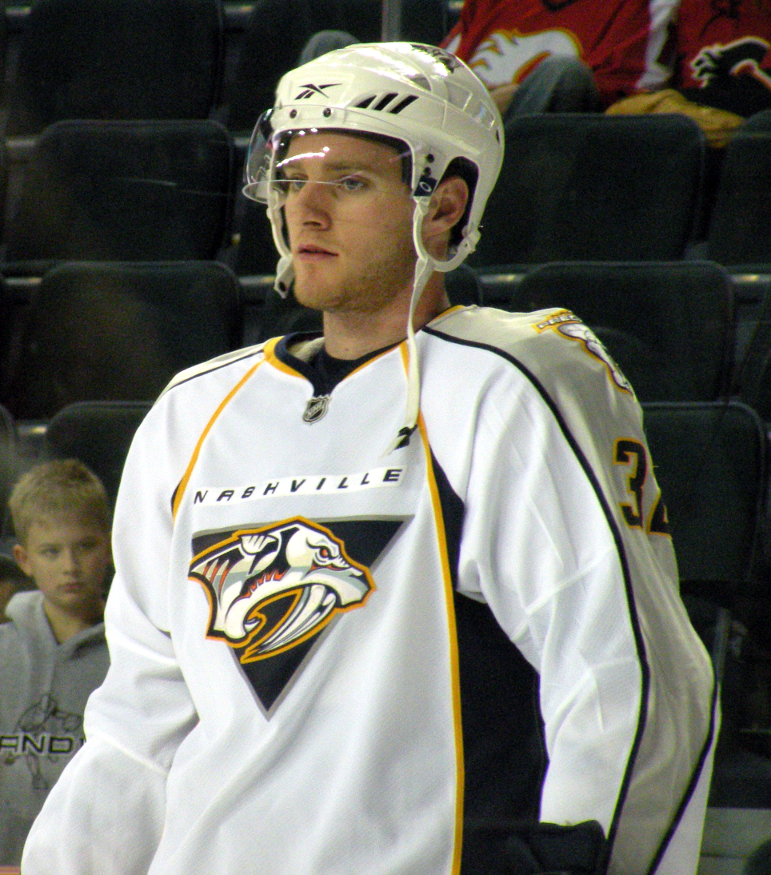
- Franson with the Nashville Predators in 2009
- Born: August 8, 1987 (age 39) Sicamous, British Columbia, Canada
- Height: 6 ft 5 in (196 cm)
- Weight: 213 lb (97 kg; 15 st 3 lb)
- Position: Defence
- Shot: Right
- Played for: Nashville Predators; Toronto Maple Leafs; Brynäs IF; Buffalo Sabres; Chicago Blackhawks; Avangard Omsk
- NHL draft: 79th overall, 2005; Nashville Predators
- Playing career: 2007–2022

Cody Franson (born August 8, 1987) is a Canadian former professional ice hockey defenceman. He most recently played for the Hershey Bears of the American Hockey League (AHL). Franson was drafted in the third round, 79th overall by the Nashville Predators in the 2005 NHL entry draft. Franson has also played for the Toronto Maple Leafs, Buffalo Sabres and Chicago Blackhawks.

== Playing career ==
=== Minor ===
Franson played minor hockey for the Sicamous Eagles in Sicamous, British Columbia. During the 2003–04 season, Franson played junior 'B' hockey with the Beaver Valley Nitehawks, a team based out of Fruitvale, British Columbia, in the Kootenay International Junior Hockey League (KIJHL). The Nitehawks won the KIJHL championship the year Franson played on the team.

=== Junior ===
Franson went undrafted in the 2002 WHL Bantam Draft. Nevertheless, the Vancouver Giants in the Western Hockey League (WHL) offered him a tryout and Franson was successful in making the team. He played full-time for the Giants starting in the 2004–05 season, where he put up 13 points. Franson then improved to 55- and 51-point campaigns with the Giants in the next two seasons, respectively. In 2006, he helped lead the Giants to the President's Cup as WHL champions, earning a berth in the 2006 Memorial Cup. He then recorded the only hat-trick of the tournament and led all defencemen in scoring, with five points in five games. In the subsequent off-season, Franson signed an entry-level contract with the Predators in July 2006, the organization that drafted him in the third round, 79th overall, in 2005. The next year, he was named to the WHL West First All-Star Team and was nominated for the Bill Hunter Memorial Trophy as the League's top defenceman, although the Trophy was ultimately awarded to Kris Russell of the Medicine Hat Tigers. After falling to Medicine Hat in the 2007 WHL Final, Franson and the Giants captured the 2007 Memorial Cup as tournament hosts, defeating the Tigers in the final.

=== Professional ===
==== Nashville Predators ====
In the 2007–08 season, Franson turned professional and was assigned to the Predators' American Hockey League (AHL) affiliate, the Milwaukee Admirals. He tallied 36 points in his rookie season in Milwaukee.

On October 17, 2009, Franson played in his first NHL game against the Washington Capitals, notching a single shot on goal. Later that week, on October 22, Franson scored his first career NHL goal against Pascal Leclaire of the Ottawa Senators.

==== Toronto Maple Leafs ====
On July 3, 2011, Franson, along with forward Matthew Lombardi, was traded to the Toronto Maple Leafs in exchange for Brett Lebda and Robert Slaney. During the subsequent 2011–12 season, Franson played 57 games for the Maple Leafs, scoring 21 points and finishing with a plus-minus rating of –1.

On October 1, 2012, Franson signed a contract with Brynäs IF of the Swedish Elitserien due to the 2012–13 NHL lockout. On January 13, 2013, he signed a one-year contract with Toronto as a restricted free agent. On May 13, Franson scored two goals for the Maple Leafs in Game 7 of the Eastern Conference Quarter-finals of the Stanley Cup playoffs against the Boston Bruins, a game Toronto eventually lost 5–4 in overtime.

On July 21, 2014, Franson and the Maple Leafs agreed to a one-year contract extension worth $3.3 million.

==== Return to Nashville ====
Franson suited up for 55 games for the Maple Leafs during the 2014–15 season, recording six goals and 32 points. On February 15, 2015, Franson was traded back to the Predators, along with Mike Santorelli, in exchange for Olli Jokinen, Brendan Leipsic and a first-round draft pick. This marked both Santorelli's and Franson's second tenure with Nashville. Franson skated in 23 games with the Predators to close out the season. He also appeared in five postseason games, recording two assists.

==== Buffalo Sabres ====
Despite being ranked as one of the top free agents available during the offseason, Franson did not sign a contract until September 10, 2015 when he signed a two-year deal with the Buffalo Sabres worth $6.6 million total. Over his two seasons with the Sabres, entrenched in a top four role, Franson appeared in 127 games for 36 points but was unable to help the rebuilding club make the post-season.

==== Chicago Blackhawks ====
On September 7, 2017, Franson agreed to attend the Chicago Blackhawks' training camp on a professional tryout agreement. On October 4, the Blackhawks signed Franson to a one-year, $1 million contract. Franson spent the majority of the season in the AHL with the Rockford IceHogs, registered 28 points (nine goals, 19 assists) and placed second among team defenseman with 15 power-play points (six goals, nine assists) in 37 games, earning him team Defenseman of the Year award honors.

In the 2018 Calder Cup Playoffs, Franson helped the IceHogs reach the Western Conference Finals for the first time in team history, collecting 13 points in 13 games and finished second among AHL defensemen in the postseason.

==== Avangard Omsk ====
On September 5, 2018, Franson signed his first overseas contract, joining Avangard Omsk of the KHL. Over the duration of his tenure with Avangard, Franson was productive from the blueline, registering 43 points in 98 regular season games.

==== Return to North America ====
As a free agent from his stint in Russia, and with the ongoing COVID-19 pandemic, Franson opted to return to North America, agreeing to a one-year AHL contract with his former club, the Rockford IceHogs, on September 23, 2020. As an alternate captain for the IceHogs in the 2020–21 season, Franson added an offensive presence from the blueline in posting 4 goals and 17 points in 26 games of the shortened season.

On July 22, 2021, Franson left the IceHogs as a free agent and continued playing in the AHL, agreeing to a one-year contract with the Hershey Bears, the primary affiliate of the Washington Capitals.

== International play ==
Medal record

Representing Canada

Ice hockey

World Junior Championships
Gold medal – first place	2007 Sweden	

Franson was a part of Canada men's national junior ice hockey team during the 2007 World Junior Championship. He helped the team win a gold medal in Sweden by recording two assists.

== Career statistics ==
=== Regular season and playoffs ===
			Regular season					Playoffs
Season	Team	League	GP	G	A	Pts	PIM	GP	G	A	Pts	PIM
2002–03	Sicamous Eagles	KIJHL	3	0	0	0	0	—	—	—	—	—
2002–03	Vancouver Giants	WHL	3	0	0	0	2	—	—	—	—	—
2003–04	Beaver Valley Nitehawks	KIJHL	48	9	22	31	60	—	—	—	—	—
2003–04	Trail Smoke Eaters	BCHL	2	0	1	1	0	—	—	—	—	—
2003–04	Vancouver Giants	WHL	2	0	0	0	0	—	—	—	—	—
2004–05	Vancouver Giants	WHL	64	2	11	13	44	4	0	1	1	0
2005–06	Vancouver Giants	WHL	71	15	40	55	61	18	5	15	20	12
2006–07	Vancouver Giants	WHL	59	17	34	51	88	19	3	4	7	10
2007–08	Milwaukee Admirals	AHL	76	11	25	36	40	6	0	2	2	2
2008–09	Milwaukee Admirals	AHL	76	11	41	52	47	11	3	5	8	8
2009–10	Milwaukee Admirals	AHL	6	2	5	7	4	—	—	—	—	—
2009–10	Nashville Predators	NHL	61	6	15	21	16	4	0	1	1	2
2010–11	Nashville Predators	NHL	80	8	21	29	30	12	1	5	6	0
2011–12	Toronto Maple Leafs	NHL	57	5	16	21	22	—	—	—	—	—
2012–13	Brynäs IF	SEL	26	3	4	7	10	—	—	—	—	—
2012–13	Toronto Maple Leafs	NHL	45	4	25	29	8	7	3	3	6	0
2013–14	Toronto Maple Leafs	NHL	79	5	28	33	30	—	—	—	—	—
2014–15	Toronto Maple Leafs	NHL	55	6	26	32	26	—	—	—	—	—
2014–15	Nashville Predators	NHL	23	1	3	4	2	5	0	2	2	0
2015–16	Buffalo Sabres	NHL	59	4	13	17	26	—	—	—	—	—
2016–17	Buffalo Sabres	NHL	68	3	16	19	34	—	—	—	—	—
2017–18	Chicago Blackhawks	NHL	23	1	6	7	8	—	—	—	—	—
2017–18	Rockford IceHogs	AHL	37	9	19	28	10	13	6	7	13	9
2018–19	Avangard Omsk	KHL	54	5	22	27	20	19	4	14	18	4
2019–20	Avangard Omsk	KHL	44	3	13	16	18	6	1	4	5	2
2020–21	Rockford IceHogs	AHL	26	4	13	17	12	—	—	—	—	—
2021–22	Hershey Bears	AHL	62	9	26	35	14	3	0	0	0	4
NHL totals			550	43	169	212	202	28	4	11	15	2
KHL totals			98	8	35	43	38	25	5	18	23	6

=== International ===
Year	Team	Event	Result	GP	G	A	Pts	PIM
2007	Canada	WJC	1st place, gold medalist(s)	6	0	2	2	2
Junior totals				6	0	2	2	2

== Awards ==
- Named to the WHL West Second All-Star Team in 2006.
- Won an Ed Chynoweth Cup (WHL champions) with the Vancouver Giants in 2006.
- Won a World Junior gold medal with Team Canada in 2007.
- Nominated for the Bill Hunter Memorial Trophy (Top WHL Defenceman) in 2007.
- Named to the WHL West First All-Star Team in 2007.
- Won a Memorial Cup with the Vancouver Giants in 2007.
