= J. D. Watt =

Canadian ice hockey player

- Born: May 25, 1987 (age 39) Cremona, Alberta, Canada
- Height: 6 ft 2 in (188 cm)
- Weight: 208 lb (94 kg; 14 st 12 lb)
- Position: Right wing
- Shot: Right
- ACAC team Former teams: SAIT Trojans; Quad City Flames; Las Vegas Wranglers; Utah Grizzlies; Abbotsford Heat; San Antonio Rampage
- NHL draft: 111th overall, 2005; Calgary Flames
- Playing career: 2005–2012

J. D. Watt (born May 25, 1987) is a Canadian former professional ice hockey winger. He was originally drafted by the Flames in the fourth round (111th overall) of the 2005 NHL entry draft. Beginning with the 2012–13 season, Watt has been playing with the SAIT Trojans of the Alberta Colleges Athletics Conference (ACAC). Watt was born and raised in Cremona, Alberta.

== Playing career ==
A native of Cremona, Alberta, Watt played Junior A hockey with the Drumheller Dragons of the Alberta Junior Hockey League (AJHL) in 2003–04 before joining the major junior ranks with the Vancouver Giants of the Western Hockey League (WHL) late in the season. Playing with the Giants, Watt won the 2006 President's Cup and the 2007 Memorial Cup championships. He played for the Red Deer Rebels and the Regina Pats in his final year of major junior.

Watt was drafted after his second junior season by his hometown team, the Calgary Flames (Cremona is approximately just 75 km outside of Calgary), in the fourth round, 111th overall, in the 2005 NHL entry draft. In 2008–09, he was initially assigned to the Flames' American Hockey League (AHL) affiliate, the Quad City Flames, but was quickly reassigned to the Las Vegas Wranglers of the ECHL. On November 9, 2008, he recorded his first professional hat trick and added an assist for a four-point night against the Phoenix RoadRunners in a 6–2 win. Watt was recalled, however, by the Quad City Flames on December 8, 2008. He was suspended by the AHL late in the season for four games on February 24, 2009, after delivering a check to the head in a game against the San Antonio Rampage.

On January 5, 2011, the Calgary Flames announced that J.D. Watt's contract has been terminated effective immediately. "J.D. notified us on Monday that he was no longer interested in pursuing his career with the Calgary Flames organization," "He informed us of his decision and as a result, he was then suspended and cleared unconditional waivers this morning. We are moving forward in the best interests of the hockey club, our players in Abbotsford and the Flames organization."

During the 2010–11 AHL season Watt played 27 games with the Abbotsford Heat, recording one goal and three assists for four points while accumulating 73 penalty minutes. On May 1, 2011, Watt left the Calgary Flames' organization.

As a professional, Watt was known for his abrasive style of play as an agitator. During his eight years of play in the Western Hockey League, American Hockey League, and ECHL, Watt was penalized for 117 fights. He joined the SAIT Trojans with the 2012–13 season, and through his first season of ACAC play, which included 28 regular season games and 8 playoff contests, Watt was not involved in a single fight.

== Awards ==
- Won the President's Cup as WHL champions with the Vancouver Giants in 2006.
- Won the Memorial Cup as CHL champions with the Vancouver Giants in 2007.

== Career statistics ==
			Regular season					Playoffs
Season	Team	League	GP	G	A	Pts	PIM	GP	G	A	Pts	PIM
2003–04	Drumheller Dragons	AJHL	59	20	17	39	249	—	—	—	—	—
2003–04	Vancouver Giants	WHL	3	1	0	1	0	10	0	3	3	14
2004–05	Vancouver Giants	WHL	66	6	7	13	213	6	0	1	1	12
2005–06	Vancouver Giants	WHL	58	8	29	37	199	18	4	3	7	42
2006–07	Vancouver Giants	WHL	70	34	19	53	182	21	2	3	5	72
2007–08	Red Deer Rebels	WHL	29	7	8	15	87	—	—	—	—	—
2007–08	Regina Pats	WHL	29	6	16	22	82	6	2	6	8	19
2008–09	Quad City Flames	AHL	42	0	2	2	146	—	—	—	—	—
2008–09	Las Vegas Wranglers	ECHL	18	5	9	14	51	16	3	4	7	70
2009–10	Utah Grizzlies	ECHL	1	0	0	0	5	—	—	—	—	—
2009–10	Abbotsford Heat	AHL	70	8	5	13	267	2	0	0	0	9
2010–11	Abbotsford Heat	AHL	27	1	3	4	73	—	—	—	—	—
2011–12	Ontario Reign	ECHL	30	4	10	14	78	5	1	0	1	0
2011–12	Manchester Monarchs	AHL	19	2	1	3	27	—	—	—	—	—
2012–13	SAIT	ACAC	28	13	27	40	36	8	2	3	5	26
2013–14	SAIT	ACAC	21	6	14	20	73	4	1	3	4	4
AHL totals			139	9	10	19	486	2	0	0	0	9
