= Matt Keetley =

Canadian ice hockey player (born 1986)

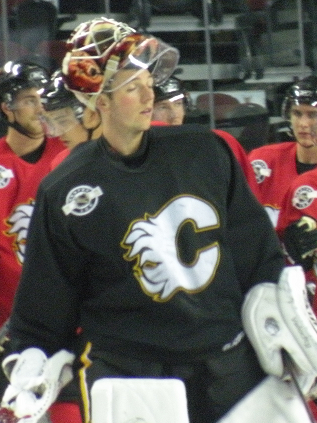
- Keetley in 2008 with the Calgary Flames
- Born: April 27, 1986 (age 40) Medicine Hat, Alberta, Canada
- Height: 6 ft 2 in (188 cm)
- Weight: 189 lb (86 kg; 13 st 7 lb)
- Position: Goaltender
- Caught: Right
- Played for: Calgary Flames
- NHL draft: 158th overall, 2005; Calgary Flames
- Playing career: 2007–2012

Matt Keetley (born April 27, 1986) is a Canadian former professional ice hockey goaltender who played in one game for Calgary Flames of the National Hockey League (NHL) during the 2007–08 season. The rest of his career, which lasted from 2007 to 2013, was spent in the minor leagues.

== Personal life ==
Born in Medicine Hat, Alberta, Keetley spent his early years living in Richmound, Saskatchewan where he grew up playing minor hockey with future Medicine Hat Tigers teammate Stefan Meyer. During his teenage years, Keetley's family moved back to Medicine Hat, the community that is still his off-season home.

== Playing career ==
Keetley began his major junior career in 2003–04 with the Medicine Hat Tigers of the Western Hockey League (WHL). He initially began the season in the Alberta Midget Hockey League but took over as the starting goalie for the Tigers during the 2004 WHL playoffs, subsequently leading the club to a President's Cup championship. In Keetley's draft year, he led the WHL with a 1.66 goals against average and a .933 save percentage. He was then drafted in the fifth round of the 2005 NHL entry draft, 158th overall by the Calgary Flames.

Keetley returned to the WHL for two more seasons, putting together his most accomplished major junior campaign in 2006–07. In the regular season, Keetley led the league with 42 wins and was named to the WHL East First All-Star Team. In the playoffs, Keetley won the airBC Trophy as playoff MVP, leading the Tigers to their second WHL championship in four years. Advancing to the 2007 Memorial Cup, Keetley won the Hap Emms Memorial Trophy as the tournament's outstanding goaltender and was named to the Memorial Cup All-Star Team as the Tigers fell to tournament hosts and WHL runners-up, the Vancouver Giants.

During the Memorial Cup tournament, on May 22, 2007, the Flames signed Keetley to an entry-level contract. In 2007–08, Keetley was assigned by the Flames to their American Hockey League (AHL) affiliate, the Quad City Flames. He was called up to play backup to Flames starter Miikka Kiprusoff on several occasions throughout the season. In a game against the Colorado Avalanche on November 5, 2007, Keetley made his NHL debut, replacing Kiprusoff with just under 10 minutes to go in the third period, making two saves. Keetley completed his rookie professional season with a 10–8 record with Quad City to go with a 2.33 goals against average and a .933 save percentage.

To begin the 2008–09 season, Keetley was named AHL Player of the Week on October 27, 2008. On February 10, 2009, Keetley was reassigned to Calgary's ECHL affiliate in Las Vegas for seven games before returning to Quad City's roster. One year later, the Abbotsford Heat assigned Keetley to the Victoria Salmon Kings for conditioning purposes from November 10–17, 2009. During his brief three game stint with Victoria, Keetley recorded two wins and two shutouts and was named the ECHL's Goaltender of the Week on November 17, 2009, before he returned to the Heat's lineup.

== Awards ==
=== Major Junior ===
- Won the President's Cup/Ed Chynoweth Cup as WHL champions with the Medicine Hat Tigers in 2004 and 2007.
- Named to the WHL East Second All-Star Team in 2006.
- Named to the WHL East First All-Star Team in 2007.
- Awarded the airBC Trophy as WHL playoff MVP in 2007.
- Named to the Memorial Cup Tournament All-Star Team in 2007.
- Awarded the Hap Emms Memorial Trophy as Memorial Cup top goaltender in 2007.

=== Professional ===
- Named AHL Player of the Week on October 27, 2008.
- Named Reebok Hockey ECHL Goaltender of the Week on November 17, 2009.
- Named Ronald Allen Clothiers-Abbotsford Heat Player of the Month for December.

== Career statistics ==
=== Regular season and playoffs ===
			Regular season										Playoffs
Season	Team	League	GP	W	L	T	OTL	MIN	GA	SO	GAA	SV%	GP	W	L	MIN	GA	SO	GAA	SV%
2003–04	Medicine Hat Tigers	WHL	3	0	1	0	0	71	5	0	4.17	.881	20	16	4	1182	38	4	1.92	.917
2004–05	Medicine Hat Tigers	WHL	32	21	5	3	0	1846	51	6	1.66	.933	3	1	0	103	8	0	4.66	.805
2005–06	Medicine Hat Tigers	WHL	62	42	13	—	6	3741	130	6	2.09	.916	13	9	2	864	30	0	2.08	.921
2006–07	Medicine Hat Tigers	WHL	55	42	11	—	1	3258	119	6	2.19	.913	23	16	7	1407	51	4	2.18	.920
2006–07	Medicine Hat Tigers	M-Cup	—	—	—	—	—	—	—	—	—	—	4	2	2	238	6	1	1.51	.949
2007–08	Calgary Flames	NHL	1	0	0	—	0	9	0	0	0.00	1.000	—	—	—	—	—	—	—	—
2007–08	Quad City Flames	AHL	26	10	8	—	3	1393	54	1	2.33	.912	—	—	—	—	—	—	—	—
2008–09	Quad City Flames	AHL	33	8	18	—	4	1853	88	2	2.85	.892	—	—	—	—	—	—	—	—
2008–09	Las Vegas Wranglers	ECHL	7	1	3	—	3	429	19	0	2.66	.930	—	—	—	—	—	—	—	—
2009–10	Abbotsford Heat	AHL	23	10	7	—	2	1205	52	2	2.59	.912	—	—	—	—	—	—	—	—
2009–10	Victoria Salmon Kings	ECHL	9	2	7	—	0	484	31	2	3.84	.880	5	2	3	298	13	0	2.62	.904
2010–11	Abbotsford Heat	AHL	9	0	7	—	1	424	25	0	3.54	.860	—	—	—	—	—	—	—	—
2011–12	Houston Aeros	AHL	2	1	1	—	0	84	6	0	4.31	.800	—	—	—	—	—	—	—	—
2011–12	Bakersfield Condors	ECHL	38	12	20	—	3	2057	102	2	2.98	.910	—	—	—	—	—	—	—	—
AHL totals			93	29	41	—	10	4959	225	5	2.72	0.899	—	—	—	—	—	—	—	—
ECHL totals			54	15	30	—	6	2970	152	4	3.07	.908	5	2	3	298	13	0	2.62	.904
NHL totals			1	0	0	—	0	9	0	0	0.00	1.000	—	—	—	—	—	—	—	—

== See also ==
- List of players who played only one game in the NHL
