= Lance Bouma =

Canadian ice hockey player (born 1990)

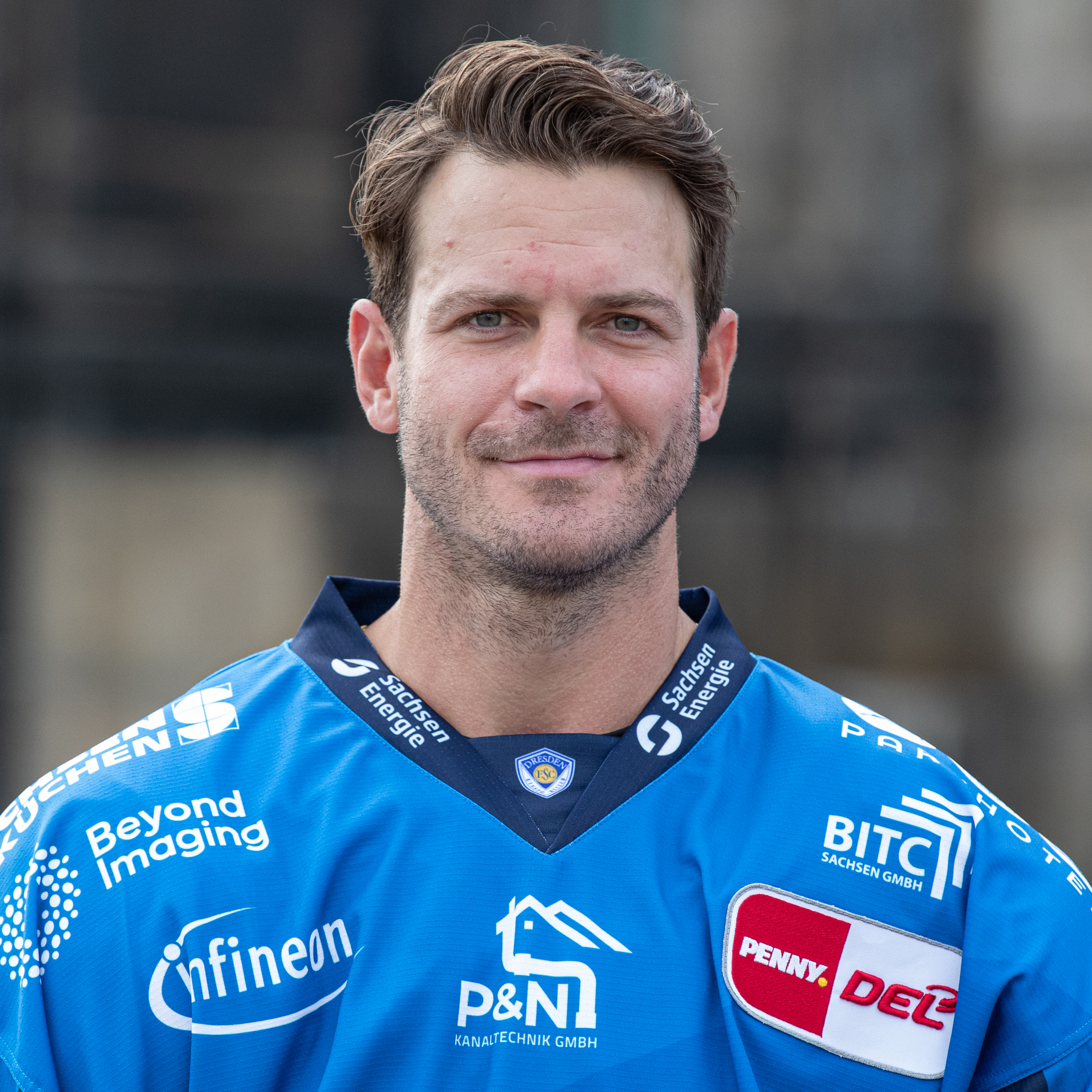
- Born: March 25, 1990 (age 36) Provost, Alberta, Canada
- Height: 6 ft 1 in (185 cm)
- Weight: 210 lb (95 kg; 15 st 0 lb)
- Position: Centre
- Shoots: Left
- DEL team Former teams: Dresdner Eislöwen; Calgary Flames; Chicago Blackhawks; Genève-Servette HC; IK Oskarshamn; Malmö Redhawks; Linköping HC
- NHL draft: 78th overall, 2008; Calgary Flames
- Playing career: 2010–present

Lance Gordon Bouma (born March 25, 1990) is a Canadian professional ice hockey centre who is currently playing with Dresdner Eislöwen of the Deutsche Eishockey Liga (DEL). He previously played in the National Hockey League (NHL) with the Calgary Flames and Chicago Blackhawks.

Bouma was a third round selection of the Flames, 78th overall, in the 2008 NHL entry draft and made his NHL debut in January 2011. As a junior, he was a member of the Vancouver Giants team that won the 2007 Memorial Cup.

== Playing career ==
=== Amateur ===
Bouma was a second round selection of the Vancouver Giants at the 2005 Western Hockey League (WHL) Bantam Draft. He spent the majority of the 2005–06 season playing midget hockey in the Rural Alberta Midget Hockey League, but appeared in five games as a 15-year-old for the Giants, scoring one goal and four points. He became a regular for the Giants in the 2006–07 WHL season, appearing in 49 regular season games and 22 playoff games as the Giants reached the WHL final. Though the team lost to the Medicine Hat Tigers for the league championship, they qualified for the 2007 Memorial Cup as the host team, and defeated the Tigers in the final for the Canadian Hockey League championship. Bouma finished second on his team in rookie playoff scoring behind James Wright. Additionally, he played for Team Alberta at the 2007 Canada Games hockey tournament, scoring two goals as the team finished in fourth place.

After improving to 12 goals and 35 points in 71 games for the Giants in 2007–08, Bouma was selected by the Calgary Flames in the third round, 78th overall, of the 2008 NHL entry draft. He remained in junior for two more seasons, and served as the Giants' captain in 2009–10, in which the team reached the third round of the WHL playoffs before bowing out to the Tri-City Americans.

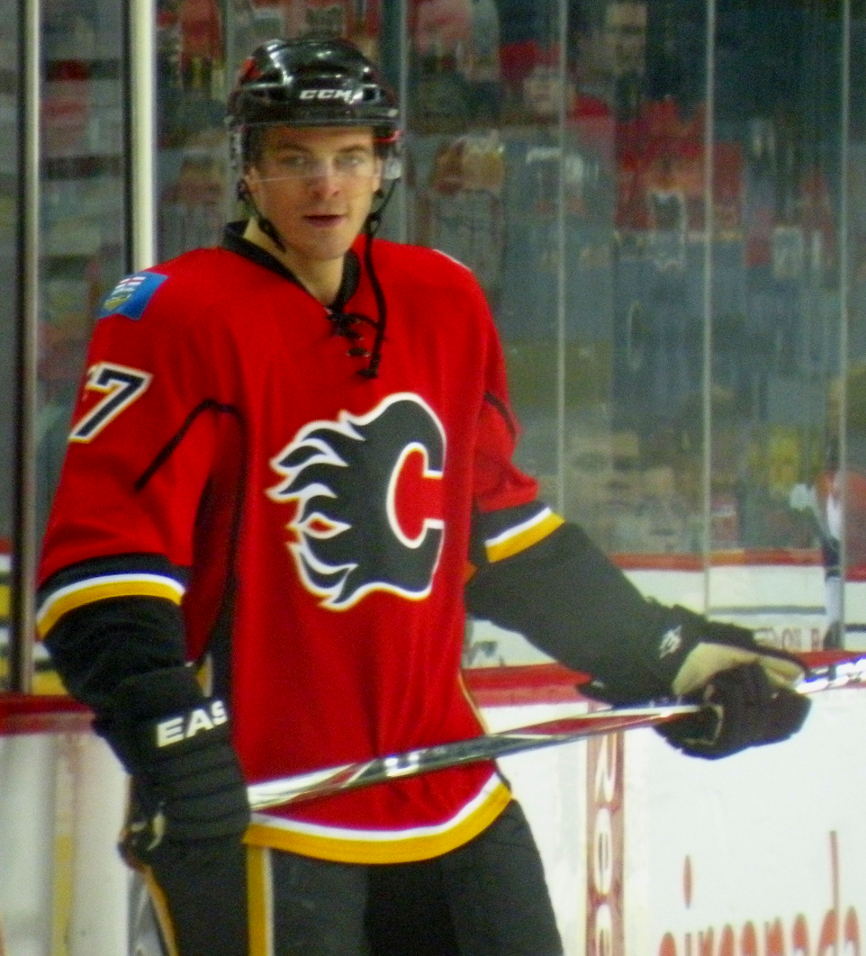
Bouma during his tenure with the Flames.

=== Professional ===
Upon his team's elimination from the 2010 WHL Playoffs, Bouma played his first professional games, joining the Flames' American Hockey League (AHL) affiliate, the Abbotsford Heat, for five playoff games. He scored one goal, against the Hamilton Bulldogs in the second round of the AHL playoffs. Bouma joined the Heat full-time for the 2010–11 AHL season, and with 11 goals through his first 49 games, was approaching his best career best goal total at any level.

On February 3, 2011, Bouma received his first NHL recall by the Flames. He made his NHL debut two nights later against the Los Angeles Kings, and scored his first point, assisting on a Mikael Backlund goal, on February 7 against the Chicago Blackhawks. It was the only point he scored in 16 NHL games with the Flames.

Bouma split the 2011–12 season between the Heat and the Flames. In Abbotsford, he recorded three goals, three assists, and 53 penalty minutes in 31 games. In Calgary, he appeared in 27 games and scored three points. Bouma scored his first NHL goal on January 7, 2012, against Niklas Bäckström of the Minnesota Wild in a 3-1 victory. Bouma was expected to make the Flames roster for the start of the 2012–13 NHL season, however a labour dispute resulted in his being assigned to Abbotsford instead. He played only three games for the Heat before suffering a serious knee injury. He missed the remainder of the season and required two surgeries to repair his medial collateral and anterior cruciate ligaments.

Returning healthy for the 2013–14 season, Bouma established himself as a regular in the Flames lineup with his physical, two-way play and was praised by coach Bob Hartley as being the team's "most improved player". On August 27, 2014, the Flames re-signed Bouma, who was a restricted free agent, to a one-year contract worth $577,500.

Following the 2014–15 season, Bouma became a restricted free agent under the NHL Collective Bargaining Agreement. The Flames made him a qualifying offer to retain his NHL rights, and on July 5, 2015, Bouma filed for salary arbitration.

With two successive disappointing seasons driven by injury and a lack of production on June 30, 2017, the Flames announced Bouma was placed on unconditional waivers to buy out the remaining year of his contract. On July 1, 2017, Bouma signed a one-year contract with the Chicago Blackhawks. He split the 2017-18 season between the Blackhawks and the Rockford IceHogs.

On August 15, 2018, Bouma left North America after seven NHL seasons, signing a two-year contract with Genève-Servette HC of the National League (NL). He recorded two assists in three games before being sidelined for the remainder of the season with a knee injury.

On September 2, 2019, Bouma agreed to attend the Los Angeles Kings' training camp on a professional tryout (PTO). After competing in camp, Bouma was re-assigned on a PTO with the Kings' AHL affiliate, the Ontario Reign, to begin the 2019–20 season. In a veteran role, Bouma contributed 10 goals and 20 points with the Reign before the season was cancelled due to the COVID-19 pandemic.

As a free agent, Bouma returned to Europe, agreeing to a one-year contract mid-season with top-tier Swedish club IK Oskarshamn of the SHL on December 23, 2020. Following completion of his contract with IK Oskarshamn, Bouma opted to continue in the SHL, joining fellow Swedish club Malmö Redhawks on a two-year contract on June 15, 2021.

Following five seasons in the SHL, Bouma left Sweden as a free agent and signed a one-year deal with newly promoted German club, of the DEL, on June 6, 2025.

== Career statistics ==
			Regular season					Playoffs
Season	Team	League	GP	G	A	Pts	PIM	GP	G	A	Pts	PIM
2005–06	Vancouver Giants	WHL	5	1	3	4	0	—	—	—	—	—
2006–07	Vancouver Giants	WHL	49	3	5	8	31	22	3	3	6	12
2007–08	Vancouver Giants	WHL	71	12	23	35	93	10	0	1	1	8
2008–09	Vancouver Giants	WHL	48	9	16	25	116	17	7	5	12	30
2009–10	Vancouver Giants	WHL	57	14	29	43	134	16	4	13	17	47
2009–10	Abbotsford Heat	AHL	—	—	—	—	—	5	1	0	1	2
2010–11	Abbotsford Heat	AHL	61	12	8	20	53	—	—	—	—	—
2010–11	Calgary Flames	NHL	16	0	1	1	2	—	—	—	—	—
2011–12	Abbotsford Heat	AHL	31	3	3	6	53	—	—	—	—	—
2011–12	Calgary Flames	NHL	26	1	2	3	11	—	—	—	—	—
2012–13	Abbotsford Heat	AHL	3	1	0	1	2	—	—	—	—	—
2013–14	Calgary Flames	NHL	78	5	10	15	41	—	—	—	—	—
2014–15	Calgary Flames	NHL	78	16	18	34	54	2	0	0	0	2
2015–16	Calgary Flames	NHL	44	2	5	7	31	—	—	—	—	—
2016–17	Calgary Flames	NHL	61	3	4	7	35	3	0	0	0	2
2017–18	Chicago Blackhawks	NHL	53	3	6	9	36	—	—	—	—	—
2017–18	Rockford IceHogs	AHL	20	7	7	14	10	13	1	1	2	12
2018–19	Genève–Servette HC	NL	3	0	2	2	2	—	—	—	—	—
2019–20	Ontario Reign	AHL	57	10	10	20	63	—	—	—	—	—
2020–21	IK Oskarshamn	SHL	21	6	7	13	47	—	—	—	—	—
2021–22	Malmö Redhawks	SHL	51	9	15	24	45	—	—	—	—	—
2022–23	Malmö Redhawks	SHL	47	7	7	14	26	—	—	—	—	—
2023–24	Linköping HC	SHL	41	2	6	8	35	4	0	0	0	2
2024–25	Linköping HC	SHL	47	5	7	12	8	—	—	—	—	—
NHL totals			357	30	46	76	210	5	0	0	0	4
SHL totals			207	29	42	71	161	4	0	0	0	2
