= Mário Bližňák =

Slovak ice hockey player (born 1987)

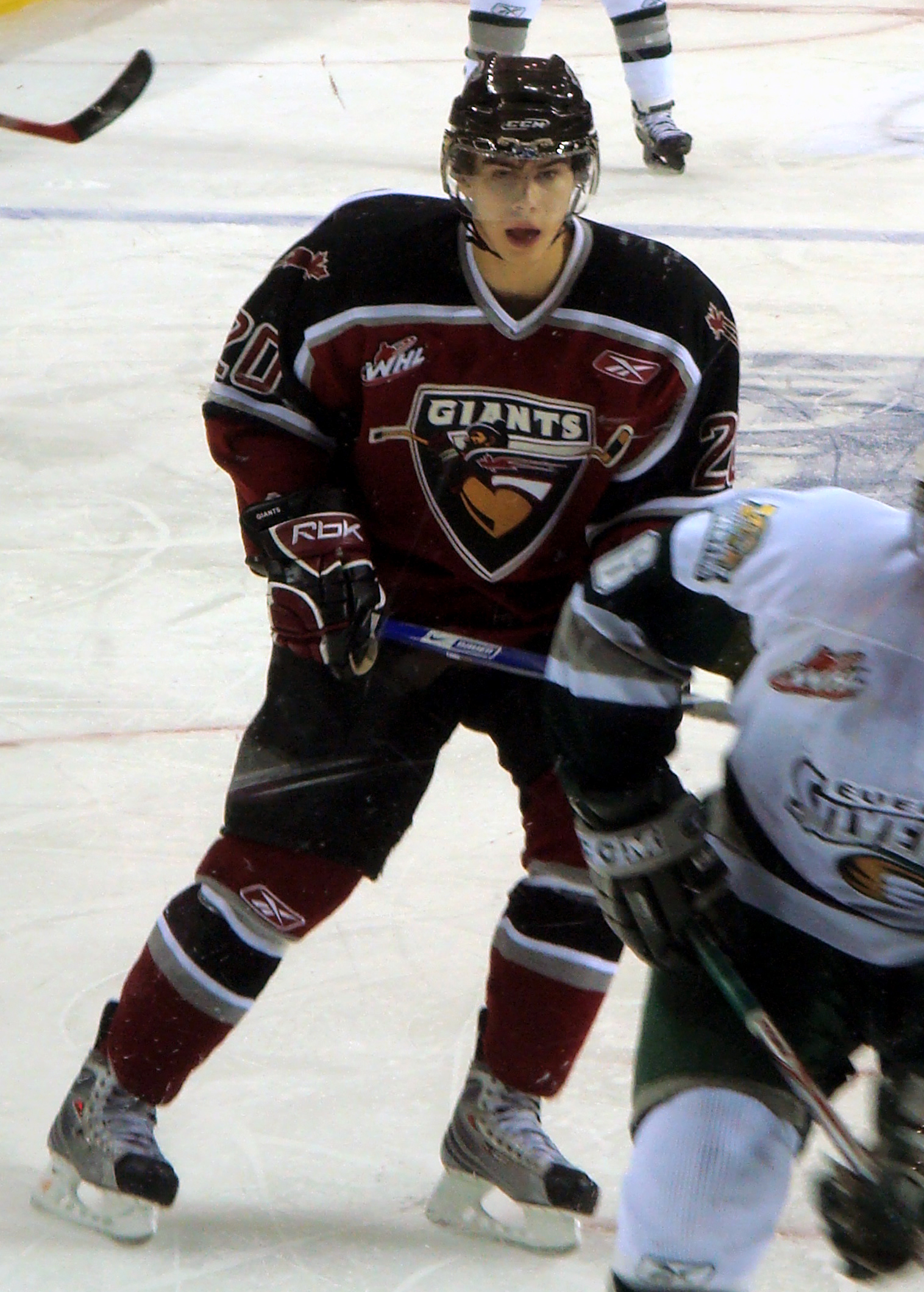
- Bližňák with the Vancouver Giants in 2007
- Born: 6 March 1987 (age 39) Trenčín, Czechoslovakia
- Height: 6 ft 0 in (183 cm)
- Weight: 196 lb (89 kg; 14 st 0 lb)
- Position: Centre
- Shot: Left
- Played for: Vancouver Canucks; HK Dubnica; HC Sparta Praha; HC Slovan Bratislava; HC Plzeň; HC Bílí Tygři Liberec; HK Dukla Trenčín
- National team: Slovakia
- NHL draft: 205th overall, 2005; Vancouver Canucks
- Playing career: 2008–2019
Medal record
World Championships
Silver medal – second place	2012 Finland

Mário Bližňák (born 6 March 1987) is a Slovak former professional ice hockey center. He previously played for the Vancouver Canucks of the National Hockey League (NHL). After playing in the Slovak Extraliga, Bližňák was selected by the Canucks in the 2005 NHL entry draft, and moved to North America, joining the Vancouver Giants of the major junior Western Hockey League (WHL) in 2005. Bližňák played three seasons with the Giants, helping them win the Memorial Cup, the national championship for major junior hockey in Canada, in 2007, before joining the Moose in 2008. He is best known as a defensive forward.

== Playing career ==
Bližňák began playing junior hockey in his native Slovakia with Dubnica Spartak HC's under-18 and junior teams. After appearing in 19 games with Dubnica's senior team of the Slovak Extraliga as a seventeen-year-old in 2004–05, he was drafted by the Vancouver Canucks in the seventh round, 205th overall, in the 2005 NHL entry draft. Bližňák was also drafted that off-season 27th overall by the Vancouver Giants of the Western Hockey League in the 2005 CHL Import Draft. He subsequently moved to North America to continue to play junior for the Giants.

In three seasons with the Giants, Bližňák helped the club to a WHL championship as part of a 21-point rookie campaign in 2005–06 and a Memorial Cup championship in 2007. Following his Memorial Cup victory with the Giants, he signed his first NHL contract with the Canucks. Bližňák returned to the Giants the following season and posted a WHL career-high 51 points in 67 games.

Graduating from junior, he was assigned by the Canucks to their AHL affiliate, the Manitoba Moose, for the 2008–09 season. Playing alongside linemate and veteran team captain Mike Keane most of the season, he recorded 7 goals and 16 points in 64 games, second among team rookies. Bližňák and the Moose made it to the Calder Cup finals that season but lost to the Hershey Bears in six games. Bližňák scored the lone goal for the Moose in the decisive game six. Bližňák earned his first NHL call-up with the Canucks the following season in 2009–10 on 30 October 2009, after an injury to fellow Moose call-up Alexandre Bolduc. He played two games with the Canucks before being sent back to rejoin the Moose, where he recorded 13 goals and 28 points over 76 games. His +7 rating ranked first on the Moose. He also added three points in six post-season games as the Moose were eliminated in the first round by the Hamilton Bulldogs.

After becoming a restricted free agent in the off-season, he re-signed with the Canucks to a one-year contract on 4 August 2010. He started the 2010–11 season with the Moose, appearing in thirteen games and scoring four points, before the Canucks recalled him on 10 November 2010. One day after the call up to the Canucks, Bližňák scored his first NHL career goal against Ottawa Senators goaltender Pascal Leclaire on a one-timer pass from winger Tanner Glass. The Canucks won the game 6–2. He played in four games with the Canucks before being returned to the AHL, where he finished the regular season with 11 goals and 27 points over 74 games. During the 2011 playoffs, he added a goal and an assist over 14 games, helping the Moose to the second round, where they were eliminated by the Hamilton Bulldogs. The Canucks chose not to renew his contract in the off-season as he was not given a qualifying offer.

== International play ==
Bližňák played for Slovakia in the 2007 World Junior Championships. He tallied 1 goal in 6 games as Slovakia failed to advance from the preliminaries.

== Career statistics ==
=== Regular season and playoffs ===
			Regular season					Playoffs
Season	Team	League	GP	G	A	Pts	PIM	GP	G	A	Pts	PIM
2003–04	Spartak Dubnica nad Váhom	SVK U18	45	25	26	51	62	—	—	—	—	—
2003–04	Spartak Dubnica nad Váhom	SVK U20	2	1	0	1	2	—	—	—	—	—
2004–05	Spartak Dubnica nad Váhom	SVK U18	14	5	8	13	45	—	—	—	—	—
2004–05	Spartak Dubnica nad Váhom	SVK U20	36	22	17	39	38	—	—	—	—	—
2004–05	Spartak Dubnica nad Váhom	SVK	19	0	0	0	14	—	—	—	—	—
2005–06	Vancouver Giants	WHL	69	9	12	21	29	18	4	1	5	14
2006–07	Vancouver Giants	WHL	47	8	14	22	20	22	6	6	12	14
2007–08	Vancouver Giants	WHL	67	19	32	51	36	10	3	5	8	2
2008–09	Manitoba Moose	AHL	64	7	9	16	24	21	3	2	5	8
2009–10	Vancouver Canucks	NHL	2	0	0	0	0	—	—	—	—	—
2009–10	Manitoba Moose	AHL	76	13	15	28	40	6	2	1	3	2
2010–11	Manitoba Moose	AHL	74	11	16	27	22	14	1	1	2	8
2010–11	Vancouver Canucks	NHL	4	1	0	1	0	—	—	—	—	—
2011–12	HC Sparta Praha	ELH	52	11	18	29	36	5	3	2	5	4
2012–13	HC Slovan Bratislava	KHL	51	9	11	20	20	4	2	0	2	0
2013–14	HC Slovan Bratislava	KHL	45	5	4	9	28	—	—	—	—	—
2014–15	HC Slovan Bratislava	KHL	28	0	2	2	6	—	—	—	—	—
2014–15	HC Škoda Plzeň	ELH	22	6	4	10	10	4	1	1	2	2
2015–16	HC Škoda Plzeň	ELH	50	12	9	21	20	6	1	0	1	4
2016–17	Bílí Tygři Liberec	ELH	38	6	6	12	22	16	0	5	5	10
2017–18	Bílí Tygři Liberec	ELH	24	2	2	4	8	—	—	—	—	—
2017–18	HC Benátky nad Jizerou	CZE.2	1	0	0	0	0	—	—	—	—	—
2018–19	HK Dukla Trenčín	SVK	23	4	6	10	6	—	—	—	—	—
NHL totals			6	1	0	1	0	—	—	—	—	—
ELH totals			186	37	39	76	96	31	5	8	13	20
KHL totals			124	14	17	31	54	4	2	0	2	0

=== International statistics ===
Year	Team	Event	GP	G	A	Pts	PIM
2005	Slovakia	WJC18	6	1	0	1	0
2007	Slovakia	WJC	6	1	0	1	4
2012	Slovakia	WC	10	0	3	3	2
2013	Slovakia	WC	8	1	1	2	6
2015	Slovakia	WC	7	0	0	0	2
2017	Slovakia	WC	7	1	1	2	0
Junior totals			12	2	0	2	4
Senior totals			32	2	5	7	10
