= 2007 Memorial Cup =

Canadian junior men's ice hockey championship

2007 Mastercard Memorial Cup

Tournament details
- Venue(s): Pacific Coliseum; Vancouver, British Columbia
- Dates: May 18–27, 2007
- Teams: 4
- Host team: Vancouver Giants (WHL)
- TV partner: Rogers Sportsnet

Final positions
- Champions: Vancouver Giants (WHL) (1st title)

Tournament statistics
- Games played: 9
- Attendance: 121,561 (13,507 per game)

The Memorial Cup trophy

The 2007 MasterCard Memorial Cup was played in May 2007 in Vancouver, British Columbia, at the Pacific Coliseum. It was the 89th annual Memorial Cup competition and determined the major junior ice hockey champion of the Canadian Hockey League (CHL). The tournament was competed between the WHL champion, the Medicine Hat Tigers; the OHL champion, the Plymouth Whalers; the QMJHL champion, the Lewiston Maineiacs; and the host team and tournament champion, Vancouver Giants, who were competing in their second consecutive national junior championship. The Memorial Cup tournament was a four team tournament with a round-robin format. The Giants won their first Memorial Cup, defeating Medicine Hat 3–1 in the second all-WHL final in tournament history (the first was in 1989). The tournament set a new Memorial Cup attendance record with 121,561 fans attending the nine games. The previous record of 84,686 was set at the 2003 tournament in Quebec City.

The tournament was the first to feature two league champions based in the United States, from Lewiston, Maine and Plymouth, Michigan, respectively. The only previous Memorial Cup to feature two American teams was the 1998 Memorial Cup, featuring the WHL champion, the Portland Winter Hawks and the host, the Spokane Chiefs. The 2007 MasterCard Memorial Cup was also the first to feature the two-referee system.

The Memorial Cup trophy's ties to Canadian military were evident when Canadian Forces units delivered it to the championship by sea, aboard HMCS Vancouver; by air, hoisted aboard a CH-149 Cormorant helicopter; and by land, via the armoured 39th Canadian Brigade Group Convoy.

== Round-robin standings ==
Pos	Team	Pld	W	L	GF	GA	GD
1	Medicine Hat Tigers (WHL)	3	2	1	6	4	+2
1	Vancouver Giants (host)	3	2	1	6	5	+1
3	Plymouth Whalers (OHL) (Note: Because Lewiston and Plymouth had the same number of wins, they had to play a tiebreaker game .)	3	1	2	6	9	−3
3	Lewiston Maineiacs (QMJHL)	3	1	2	5	5	0

== Rosters ==
Vancouver Giants (host)	Plymouth Whalers (OHL)
Goaltenders: 29 – Tyson Sexsmith; 30 – Blaine Neufeld; Defencemen: 4 – Brendan Mikkelson; 5 – Neil Manning; 6 – Cody Franson; 7 – Jonathon Blum; 21 – Brett Festerling; 23 – A. J. Thelen; 25 – Nolan Toigo; 28 – Brent Regner; Forwards: 9 – Evander Kane; 10 – Lance Bouma; 11 – J. D. Watt; 12 – Tim Kraus; 14 – Craig Cunningham; 15 – Spencer Machacek; 16 – Wacey Rabbit; 18 – Mitch Czibere; 19 – James Wright; 20 – Mario Bliznak; 22 – Kenndal McArdle; 24 – Garet Hunt; 26 – Michal Repik; 27 – Milan Lucic; 38 – Mike Wuchterl; Head coach: Don Hay	Goaltenders: 30 – Jeremy Smith; 40 – Michal Neuvirth; Defencemen: 2 – Brett Bellemore; 3 – Wes Cunningham; 4 – Leo Jenner; 5 – Jozef Sladok; 6 – Steven Whitely; 10 – Ryan McGinnis; 26 – Steve Ward; 28 – Zack Shepley; 34 – Jordan O'Neill; Forwards: 7 – Jared Boll; 9 – Vern Cooper; 11 – Evan Brophey; 12 – Kaine Geldart; 13 – Sean O'Connor; 15 – Andrew Fournier; 16 – Brett Valiquette; 17 – Dan Collins; 19 – James Neal; 20 – Chris Terry; 21 – Tommy Sestito; 22 – AJ Jenks; 23 – Joe McCann; 25 – Joe Gaynor; 27 – Daniel Ryder; Head coach: Mike Vellucci
Lewiston Maineiacs (QMJHL)	Medicine Hat Tigers (WHL)
Goaltenders: 1 – Jonathan Bernier; 30 – Peter Delmas; Defencemen: 2 – Michael Ward; 3 – Chad Denny; 4 – Tom Michalik; 15 – Marc-Andre Crete; 46 – Kevin Marshall; 48 – Patrick Cusack; 79 – Michal Korenko; Forwards: 5 – Alexander Beaton; 9 – Simon Courcelles; 10 – Marc-Andre Cliche; 11 – Stefano Giliati; 19 – Marc-Andre Daneau; 20 – Jakub Bundil; 21 – David Taylor; 22 – Chris Tutalo; 27 – Eric Castonguay; 34 – Stefan Chaput; 39 – David Perron; 47 – Danick Paquette; 55 – Sebastien Piche; 72 – Pierre-Luc Faubert; 89 – Triston Manson; Head coach: Clement Jodoin	Goaltenders: 31 – Ryan Holfeld; 33 – Matt Keetley; Defencemen: 3 – Gord Baldwin; 4 – David Schlemko; 5 – Trevor Glass; 10 – Kris Russell; 18 – Michael Sauer; 24 – Mark Isherwood; 27 – Shayne Brown; 29 – Jordan Bendfeld; Forwards: 9 – Brennan Bosch; 11 – Scott Wasden; 12 – Colton Grant; 14 – Darren Helm; 15 – Derek Dorsett; 16 – Daine Todd; 17 – Tyler Swystun; 19 – Matt Lowry; 20 – Kevin Undershute; 21 – Jerrid Sauer; 22 – Tyler Ennis; 23 – Jordan Hickmott; 25 – Jakub Rumpel; 28 – Bretton Cameron; 36 – Chris Stevens; Head coach: Willie Desjardins

== Schedule ==
=== Round robin ===
May 18, 2007	Plymouth	3–4 OT	Vancouver	Pacific Coliseum attendance: 13,428

J. Neal 7:26 (PP), 2nd period J. Neal 10:25 (PP), 2nd period R. McGinnis 16:36 (PP), 2nd period / Goals / S. Machacek 5:41 (PP), 1st period M. Lucic 8:17, 2nd period M. Lucic 13:14, 2nd period K. McArdle 5:06, OT1

May 19, 2007	Medicine Hat	1–3	Lewiston	Pacific Coliseum attendance: 12,720

D. Helm 11:40 (PP), 1st period / Goals / E. Castonguay 1:40 (PP), 2nd period S. Piche 12:04, 2nd period S. Chaput 2:17, 3rd period

May 20, 2007	Vancouver	2–1	Lewiston	Pacific Coliseum attendance: 13,734

K. McArdle 8:52 (PP), 3rd period W. Rabbit 15:47, 3rd period / Goals / D. Perron 5:48, 1st period

May 21, 2007	Medicine Hat	4–1	Plymouth	Pacific Coliseum attendance: 12,601

B. Bosch 1:57, 1st period T. Ennis 4:25, 1st period T. Ennis 1:43 (PP), 2nd period D. Todd 0:38 (PP), 3rd period / Goals / J. Neal 1:32, 3rd period

May 22, 2007	Lewiston	1–2 OT	Plymouth	Pacific Coliseum attendance: 12,415

S. Courcelles 14:07, 3rd period / Goals / E. Brophey 18:48 (SH), 3rd period A. Fournier 4:19, OT1

May 23, 2007	Vancouver	0–1	Medicine Hat	Pacific Coliseum attendance: 14,901

Goals / D. Dorsett 17:26 (PP), 2nd Period

=== Tie breaker ===
May 24, 2007	Lewiston	1–5	Plymouth	Pacific Coliseum attendance: 12,008

S. Courcelles 0:51, 3rd period / Goals / T. Sestito 5:39, 1st period J. Neal 8:44, 1st period E. Brophey 14:30 (PP), 2nd period T. Sestito 3:20, 3rd period J. Neal 18:31 (EN), 3rd period

=== Semi-final ===
May 25, 2007	Plymouth	1–8	Vancouver	Pacific Coliseum attendance: 13,372

A. Fournier 8:40, 2nd period / Goals / W. Rabbit 0:55, 1st period M. Repik 12:59, 1st period C. Franson 4:55, 2nd period M. Repik 14:16 (SH), 2nd period J. Watt 16:49, 2nd period J. Wright 4:38, 3rd period J. Wright 5:16, 3rd period S. Machacek 15:12 (PP), 3rd period

=== Championship game ===
May 27, 2007	Vancouver	3–1	Medicine Hat	Pacific Coliseum attendance: 16,281

M. Bliznak 6:07, 2nd period M. Repik 15:05, 3rd period S. Machacek 19:17 (PP / EN), 3rd period / Goals / D. Helm 15:49 (PP), 2nd period

== Leading scorers ==
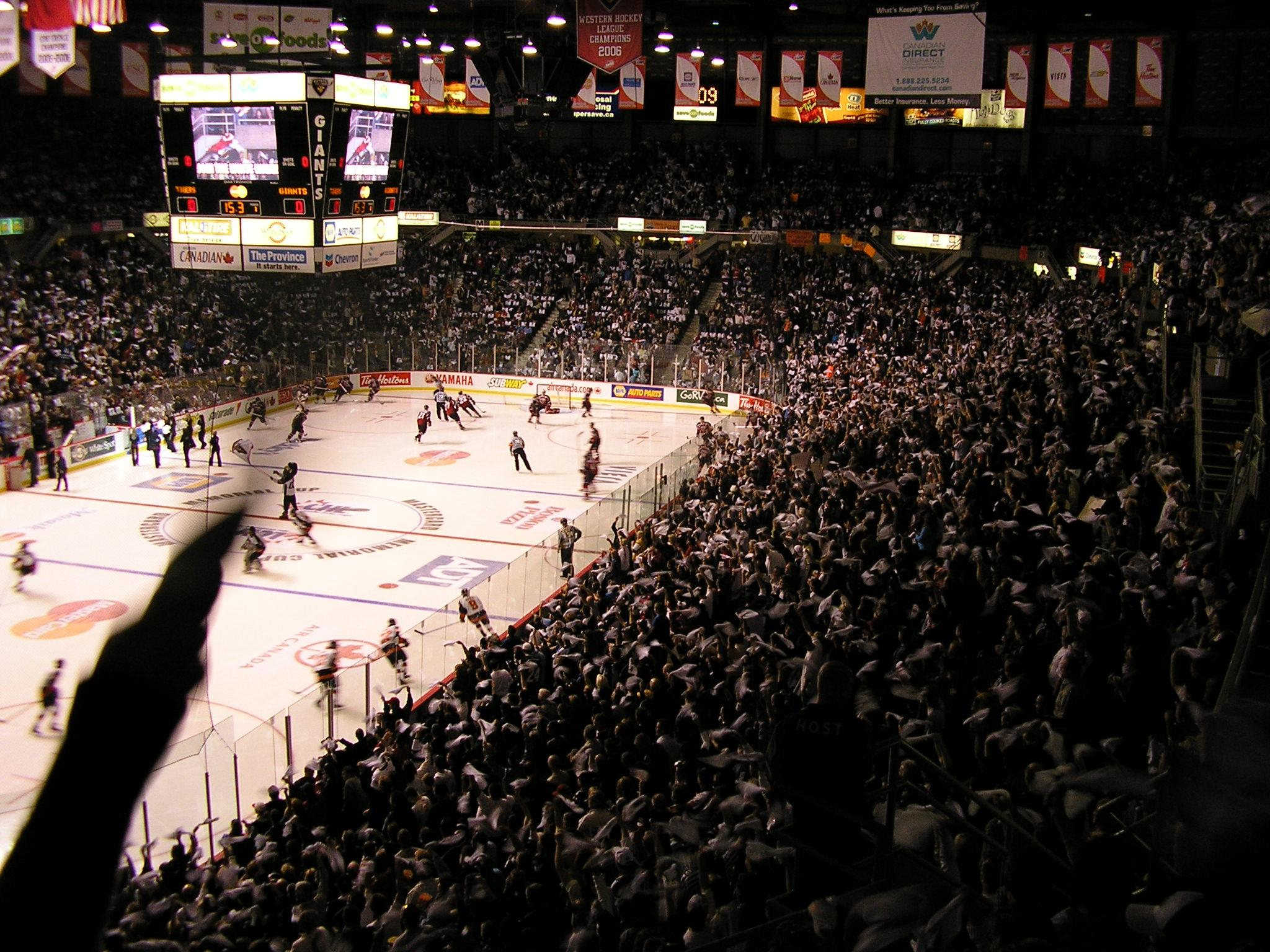
Fans waving towels prior to the Championship game

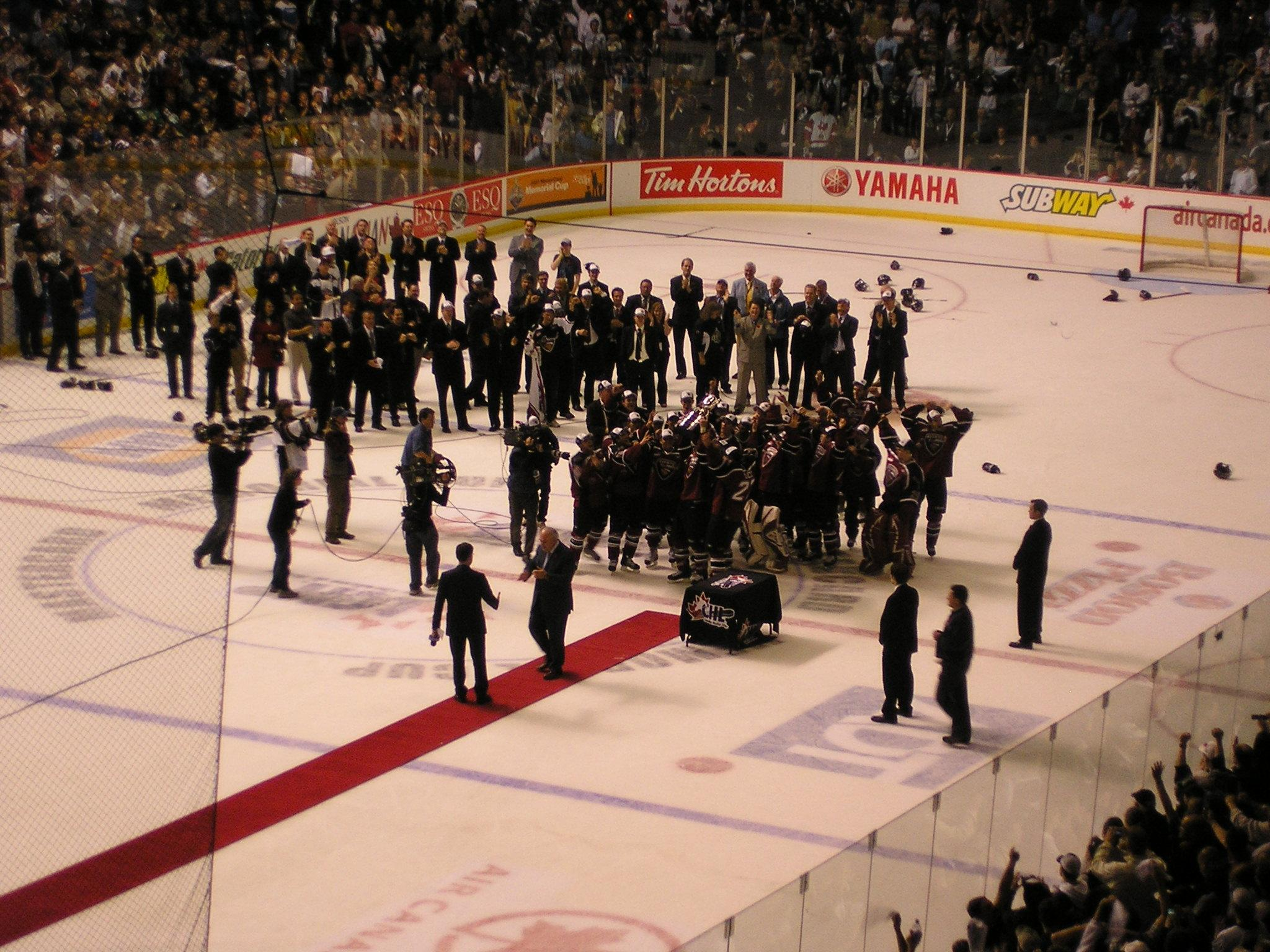
The Vancouver Giants celebrate winning the Memorial Cup

Player	GP	G	A	Pts	PIM
Michal Repik, Vancouver	5	3	4	7	4
Milan Lucic, Vancouver	5	2	5	7	12
Tom Sestito, Plymouth	5	2	5	7	6
James Neal, Plymouth	5	5	1	6	42
Mario Bliznak, Vancouver	5	1	5	6	2
Tyler Ennis, Medicine Hat	4	2	2	4	4
Kenndal McArdle, Vancouver	5	2	2	4	6
J. D. Watt, Vancouver	5	1	3	4	14
Spencer Machacek, Vancouver	5	3	0	3	0
Simon Courcelles, Lewiston	4	2	1	3	0
Evan Brophey, Plymouth	5	2	1	3	18
Andrew Fournier, Plymouth	5	2	1	3	0
Wacey Rabbit, Vancouver	5	2	1	3	2

== Leading goaltenders ==
Goalies Have To Play A Minimum Of 60 Minutes To Be Listed.

Player	GP	W	L	MINS	GA	GAA	SO	Sv%
Tyson Sexsmith, Vancouver	5	4	1	300	7	1.40	0	.936
Matt Keetley, Medicine Hat	4	2	2	238	6	1.51	1	.949
Jonathan Bernier, Lewiston	4	1	3	203	7	2.07	0	.940
Michal Neuvirth, Plymouth	5	2	3	219	11	3.02	0	.902
Jeremy Smith, Plymouth	2	0	0	91	7	4.63	0	.883

== Award winners ==
- Stafford Smythe Memorial Trophy (MVP): Milan Lucic, Vancouver
- George Parsons Trophy (Sportsmanship): Brennan Bosch, Medicine Hat
- Hap Emms Memorial Trophy (Goaltender): Matt Keetley, Medicine Hat
- Ed Chynoweth Trophy (Leading Scorer): Michal Repik, Vancouver

All-star team

- Goal: Matt Keetley, Medicine Hat
- Defence: Brendan Mikkelson, Vancouver; Cody Franson, Vancouver
- Forwards: Darren Helm, Medicine Hat; Michal Repik, Vancouver; Milan Lucic, Vancouver

== Road to the cup ==
=== OHL playoffs ===
Conference Quarterfinals
E1	Barrie	4
E8	Brampton	0
E3	Mississauga	1
E6	Sudbury	4
E2	Belleville	4
E7	Ottawa	1
E4	Oshawa	4
E5	Kingston	1
W1	London	4
W8	Owen Sound	0
W4	Saginaw	2
W5	S.S. Marie	4
W2	Plymouth	4
W7	Guelph	0
W3	Kitchener	4
W6	Sarnia	0

Conference Semifinals
E1	Barrie	0
E6	Sudbury	4
E2	Belleville	4
E4	Oshawa	0
W1	London	4
W5	S.S. Marie	3
W2	Plymouth	4
W3	Kitchener	1

Conference Finals
E6	Sudbury	4
E2	Belleville	2
W1	London	1
W2	Plymouth	4

Finals
E6	Sudbury	2
W2	Plymouth	4

=== QMJHL playoffs ===
First Round	Quarter Finals
1	Lewiston	4
8^{†}	Shawinigan	0
1	Lewiston	4
6	Halifax	1
3	Moncton	3
6	Halifax	4
Eastern
2	Cape Breton	4
7	St. John's	0
2	Cape Breton	4
5	Acadie-Bathurst	1
4	P.E.I.	3
5	Acadie-Bathurst	4
1	Val-d'Or	4
8	Chicoutimi	0
1	Val-d'Or	4
7	Baie-Comeau	1
2	Victoriaville	2
7	Baie-Comeau	4
Telus
4	Drummondville	4
5	Québec	1
4	Drummondville	3
6	Rouyn-Noranda	4
3	Gatineau	1
6	Rouyn-Noranda	4

Semi-Finals
1E	Lewiston	4
6T	Rouyn-Noranda	0
1T	Val-d'Or	4
2E	Cape Breton	3

President's Cup Finals
1E	Lewiston	4
1T	Val-d'Or	0

^{†}Shawinigan seeded 8th in Eastern division.

=== WHL playoffs ===
Conference Quarter-finals	Conference Semi-finals
E1	Brandon	4
E4	Prince Albert	1
E1	Brandon	2
C3	Calgary	4
C3	Calgary	4
C2	Kootenay	3
Eastern
C1	Medicine Hat	4
C4	Red Deer	3
C1	Medicine Hat	4
E2	Regina	0
E3	Swift Current	2
E2	Regina	4
B1	Vancouver	4
B4	Chilliwack	1
B1	Vancouver	4
U3	Seattle	1
U3	Seattle	4
U2	Tri-City	2
Western
U1	Everett	4
U4	Spokane	2
U1	Everett	2
B3	Prince George	4
B3	Prince George	4
B2	Kamloops	0

Conference Finals
C3	Calgary	1
C1	Medicine Hat	4
B1	Vancouver	4
B3	Prince George	1

WHL Championship
C1	Medicine Hat	4
B1	Vancouver	3
