= Brendan Mikkelson =

Canadian ice hockey player (born 1987)

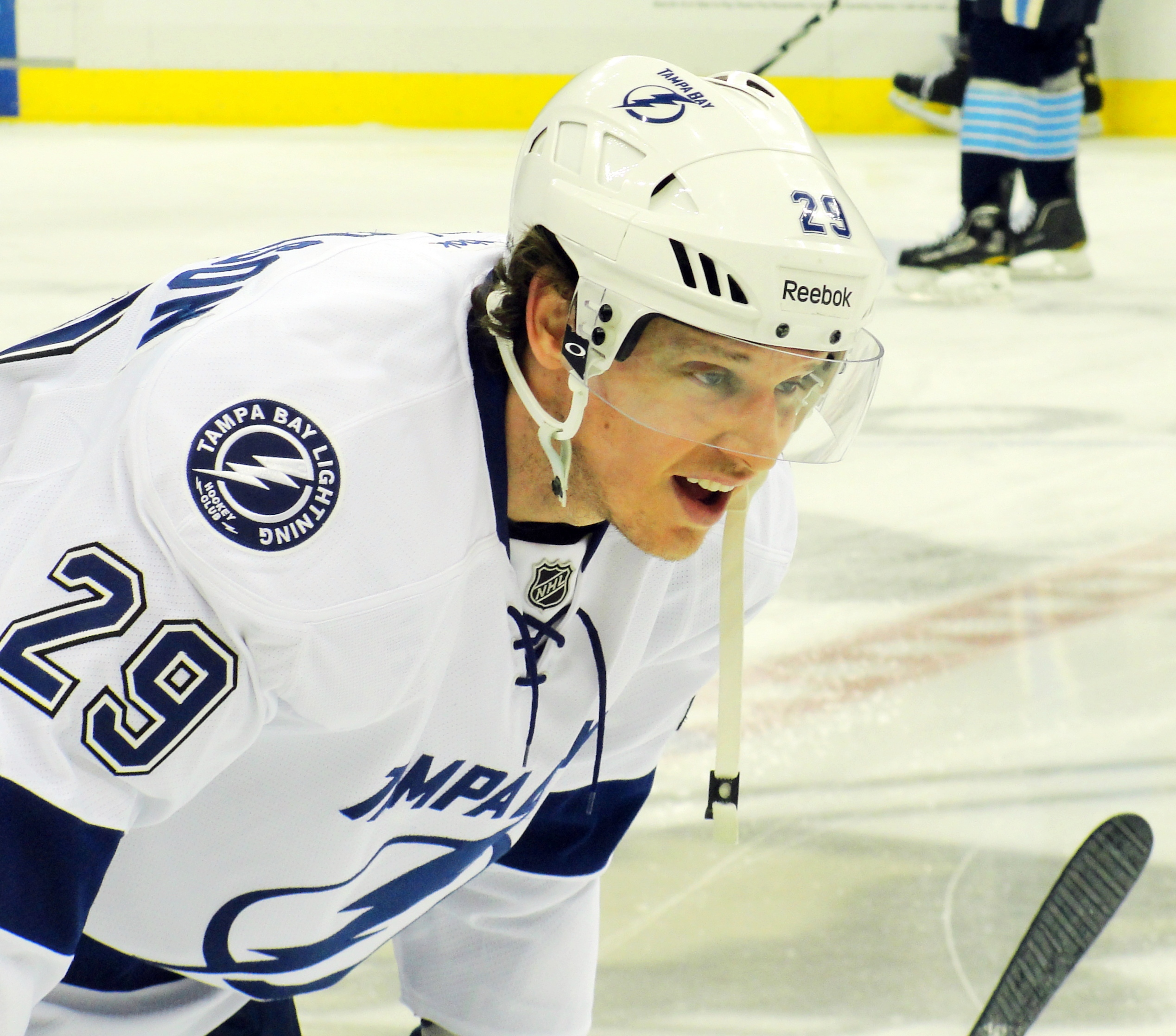
- Mikkelson with the Lightning in 2012.
- Born: June 22, 1987 (age 39) Regina, Saskatchewan, Canada
- Height: 6 ft 2 in (188 cm)
- Weight: 202 lb (92 kg; 14 st 6 lb)
- Position: Defence
- Shot: Left
- Played for: Anaheim Ducks; Calgary Flames; Tampa Bay Lightning; Luleå HF; Adler Mannheim; EC Red Bull Salzburg; Cardiff Devils
- NHL draft: 31st overall, 2005; Mighty Ducks of Anaheim
- Playing career: 2007–2022

Brendan Mikkelson (born June 22, 1987) is a Canadian former professional ice hockey defenceman who last played for Welsh team Cardiff Devils in the UK Elite Ice Hockey League (EIHL). He was a second round selection of the Mighty Ducks of Anaheim, 31st overall, at the 2005 NHL entry draft. He was a member of the 2007 Memorial Cup-winning Vancouver Giants team, and was named a tournament all-star on defence.

== Playing career ==
Mikkelson was born in Regina, Saskatchewan, and raised in St. Albert, Alberta, where he played Bantam hockey for the St. Albert Raiders of the Alberta Bantam Hockey League in 2001–02. He was a sixth-round pick in the 2002 WHL Bantam Draft. Mikkelson played his first two seasons in the WHL with the Portland Winter Hawks. Midway through his third season with the club (the 2005–06 season), he was traded to the Vancouver Giants. Mikkelson contributed 29 points in 69 games in the 2006–07 season, a season in which the Giants hosted and won the 2007 Memorial Cup.

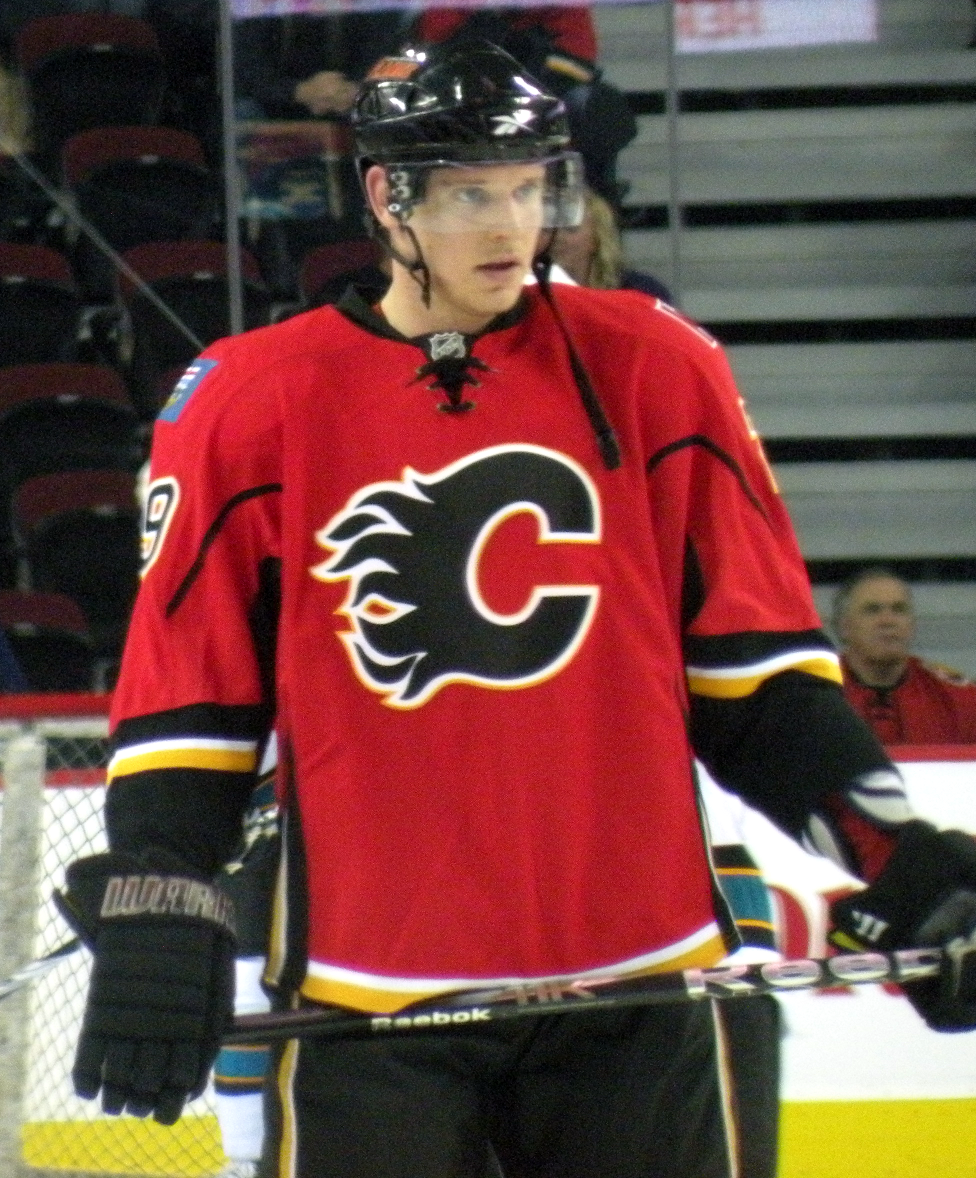
Mikkelson with the Flames in 2010.

Mikkelson was drafted by the Mighty Ducks of Anaheim in the second round, 31st overall, in the 2005 NHL entry draft. On November 30, 2006, he was signed to a three-year, entry-level contract with the Ducks. On October 19, 2010, Mikkelson was claimed by the Calgary Flames on waivers. On July 14, 2011, he signed a one-year contract extension with the Flames. The Flames traded Mikkelson to the Tampa Bay Lightning on January 6, 2012, in exchange for forward Blair Jones. He scored his first NHL goal on March 17, 2012, against Jaroslav Halák of the St. Louis Blues in a 3–1 Lightning defeat.

On July 19, 2013, Mikkelson left the Lightning organization as a free agent and signed a one-year, two-way contract with the Pittsburgh Penguins. He was assigned to Pittsburgh's American Hockey League (AHL) affiliate, the Wilkes-Barre/Scranton Penguins, for the duration of the 2013–14 season and registered a professional best 30 assists and 38 points in 73 games.

On September 28, 2014, the AHL's Toronto Marlies announced they had signed Mikkelson to a one-year contract.

On May 8, 2015, Luleå HF of the Swedish Hockey League announced they had Mikkelson to a two-year contract. After three seasons with Luleå HF, Mikkelson left as a free agent to continue his European career in Germany, having agreed to a one-year contract for the 2018–19 season with Adler Mannheim of the Deutsche Eishockey Liga (DEL) on July 2, 2018.

After a successful lone season in the DEL helping Adler claim the championship, Mikkelson signed a one-year contract in the neighbouring Austrian Hockey League (EBEL) with EC Red Bull Salzburg on June 18, 2019.

With the COVID-19 pandemic halting the season with Salzburg, Mikkelson left at the conclusion of his contract, returning to Sweden after signing a two-year contract with Modo Hockey of the Allsvenskan on April 24, 2020.

On May 21, 2021 it was announced that Mikkelson would be playing for the Cardiff Devils of the Elite Ice Hockey League (EIHL) in the 2021–22 season.

== Personal ==
Mikkelson's father Bill played in the NHL for the Los Angeles Kings, New York Islanders and Washington Capitals in the 1970s, while his sister, Meaghan, plays on the Canadian national women's team and won a gold medal at the 2010 and 2014 Winter Olympics. His brother-in-law, Scott Reid, is a career minor league goaltender. His great uncle, Jim McFadden, won the Calder Memorial Trophy in 1948 and the Stanley Cup in 1950.

== Career statistics ==
=== Regular season and playoffs ===
			Regular season					Playoffs
Season	Team	League	GP	G	A	Pts	PIM	GP	G	A	Pts	PIM
2003–04	Portland Winter Hawks	WHL	65	3	12	15	43	5	1	0	1	0
2004–05	Portland Winter Hawks	WHL	70	5	10	15	60	7	1	2	3	0
2005–06	Portland Winter Hawks	WHL	3	1	1	2	4	—	—	—	—	—
2005–06	Vancouver Giants	WHL	19	1	8	9	37	—	—	—	—	—
2006–07	Vancouver Giants	WHL	69	6	23	29	60	21	3	7	10	10
2007–08	Portland Pirates	AHL	66	6	10	16	50	14	2	6	8	2
2008–09	Iowa Chops	AHL	31	2	8	10	18	—	—	—	—	—
2008–09	Anaheim Ducks	NHL	34	0	2	2	17	—	—	—	—	—
2009–10	Toronto Marlies	AHL	49	7	15	22	43	—	—	—	—	—
2009–10	Anaheim Ducks	NHL	28	0	2	2	14	—	—	—	—	—
2010–11	Anaheim Ducks	NHL	5	0	1	1	7	—	—	—	—	—
2010–11	Calgary Flames	NHL	19	0	1	1	2	—	—	—	—	—
2010–11	Abbotsford Heat	AHL	4	0	1	1	4	—	—	—	—	—
2011–12	Abbotsford Heat	AHL	33	3	12	15	29	—	—	—	—	—
2011–12	Tampa Bay Lightning	NHL	41	1	2	3	13	—	—	—	—	—
2012–13	VIK Västerås HK	Allsv	17	3	4	7	20	—	—	—	—	—
2012–13	Tampa Bay Lightning	NHL	4	0	1	1	6	—	—	—	—	—
2012–13	Syracuse Crunch	AHL	13	0	2	2	6	13	2	0	2	2
2013–14	Wilkes–Barre/Scranton Penguins	AHL	73	8	30	38	62	17	1	5	6	22
2014–15	Toronto Marlies	AHL	60	9	14	23	54	5	2	0	2	0
2015–16	Luleå HF	SHL	51	6	8	14	22	11	2	1	3	12
2016–17	Luleå HF	SHL	42	5	8	13	10	—	—	—	—	—
2017–18	Luleå HF	SHL	50	0	12	12	24	3	0	1	1	0
2018–19	Adler Mannheim	DEL	47	6	8	14	16	14	0	3	3	14
2019–20	EC Red Bull Salzburg	EBEL	28	1	4	5	23	3	0	0	0	2
2020–21	Modo Hockey	Allsv	45	4	9	13	18	—	—	—	—	—
2021–22	Cardiff Devils	EIHL	47	3	16	19	33	4	0	2	2	31
AHL totals			329	35	92	127	266	49	7	11	18	26
NHL totals			131	1	9	10	59	—	—	—	—	—

Medal record

Ice hockey

Representing Canada Pacific

World U-17 Hockey Challenge
Silver medal – second place	2004 St. John's	

=== International ===
Year	Team	Event	Result	GP	G	A	Pts	PIM
2004	Canada Pacific	U17	2nd place, silver medalist(s)	6	1	1	2	4
2004	Canada	U18	1st place, gold medalist(s)	5	3	3	6	0
2005	Canada	WJC18	2nd place, silver medalist(s)	6	0	2	2	0
Junior totals				17	4	6	10	4

== Awards and honors ==
Awards	Year
CHL
Memorial Cup All-Star Team	2007
Memorial Cup (Vancouver Giants)	2007
DEL
Champion (Adler Mannheim)	2019
