= Spencer Machacek =

Canadian ice hockey player (born 1988)

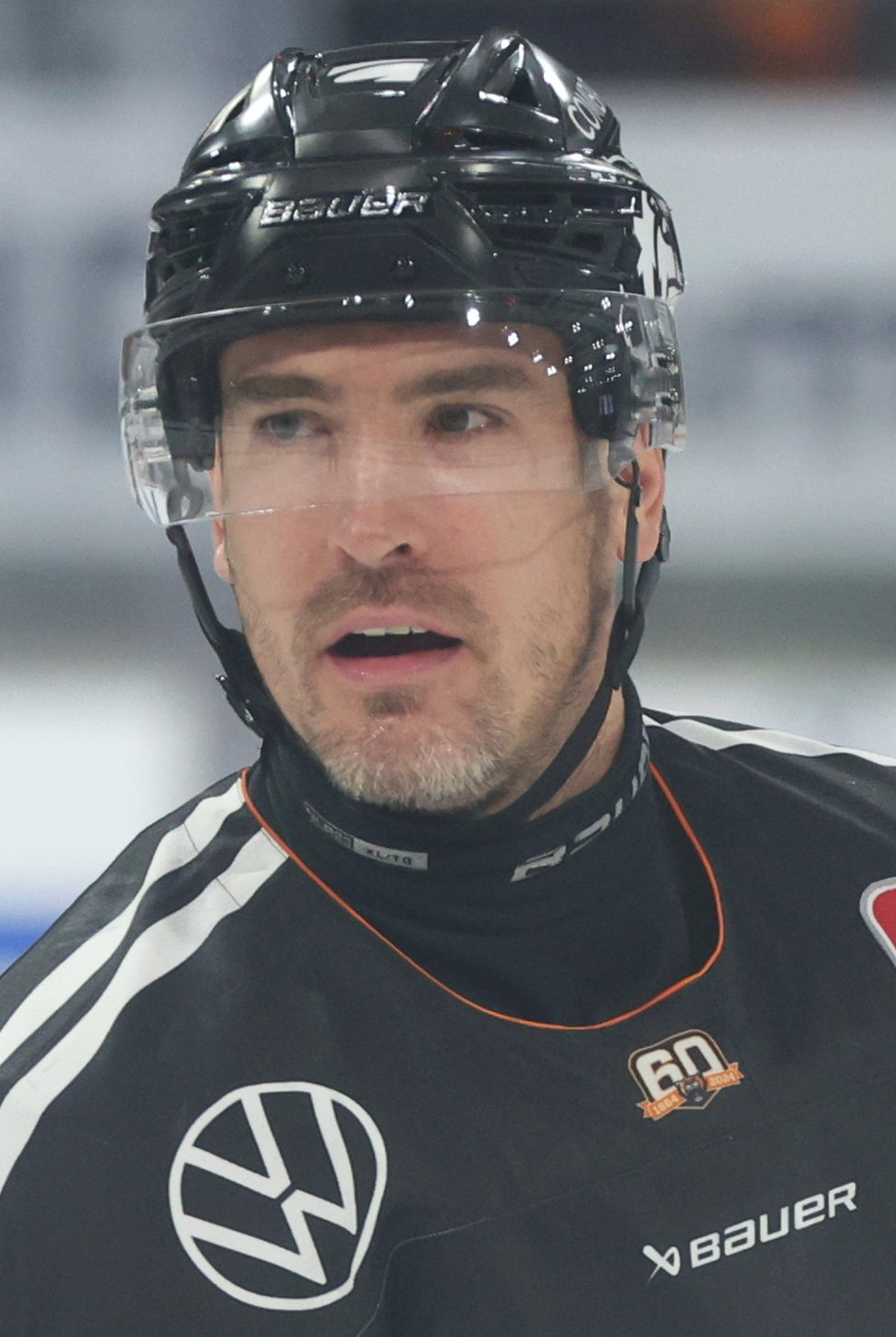
- Born: October 14, 1988 (age 38) Lethbridge, Alberta, Canada
- Height: 6 ft 1 in (185 cm)
- Weight: 182 lb (83 kg; 13 st 0 lb)
- Position: Right wing
- Shoots: Right
- DEL team Former teams: Grizzlys Wolfsburg; Atlanta Thrashers; Winnipeg Jets; Augsburger Panther; Eisbären Berlin; Düsseldorfer EG
- NHL draft: 67th overall, 2007; Atlanta Thrashers
- Playing career: 2008–present

Spencer Machacek (born October 14, 1988) is a Canadian professional ice hockey player who is currently under contract to Grizzlys Wolfsburg of the Deutsche Eishockey Liga (DEL).

== Playing career ==
=== Junior ===
Machacek began his major junior career in 2005–06 with the Vancouver Giants of the Western Hockey League (WHL). He recorded 45 points in each of his first two seasons, playing an integral part in the Giants' 2006 President's Cup and 2007 Memorial Cup championships.

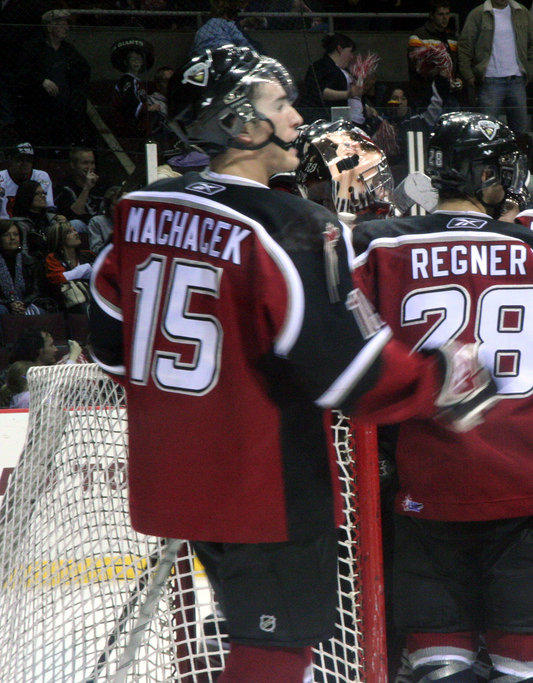
Machacek with the Vancouver Giants in 2007

Ranked 54th among North American skaters by the Central Scouting Service at the mid-season mark of his draft year, Machacek was selected by the Atlanta Thrashers in the 3rd round, 67th overall, in the 2007 NHL entry draft. Machacek returned to the WHL and was named team captain of the Giants (replacing the departed Brett Festerling) at the start of the 2007–08 season. Former teammate Milan Lucic had originally been chosen as Fersterling's successor, but made the Boston Bruins roster out of training camp. As team captain, he recorded career highs with 33 goals and 78 points in 70 games and was named Player of the Month for February after going on a 27-point tear in 14 games.

=== Professional ===
At the end of the first round of the 2008 WHL playoffs, he signed his first NHL contract with the Thrashers on March 28, 2008. Reporting to the Thrashers' training camp for the 2008–09 season, he was assigned to the Chicago Wolves of the American Hockey League (AHL) on September 27. Late in the season, he was called up by the Thrashers and made his NHL debut on March 16, 2009, in a 5–1 win against the Washington Capitals recording 7 minutes and 21 seconds of playing time. Machacek played two games total for the Thrashers in his professional rookie season while recording 48 points in 77 games in the AHL.

During the inaugural 2011–12 season for the Winnipeg Jets, Machacek scored his first NHL goal on March 23, 2012, against Washington's Michal Neuvirth. He finished the season with the Jets posting a promising 9 points in 13 games.

In the lockout shortened 2012–13 season, whilst with affiliate the St. John's IceCaps, he was traded by the Jets to the Columbus Blue Jackets in exchange for Tomas Kubalik on March 10, 2013.

In his first full season with Blue Jackets affiliate, the Springfield Falcons in the 2013–14 season, Machacek was again traded on February 6, 2014, to the Pittsburgh Penguins in exchange for Paul Thompson.

On October 8, 2014, after an unsuccessful try-out with the Toronto Maple Leafs, Machacek opted to sign his first contract abroad with German club, Augsburger Panther of the DEL.

After one season with Augsburg, Machacek opted to remain in the DEL for the 2015–16 season in signing with Eisbären Berlin on May 7. 2015. After two seasons in Berlin, Machacek left as a free agent to sign a one-year deal with his third DEL club, Düsseldorfer EG, on May 7, 2017. In the 2017–18 season, Machacek set new career DEL high of 13 goals for 28 points in 52 games with DEG.

On April 9, 2018, Machacek joined his fourth DEL club in five seasons by agreeing to terms on a one-year deal with Grizzlys Wolfsburg.

== Career statistics ==
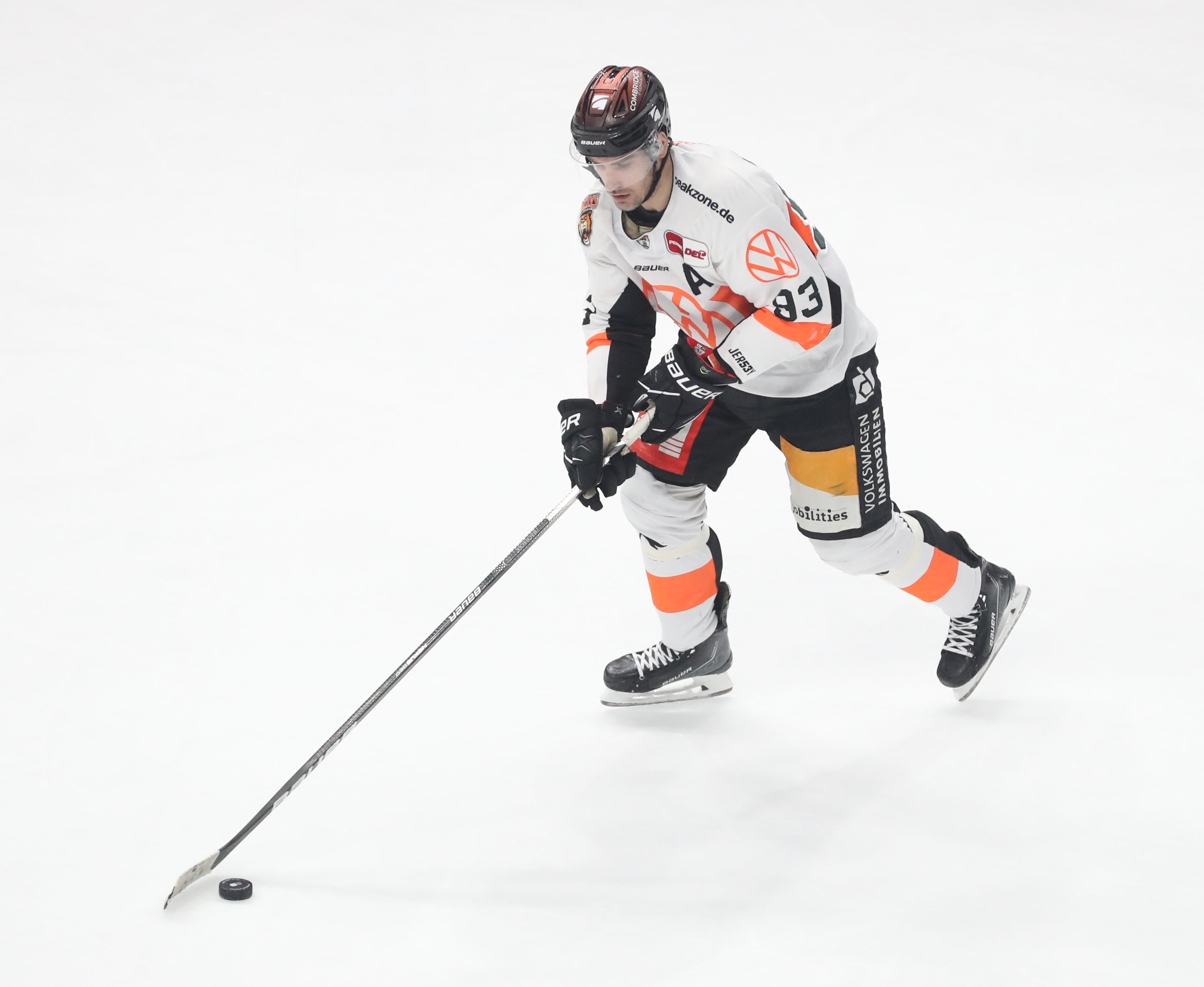
Machacek with Grizzlys Wolfsburg (2022)

			Regular season					Playoffs
Season	Team	League	GP	G	A	Pts	PIM	GP	G	A	Pts	PIM
2004–05	Brooks Bandits	AJHL	59	16	20	36	41	—	—	—	—	—
2005–06	Vancouver Giants	WHL	70	23	22	45	53	18	6	8	14	8
2006–07	Vancouver Giants	WHL	63	21	24	45	32	22	9	11	20	14
2007–08	Vancouver Giants	WHL	70	33	45	78	69	10	5	2	7	6
2008–09	Chicago Wolves	AHL	77	23	25	48	23	—	—	—	—	—
2008–09	Atlanta Thrashers	NHL	2	0	0	0	0	—	—	—	—	—
2009–10	Chicago Wolves	AHL	79	20	29	49	68	13	7	4	11	8
2010–11	Chicago Wolves	AHL	67	21	32	53	45	—	—	—	—	—
2010–11	Atlanta Thrashers	NHL	10	0	0	0	0	—	—	—	—	—
2011–12	St. John's IceCaps	AHL	61	18	32	50	48	11	0	7	7	12
2011–12	Winnipeg Jets	NHL	13	2	7	9	7	—	—	—	—	—
2012–13	St. John's IceCaps	AHL	57	11	14	25	45	—	—	—	—	—
2012–13	Springfield Falcons	AHL	18	5	9	14	13	6	0	1	1	0
2013–14	Springfield Falcons	AHL	34	9	10	19	24	—	—	—	—	—
2013–14	Wilkes-Barre/Scranton Penguins	AHL	22	10	4	14	15	13	1	4	5	18
2014–15	Augsburger Panther	DEL	43	8	27	35	100	—	—	—	—	—
2015–16	Eisbären Berlin	DEL	52	8	21	29	38	7	0	1	1	4
2016–17	Eisbären Berlin	DEL	51	6	10	16	40	6	1	2	3	6
2017–18	Düsseldorfer EG	DEL	52	13	15	28	42	—	—	—	—	—
2018–19	Grizzlys Wolfsburg	DEL	49	18	13	31	26	—	—	—	—	—
2019–20	Grizzlys Wolfsburg	DEL	52	15	17	32	26	—	—	—	—	—
2020–21	Grizzlys Wolfsburg	DEL	36	14	11	25	10	9	4	0	4	2
2021–22	Grizzlys Wolfsburg	DEL	54	18	21	39	63	8	1	1	2	9
2022–23	Grizzlys Wolfsburg	DEL	55	27	28	55	21	14	6	2	8	8
2023–24	Grizzlys Wolfsburg	DEL	52	23	16	39	40	4	0	0	0	6
2024–25	Grizzlys Wolfsburg	DEL	51	12	22	34	60	—	—	—	—	—
2025–26	Grizzlys Wolfsburg	DEL	52	19	20	39	26	2	0	1	1	0
NHL totals			25	2	7	9	7	—	—	—	—	—
DEL totals			599	181	220	401	492	50	12	7	19	35

== Awards and honours ==
Award	Year
WHL
Player of the Week (November 5–11)	2007
Player of the Month (February)	2008
Chicago Wolves
Dan Snyder Man of the Year Award	2011
