= Kenndal McArdle =

Canadian ice hockey player (born 1987)

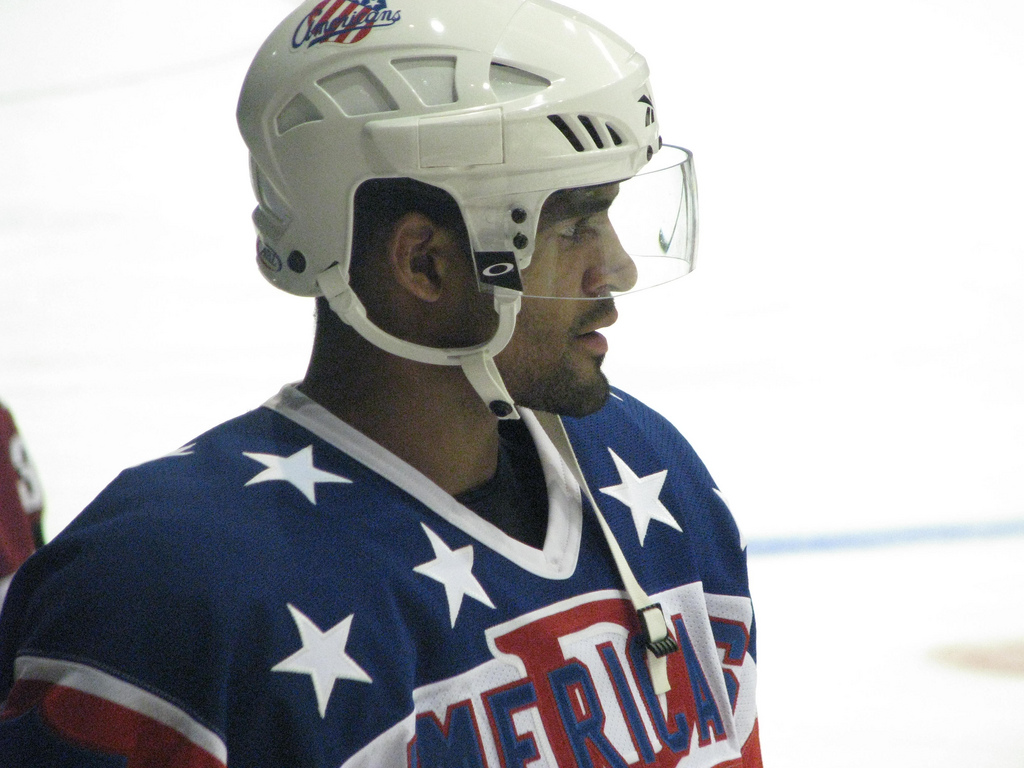
- McArdle with the Rochester Americans in 2009
- Born: January 4, 1987 (age 39) Toronto, Ontario, Canada
- Height: 5 ft 11 in (180 cm)
- Weight: 190 lb (86 kg; 13 st 8 lb)
- Position: Left wing
- Shot: Left
- Played for: Florida Panthers; Winnipeg Jets; Västerås HK
- NHL draft: 20th overall, 2005; Florida Panthers
- Playing career: 2007–2014

Kenndal McArdle (born January 4, 1987) is a Canadian former professional ice hockey left winger who played with the Florida Panthers and the Winnipeg Jets in the National Hockey League (NHL).

== Playing career ==
As a youth, McArdle played in the 2001 Quebec International Pee-Wee Hockey Tournament with a minor ice hockey team from Burnaby.

McArdle began his major junior career playing for the Moose Jaw Warriors of the Western Hockey League (WHL). He recorded his most prolific WHL season in 2004–05 with 37 goals and 74 points. In the off-season, he was drafted in the first round, 20th overall, in the 2005 NHL entry draft by the Florida Panthers.

Returning to the WHL, McArdle was traded to the Vancouver Giants in early December 2006. Later that month, he was named to Team Canada for the 2007 World Junior Championships, where he earned gold. He completed the 2006–07 season helping the Giants to the 2007 Memorial Cup championship as the host city.

Graduating from junior, McArdle was assigned by Florida to the Rochester Americans of the American Hockey League (AHL), where he scored 10 points in 36 games in his professional rookie season. He completed the 2007-08 season in the ECHL playing in six games, and scoring four points (three goals and one assist), for the Florida Everblades. McArdle also played in three Kelly Cup Playoff games.

The following season, in 2008–09, McArdle improved to 24 points in 58 games with the Americans. He also appeared in three NHL games. He made his NHL debut on December 2, 2008, skating a total of 5:26 of ice times in their 5–3 win at the Washington Capitals.

During his final year of his entry-level contract on January 23, 2010, McArdle scored his first NHL goal for the Panthers against Jonas Gustavsson of the Toronto Maple Leafs.

On July 8, 2011, McArdle was traded to the Winnipeg Jets in exchange for Angelo Esposito. McArdle made the opening night roster for the inaugural season of the Jets in the 2011–12 season. After he was kept scoreless in nine games with the Jets, he was reassigned to AHL affiliate, the St. John's IceCaps on November 18, 2011. McArdle contributed with 7 goals in 35 games with the IceCaps before he was again on the move, reassigned in an AHL trade to the Portland Pirates for the remainder of the season on March 2, 2012.

Without a contract offer from the Jets and with the uncertainty of the 2012–13 NHL lockout, McArdle was invited to an AHL try-out at the Norfolk Admirals training camp for the 2012–13 season. Failing to make the Calder Cup reigning Admirals, he was released from his try-out and on October 28, 2012, was signed to a one-year contract with the Greenville Road Warriors of the ECHL, marking his first return to the league since 2008. On January 24, 2013, the Chicago Blackhawks announced he had signed to an AHL contract with their affiliate, the Rockford IceHogs, for the remainder of the season.

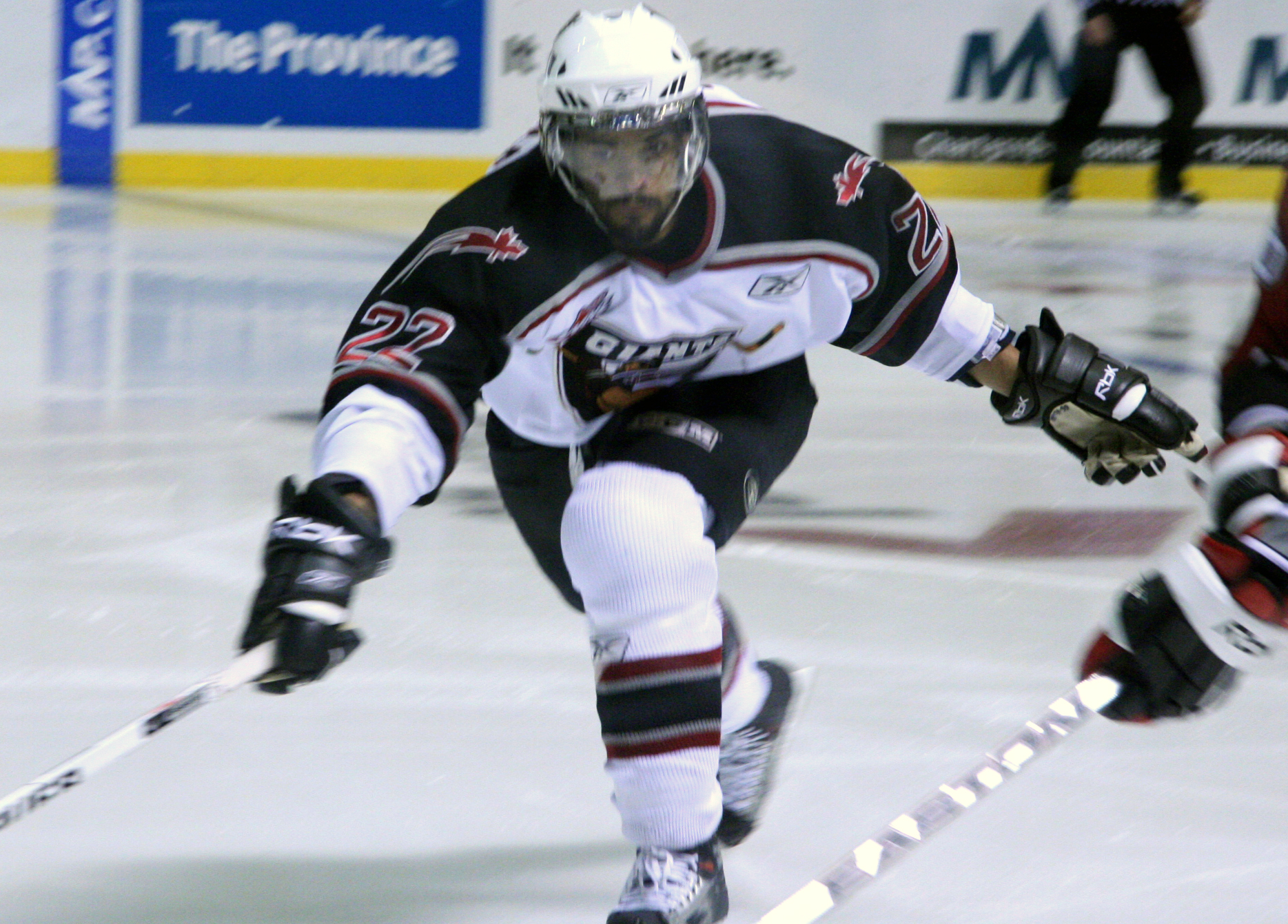
McArdle with the Vancouver Giants

On May 13, 2013, McArdle signed his first European contract in agreeing to a one-year deal with VIK Västerås HK of the Swedish HockeyAllsvenskan. After a successful season with Västerås, McArdle initially joined Malmö Redhawks on an optional two-year contract, but on July 31, 2014, he terminated his contract and opted to retire from professional hockey after securing an investment banking job in Vancouver.

== Awards ==
- Won a gold medal with Team Canada at the World Junior Championships in 2007.
- Won the Memorial Cup with the Vancouver Giants as CHL champions in 2007.

== Personal life ==
Born in Canada, McArdle is of Trinidadian descent.

== Career statistics ==
=== Regular season and playoffs ===
			Regular season					Playoffs
Season	Team	League	GP	G	A	Pts	PIM	GP	G	A	Pts	PIM
2002–03	Moose Jaw Warriors	WHL	2	0	0	0	0	—	—	—	—	—
2003–04	Moose Jaw Warriors	WHL	54	8	8	16	57	10	3	2	5	6
2004–05	Moose Jaw Warriors	WHL	70	37	37	74	122	5	1	0	1	16
2005–06	Moose Jaw Warriors	WHL	72	28	43	71	135	22	6	10	16	43
2006–07	Moose Jaw Warriors	WHL	26	10	10	20	75	—	—	—	—	—
2006–07	Vancouver Giants	WHL	37	9	13	22	54	22	11	9	20	49
2007–08	Rochester Americans	AHL	36	5	5	10	31	—	—	—	—	—
2007–08	Florida Everblades	ECHL	6	3	1	4	26	3	0	0	0	2
2008–09	Rochester Americans	AHL	58	12	12	24	79	—	—	—	—	—
2008–09	Florida Panthers	NHL	3	0	0	0	2	—	—	—	—	—
2009–10	Rochester Americans	AHL	18	3	5	8	63	—	—	—	—	—
2009–10	Florida Panthers	NHL	19	1	2	3	29	—	—	—	—	—
2010–11	Florida Panthers	NHL	11	0	0	0	16	—	—	—	—	—
2010–11	Rochester Americans	AHL	54	14	12	26	106	—	—	—	—	—
2011–12	Winnipeg Jets	NHL	9	0	0	0	4	—	—	—	—	—
2011–12	St. John's IceCaps	AHL	35	7	5	12	64	—	—	—	—	—
2011–12	Portland Pirates	AHL	19	3	3	6	34	—	—	—	—	—
2012–13	Greenville Road Warriors	ECHL	31	7	15	22	65	—	—	—	—	—
2012–13	Rockford IceHogs	AHL	30	3	2	5	55	—	—	—	—	—
2013–14	VIK Västerås HK	Allsv	45	11	13	24	44	10	2	3	5	8
AHL totals			250	47	44	91	432	—	—	—	—	—
NHL totals			42	1	2	3	51	—	—	—	—	—

=== International ===
Medal record

Representing Canada

Ice hockey

World Junior Championships
Gold medal – first place	2007 Sweden	

Year	Team	Event	Result	GP	G	A	Pts	PIM
2007	Canada	WJC	1st place, gold medalist(s)	6	0	0	0	0
Junior totals				6	0	0	0	0

Awards and achievements
Preceded by Rostislav Olesz	Florida Panthers first-round draft pick 2005	Succeeded by Michael Frolík
