= 2016–17 Serie A (ice hockey) season =

Italian professional ice hockey season

The 2016–17 Serie A season was the 83rd, and final season of the Serie A, the top level of ice hockey in Italy. 16 teams participated in the league, and Ritten Sport won the championship. Hockey Milano Rossoblu won the League Cup. After this season the Serie A was folded, and merged into multi-nation league called the Alps Hockey League.

== Regular season ==
	Club	Pts	W	OTW	OTL	L	GF	GA	GF–GA
1.	Ritten Sport	77	24	3	2	1	117	63	+54
2.	HC Pustertal	76	23	3	3	1	103	55	+48
3.	HDD Jesenice	63	20	8	1	1	120	66	+54
4.	EHC Lustenau	56	17	9	1	3	106	77	+29
4.	Asiago Hockey	56	16	10	4	0	102	64	+38
6.	VEU Feldkirch	55	18	11	0	1	112	89	+23
7.	SG Cortina	51	14	9	2	5	100	76	+24
8.	EK Zell am See	38	11	15	1	3	85	96	-11
8.	HC Neumarkt	38	10	15	3	2	87	97	-10
8.	EC Red Bull Salzburg 2	38	10	15	3	2	85	87	-2
11.	HC Gherdëina	36	9	15	3	3	84	104	-20
11.	WSV Sterzing Broncos	36	10	17	3	0	78	90	-12
13.	EC Kitzbühel	32	9	18	2	1	72	115	-43
14.	HC Fassa	26	6	18	2	4	79	126	-47
15.	EHC Bregenzerwald	25	7	19	0	4	76	118	-42
16.	EC KAC 2	17	3	22	3	2	60	143	-83

Clubs that qualified for the Alps Hockey League final four
