= James Wright (ice hockey) =

Canadian ice hockey player (born 1990)

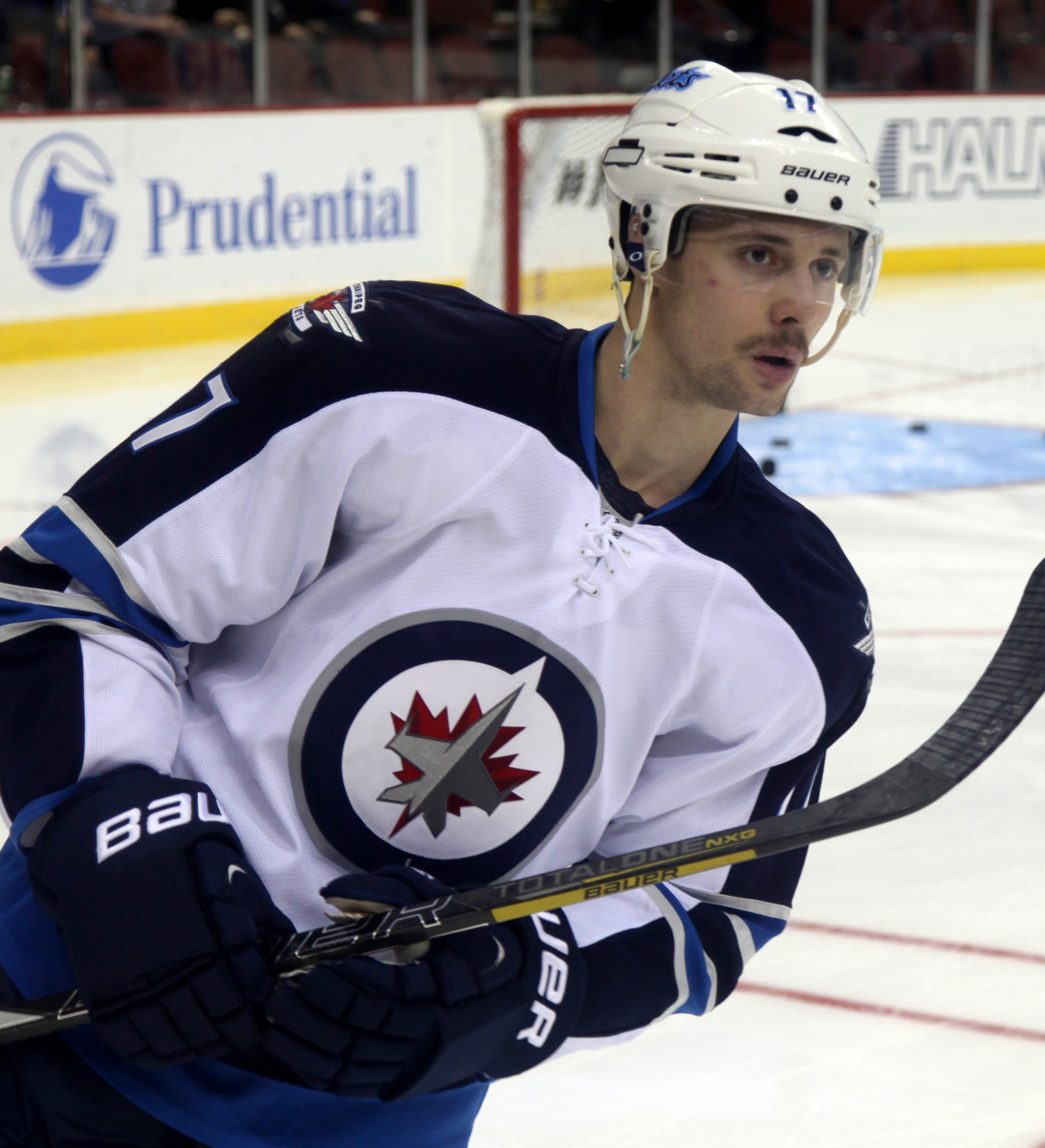
- Wright with the Winnipeg Jets in 2013
- Born: March 24, 1990 (age 36) Saskatoon, Saskatchewan, Canada
- Height: 6 ft 3 in (191 cm)
- Weight: 196 lb (89 kg; 14 st 0 lb)
- Position: Centre
- Shot: Left
- Played for: Tampa Bay Lightning; Winnipeg Jets; KHL Medveščak Zagreb; Admiral Vladivostok; Barys Astana; Linköpings HC
- NHL draft: 117th overall, 2008; Tampa Bay Lightning
- Playing career: 2009–2019

James Wright (born March 24, 1990) is a Canadian former professional ice hockey centre. He won a Memorial Cup with the Vancouver Giants in 2007 and was selected by Tampa Bay 117th overall in the 2008 NHL entry draft.

== Playing career ==
=== Junior ===
Wright began his major junior career with the Vancouver Giants in 2005–06, debuting in two WHL games. The following season, he recorded 12 points in 48 games during his WHL rookie season. He helped the Giants finish as league runner-up in the playoffs to the Medicine Hat Tigers before winning the 2007 Memorial Cup championship against the same Tigers squad in the CHL title final. In 2007–08, Wright improved to 36 points and was drafted 117th overall by the Tampa Bay Lightning in the 2008 NHL entry draft. Upon being drafted, Wright continued to play for the Giants, scoring 21 goals and 47 points in 2008–09.

=== Professional ===
Wright made the Lightning roster for the start of the 2009–10 season, making his NHL debut on October 3, 2009, in a 6–3 loss to the Atlanta Thrashers. He played the game opposite former Giants linemate Evander Kane of the Thrashers, who was also playing his first NHL game. Wright scored his first NHL goal in his seventh game on October 22, 2009, against Evgeni Nabokov of the San Jose Sharks.

After scoring two goals and three assists through 48 games, he was sent back to the Giants on January 21, 2010. Returning to the WHL, he notched six goals and 19 points through the final 21 games of the 2009–10 WHL season. In the playoffs, the Giants advanced to the semifinals, where they were eliminated in six games by the Tri-City Americans. Wright recorded seven goals and 16 points in 16 post-season games.

Wright began the 2010-11 season in the AHL. He played 15 games for the Lightning's top affiliate, the Norfolk Admirals, before making his 2010–11 NHL season debut for Tampa Bay in an away game against the Philadelphia Flyers on November 18, 2010. On December 2, 2011, Wright was traded by the Lightning, along with Mike Vernace, to the Florida Panthers for Mike Kostka and Evan Oberg. He was then immediately assigned to AHL affiliate, the San Antonio Rampage. On January 18, 2013, the eve of the 2012–13 season, Wright was claimed off waivers from the Panthers by the Winnipeg Jets.

After two seasons with the Jets, Wright was released as a free agent, and with limited interest around the league, signed his first contract abroad with Croatian club KHL Medveščak Zagreb of the Kontinental Hockey League, on September 15, 2014.

On July 2, 2015, Wright returned to North America, signing a one-year, two-way contract with the New York Islanders. He was assigned to AHL affiliate, the Bridgeport Sound Tigers for the duration of the 2015–16 season.

In the following off-season, having been unable to add to his NHL resume, Wright returned to the KHL, signing a one-year deal with Russian club, Admiral Vladivostok on September 8, 2016. Agreeing to return for a second season in Vladivostok in 2017–18, Wright was traded by the club to Kazakhstani outfit, Barys Astana in exchange for Martin St. Pierre on November 24, 2017.

As a free agent following the season with Barys Astana, Wright left the KHL and ventured to Sweden in agreeing to an optional two-year contract with Linköpings HC of the SHL on July 23, 2018. The optional second year on his contract with the Swedish club was cancelled at the end of the 2018–19 season.

== Personal life ==
Wright is the grandson of former Saskatoon mayor Cliff Wright. The elder Wright served as the city's mayor from 1976 to 1988 and was instrumental in the construction of Saskatchewan Place, which opened at the end of his term in 1988.

== Career statistics ==
| | | | Regular season | | | | | Playoffs |
| Season | Team | League | GP | G | A | Pts | PIM | GP | G | A | Pts | PIM |
|---|---|---|---|---|---|---|---|---|---|---|---|---|
| 2005–06 | Vancouver Giants | WHL | 2 | 0 | 0 | 0 | 2 | — | — | — | — | — |
| 2006–07 | Vancouver Giants | WHL | 48 | 5 | 7 | 12 | 31 | 14 | 3 | 1 | 4 | 0 |
| 2007–08 | Vancouver Giants | WHL | 60 | 13 | 23 | 36 | 21 | 6 | 1 | 0 | 1 | 2 |
| 2008–09 | Vancouver Giants | WHL | 71 | 21 | 26 | 47 | 54 | 17 | 3 | 7 | 10 | 13 |
| 2009–10 | Tampa Bay Lightning | NHL | 48 | 2 | 3 | 5 | 18 | — | — | — | — | — |
| 2009–10 | Vancouver Giants | WHL | 21 | 6 | 13 | 19 | 17 | 16 | 7 | 9 | 16 | 4 |
| 2010–11 | Norfolk Admirals | AHL | 80 | 16 | 31 | 47 | 64 | 6 | 1 | 0 | 1 | 8 |
| 2010–11 | Tampa Bay Lightning | NHL | 1 | 0 | 0 | 0 | 0 | — | — | — | — | — |
| 2011–12 | Norfolk Admirals | AHL | 22 | 1 | 4 | 5 | 6 | — | — | — | — | — |
| 2011–12 | San Antonio Rampage | AHL | 54 | 11 | 17 | 28 | 23 | 10 | 3 | 4 | 7 | 2 |
| 2012–13 | San Antonio Rampage | AHL | 40 | 5 | 12 | 17 | 31 | — | — | — | — | — |
| 2012–13 | Winnipeg Jets | NHL | 38 | 2 | 3 | 5 | 31 | — | — | — | — | — |
| 2013–14 | Winnipeg Jets | NHL | 59 | 0 | 2 | 2 | 15 | — | — | — | — | — |
| 2014–15 | KHL Medveščak Zagreb | KHL | 53 | 15 | 4 | 19 | 39 | — | — | — | — | — |
| 2015–16 | Bridgeport Sound Tigers | AHL | 73 | 14 | 27 | 41 | 53 | 2 | 0 | 0 | 0 | 0 |
| 2016–17 | Admiral Vladivostok | KHL | 55 | 13 | 12 | 25 | 44 | 6 | 1 | 0 | 1 | 2 |
| 2017–18 | Admiral Vladivostok | KHL | 26 | 2 | 6 | 8 | 12 | — | — | — | — | — |
| 2017–18 | Barys Astana | KHL | 15 | 3 | 2 | 5 | 6 | — | — | — | — | — |
| 2018–19 | Linköping HC | SHL | 44 | 5 | 6 | 11 | 10 | — | — | — | — | — |
| NHL totals | | | 146 | 4 | 8 | 12 | 64 | — | — | — | — | — |
