= Anton Krysanov =

Russian ice hockey player

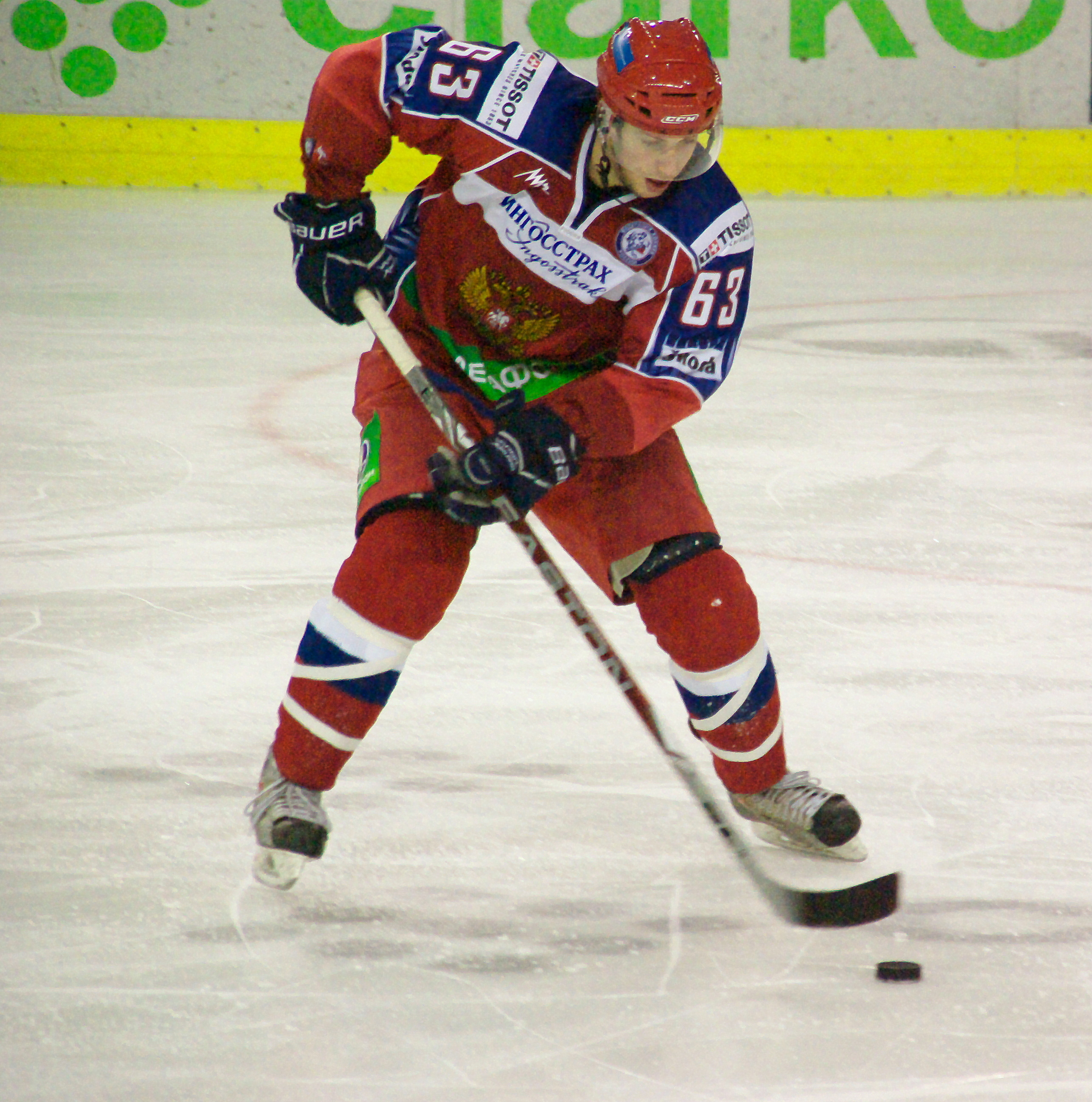
- Born: March 25, 1987 (age 39) Tolyatti, Soviet Union
- Height: 6 ft 3 in (191 cm)
- Weight: 205 lb (93 kg; 14 st 9 lb)
- Position: Centre
- Shot: Left
- team Former teams: Free Agent; Lada Togliatti; Dynamo Moscow; Neftekhimik Nizhnekamsk; HC Yugra; Avtomobilist Yekaterinburg; Amur Khabarovsk; HC Vityaz
- NHL draft: 148th overall, 2005; Phoenix Coyotes
- Playing career: 2004–2021

Anton Krysanov (born March 25, 1987) is a Russian professional ice hockey player. He is currently an unrestricted free agent who most recently played with Dnipro Kherson in the Ukrainian Hockey League. He was drafted 148th overall in the fifth round of the 2005 NHL entry draft by the Phoenix Coyotes.

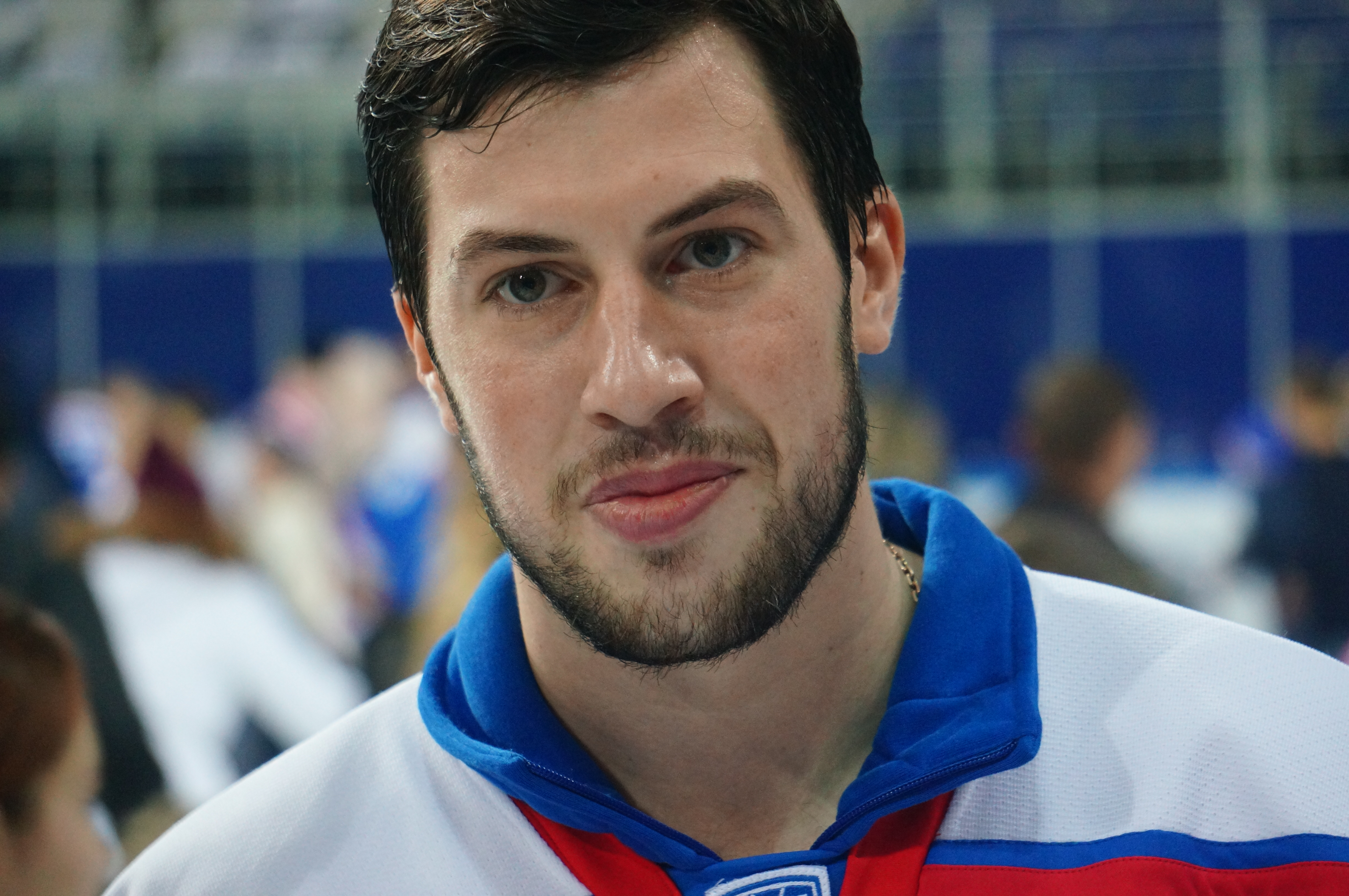

== Career statistics ==
=== Regular season and playoffs ===
			Regular season					Playoffs
Season	Team	League	GP	G	A	Pts	PIM	GP	G	A	Pts	PIM
2002–03	Lada–2 Togliatti	RUS.3	12	2	4	6	4	—	—	—	—	—
2003–04	Lada–2 Togliatti	RUS.3	18	2	2	4	2	4	2	1	3	6
2004–05	Lada Togliatti	RSL	15	1	0	1	4	—	—	—	—	—
2004–05	Lada–2 Togliatti	RUS.3	34	13	12	25	14	—	—	—	—	—
2005–06	Lada Togliatti	RSL	46	3	3	6	24	8	0	0	0	2
2005–06	Lada–2 Togliatti	RUS.3	1	0	0	0	0	—	—	—	—	—
2006–07	Lada Togliatti	RSL	48	1	15	16	14	3	0	0	0	4
2006–07	Lada–2 Togliatti	RUS.3	7	5	5	10	4	—	—	—	—	—
2007–08	Lada Togliatti	RSL	54	9	11	20	22	4	0	1	1	0
2007–08	Lada–2 Togliatti	RUS.3	2	2	1	3	2	—	—	—	—	—
2008–09	Lada Togliatti	KHL	46	8	10	18	14	5	0	3	3	4
2008–09	Lada–2 Togliatti	RUS.3	3	0	1	1	2	—	—	—	—	—
2009–10	Dynamo Moscow	KHL	41	8	6	14	14	2	0	0	0	2
2010–11	Neftekhimik Nizhnekamsk	KHL	33	4	9	13	12	5	1	0	1	2
2011–12	Neftekhimik Nizhnekamsk	KHL	8	0	0	0	4	—	—	—	—	—
2011–12	HC Yugra	KHL	10	2	4	6	2	5	1	1	2	8
2012–13	HC Yugra	KHL	35	8	10	18	16	—	—	—	—	—
2013–14	HC Yugra	KHL	22	1	5	6	2	—	—	—	—	—
2014–15	Avtomobilist Yekaterinburg	KHL	17	0	5	5	4	—	—	—	—	—
2014–15	HK Lipetsk	VHL	2	1	0	1	0	—	—	—	—	—
2014–15	Amur Khabarovsk	KHL	22	3	4	7	18	—	—	—	—	—
2015–16	Vityaz Podolsk	KHL	6	0	2	2	0	—	—	—	—	—
2015–16	Lada Togliatti	KHL	42	7	4	11	18	—	—	—	—	—
2016–17	Lada Togliatti	KHL	25	2	2	4	6	—	—	—	—	—
2016–17	Amur Khabarovsk	KHL	20	2	6	8	12	—	—	—	—	—
2017–18	Tsen Tou Jilin City	VHL	35	8	12	20	10	4	1	1	2	0
2018–19	Tsen Tou Jilin City	VHL	13	2	1	3	4	—	—	—	—	—
2019–20	Dnipro Kherson	UKR	—	—	—	—	—	4	0	1	1	6
2020–21	Dnipro Kherson	UKR	39	12	18	30	12	8	3	2	5	0
RSL totals			163	14	29	43	64	15	0	1	1	6
KHL totals			327	45	67	112	122	17	2	4	6	16

=== International ===
Year	Team	Event	Result	GP	G	A	Pts	PIM
2004	Russia	U17	5th	5	1	0	1	8
2004	Russia	U18	5th	4	0	1	1	29
2005	Russia	WJC18	5th	6	0	3	3	8
2007	Russia	WJC	2nd place, silver medalist(s)	6	0	3	3	0
Junior totals				21	1	6	7	45
