= Denis Istomin (ice hockey) =

Russian ice hockey player (born 1987)

- Born: January 12, 1987 (age 39) Chelyabinsk, Soviet Union
- Height: 6 ft 0 in (183 cm)
- Weight: 196 lb (89 kg; 14 st 0 lb)
- Position: Right wing
- Shot: Left
- Played for: Traktor Chelyabinsk; Vityaz Chekhov; Metallurg Magnitogorsk; Torpedo Nizhny Novgorod
- National team: Russia
- NHL draft: 117th overall, 2005; Chicago Blackhawks
- Playing career: 2005–2008

For the Uzbek professional tennis player, see Denis Istomin.

Denis Dmitrovich Istomin (Russian: Денис Дмитриевич Истомин; born 12 January 1987) is a Russian professional ice hockey forward. He was drafted 117th overall in the 2005 NHL entry draft by the Chicago Blackhawks of the National Hockey League.

== Career statistics ==
=== Regular season and playoffs ===
			Regular season					Playoffs
Season	Team	League	GP	G	A	Pts	PIM	GP	G	A	Pts	PIM
2002–03	Metallurg–2 Magnitogorsk	RUS.3	1	0	0	0	0	—	—	—	—	—
2003–04	Metallurg–2 Magnitogorsk	RUS.3	20	4	4	8	4	—	—	—	—	—
2004–05	Traktor Chelyabinsk	RUS.2	42	11	5	16	24	8	1	1	2	4
2004–05	Traktor–2 Chelyabinsk	RUS.3	1	0	0	0	0	—	—	—	—	—
2005–06	Vityaz Chekhov	RSL	46	4	4	8	6	—	—	—	—	—
2005–06	Vityaz–2 Chekhov	RUS.3	6	1	2	3	2	—	—	—	—	—
2005–06	Torpedo Nizhny Novgorod	RUS.2	4	0	3	3	2	3	2	1	3	0
2005–06	Torpedo–2 Nizhny Novgorod	RUS.3	2	0	1	1	0	—	—	—	—	—
2006–07	Metallurg Magnitogorsk	RSL	6	0	1	1	6	—	—	—	—	—
2006–07	Metallurg–2 Magnitogorsk	RUS.3	9	5	4	9	0	—	—	—	—	—
2006–07	Vityaz Chekhov	RSL	15	0	3	3	6	—	—	—	—	—
2006–07	Vityaz–2 Chekhov	RUS.3	28	16	6	22	44	—	—	—	—	—
2007–08	Kapitan Stupino	RUS.2	20	2	11	13	4	—	—	—	—	—
RUS.3 totals			67	26	17	43	50	—	—	—	—	—
RUS.2 totals			66	13	19	32	30	11	2	3	5	4
RSL totals			67	4	8	12	18	—	—	—	—	—

=== International ===
Year	Team	Event	GP	G	A	Pts	PIM
2004	Russia	U17	5	1	3	4	12
2004	Russia	U18	5	0	2	2	6
2005	Russia	WJC18	4	0	2	2	2
Junior totals			14	1	7	8	20
