= Juho Mielonen =

Finnish ice hockey player (born 1987)

- Born: 1 March 1987 (age 39) Savonlinna, Finland
- Height: 6 ft 3 in (191 cm)
- Weight: 185 lb (84 kg; 13 st 3 lb)
- Position: Defence
- Shot: Right
- SM-liiga team: Ässät
- NHL draft: 175th overall, 2005; Detroit Red Wings
- Playing career: 2005–2016

Juho Mielonen (born 1 March 1987) is a Finnish professional ice hockey defenceman who currently plays for HPK of the SM-liiga. Mielonen was drafted 175th overall by the Detroit Red Wings in the 2005 NHL entry draft.

== Career statistics ==
=== Regular season and playoffs ===
			Regular season					Playoffs
Season	Team	League	GP	G	A	Pts	PIM	GP	G	A	Pts	PIM
2002–03	Ilves	FIN U18	11	0	1	1	8	—	—	—	—	—
2003–04	Ilves	FIN U18	15	7	2	9	12	—	—	—	—	—
2003–04	Ilves	FIN U20	28	1	2	3	16	—	—	—	—	—
2004–05	Ilves	FIN U18	1	1	0	1	0	—	—	—	—	—
2004–05	Ilves	FIN U20	38	2	9	11	32	9	0	1	1	6
2005–06	Ilves	FIN U20	7	1	2	3	6	3	0	0	0	4
2005–06	Ilves	SM-l	17	0	1	1	4	—	—	—	—	—
2005–06	Suomi U20	Mestis	3	0	0	0	2	—	—	—	—	—
2006–07	Ilves	FIN U20	8	2	5	7	7	5	0	0	0	20
2007–08	SaiPa	FIN U20	13	4	9	13	34	—	—	—	—	—
2007–08	SaiPa	SM-l	31	1	2	3	24	—	—	—	—	—
2007–08	SaPKo	Mestis	7	1	5	6	14	—	—	—	—	—
2008–09	SaiPa	SM-l	12	0	0	0	2	—	—	—	—	—
2009–10	SaiPa	SM-l	46	8	12	20	56	—	—	—	—	—
2009–10	Jukurit	Mestis	2	0	2	2	2	—	—	—	—	—
2010–11	Ässät	SM-l	42	2	7	9	38	3	0	0	0	0
2011–12	Ässät	SM-l	11	0	0	0	4	1	0	0	0	0
2011–12	HIFK	SM-l	5	0	2	2	4	—	—	—	—	—
2011–12	Mora IK	Allsv	8	0	4	4	6	—	—	—	—	—
2012–13	HPK	SM-l	40	2	5	7	32	5	1	2	3	4
2013–14	Dragons de Rouen	FRA	7	0	0	0	2	9	1	2	3	10
2014–15	Ducs de Dijon	FRA	21	1	6	7	58	13	2	2	4	12
2015–16	LeKi	Mestis	12	0	5	5	6	—	—	—	—	—
2015–16	Chamonix HC	FRA	19	1	6	7	18	—	—	—	—	—
SM-l totals			204	13	29	42	164	9	1	2	3	4

=== International ===
Year	Team	Event	GP	G	A	Pts	PIM
2004	Finland	U17	5	0	1	1	12
2005	Finland	WJC18	6	1	1	2	4
Junior totals			11	1	2	3	16
