= Petr Kalus =

Czech professional ice hockey player (born 1987)

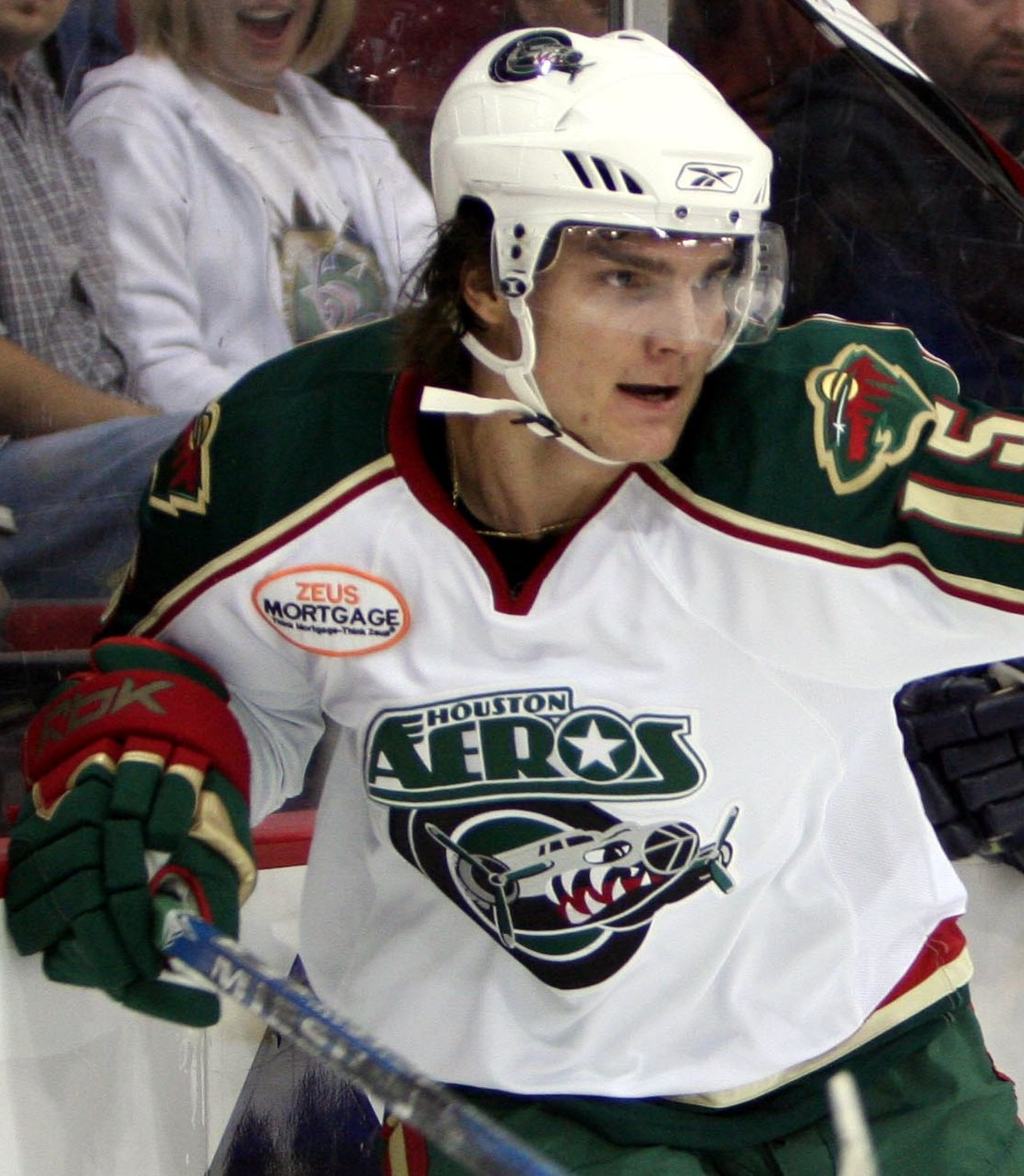
- Kalus with the Houston Aeros in 2007
- Born: 29 June 1987 (age 39) Ostrava, Czechoslovakia
- Height: 6 ft 1 in (185 cm)
- Weight: 212 lb (96 kg; 15 st 2 lb)
- Position: Right wing
- Shot: Left
- Played for: HC Vitkovice; Boston Bruins; Minnesota Wild; HC MVD; HC Slavia Praha; Modo Hockey; SC Fassa; Djurgårdens IF; Nottingham Panthers; Herning Blue Fox; Grenoble; Orli Znojmo; Cracovia Krakow
- National team: Czech Republic
- NHL draft: 39th overall, 2005; Boston Bruins
- Playing career: 2004–2018

Petr Kalus (born 29 June 1987) is a Czech retired ice hockey player. He played for many teams during his career, which lasted from 2004 to 2018, including 11 games with the Boston Bruins and Minnesota Wild of the National Hockey League between 2006 and 2010. Internationally Kalus played for the Czech national junior team at the junior level.

== Playing career ==
Kalus played three years of junior hockey with HC Vítkovice in the Czech Republic before coming to play for the Regina Pats. Kalus was drafted in the second round, 39th overall, in the 2005 NHL entry draft by the Boston Bruins. In his first season playing North American hockey, Kalus led the Pats in scoring with 58 points in 60 games. He then signed a three-year entry-level contract with the Bruins on 8 May 2006.

In the 2006–07 season, Kalus played 43 games for the Providence Bruins of the American Hockey League (AHL) with 30 points. He also played nine games for the Boston Bruins with five points. In Kalus' Bruins games, he scored on his first three shots, a feat previously not done in the NHL since 1996.

On 30 June 2007, Kalus was traded by the Bruins, along with a fourth-round pick to the Minnesota Wild for goaltender Manny Fernandez. He was assigned to the Houston Aeros of the AHL. At the start of the 2008–09 season on 18 October 2008, Kalus left the Houston Aeros to play for HC MVD of the KHL, with the Wild retaining Kalus' rights through 30 June 2010.

Following a disappointing season with MVD Kalus decided on 26 June 2009 to return to the Wild for the 2009–10 season. During the 2010-11 season, Kalus' tenure with the Wild ended when he was traded to the Columbus Blue Jackets for future considerations on 1 March 2011. He was immediately assigned to AHL affiliate, the Springfield Falcons.

On 27 April 2011, Kalus signed a try-out contract with Jokerit of the SM-liiga. He was selected to return to his native Czech Republic with HC Slavia Praha before joining team MODO of the Swedish Elite Serien. He went on to have stints for a number of European teams, like Italian club HC Fassa, and Djurgarden IF.

In October 2016, Kalus rejoined British club Nottingham Panthers. It proved to be a short second stint with the Panthers as, in November 2016, Kalus was released in order to make way for Kristián Kudroč.

== Career statistics ==
=== Regular season and playoffs ===
			Regular season					Playoffs
Season	Team	League	GP	G	A	Pts	PIM	GP	G	A	Pts	PIM
2001–02	HC Sareza Ostrava	CZE U18	9	4	0	4	8	—	—	—	—	—
2001–02	HC Vítkovice	CZE U18	12	0	1	1	8	—	—	—	—	—
2002–03	HC Vítkovice	CZE U18	28	6	20	26	51	—	—	—	—	—
2002–03	HC Vítkovice	CZE U20	11	0	0	0	4	—	—	—	—	—
2003–04	HC Vítkovice	CZE U18	9	7	5	12	60	7	3	5	8	2
2003–04	HC Vítkovice	CZE U20	41	8	8	16	67	—	—	—	—	—
2004–05	HC Vítkovice	CZE U20	39	20	11	31	161	2	2	0	2	25
2004–05	HC Vítkovice	ELH	1	0	0	0	0	—	—	—	—	—
2005–06	Regina Pats	WHL	60	36	22	58	87	6	4	1	5	6
2006–07	Providence Bruins	AHL	43	13	17	30	110	9	1	0	1	12
2006–07	Boston Bruins	NHL	9	4	1	5	6	—	—	—	—	—
2007–08	Houston Aeros	AHL	58	8	10	18	57	—	—	—	—	—
2008–09	Houston Aeros	AHL	2	0	0	0	0	—	—	—	—	—
2008–09	HC MVD	KHL	17	0	2	2	106	—	—	—	—	—
2009–10	Houston Aeros	AHL	66	12	11	23	77	—	—	—	—	—
2009–10	Minnesota Wild	NHL	2	0	0	0	0	—	—	—	—	—
2010–11	Houston Aeros	AHL	34	6	2	8	68	—	—	—	—	—
2010–11	Springfield Falcons	AHL	10	1	0	1	4	—	—	—	—	—
2011–12	HC Slavia Praha	ELH	30	3	4	7	136	—	—	—	—	—
2011–12	Modo Hockey	SEL	13	1	2	3	2	6	0	1	1	0
2012–13	SC Fassa	ITA	20	8	14	22	36	—	—	—	—	—
2012–13	Djurgårdens IF	Allsv	20	4	6	10	45	4	1	1	2	29
2013–14	HK Dukla Trenčín	SVK	3	0	1	1	0	—	—	—	—	—
2013–14	Djurgårdens IF	Allsv	2	0	0	0	2	—	—	—	—	—
2013–14	Nottingham Panthers	EIHL	42	20	20	40	47	2	0	1	1	2
2014–15	Herning Blue Fox	DEN	35	21	18	39	178	9	2	0	2	31
2015–16	Brûleurs de Loups	FRA	20	6	15	21	65	—	—	—	—	—
2016–17	Orli Znojmo	EBEL	3	0	0	0	0	—	—	—	—	—
2016–17	Nottingham Panthers	EIHL	6	1	1	2	5	—	—	—	—	—
2016–17	Cracovia Krakow	POL	17	5	8	13	35	13	6	8	14	14
2017–18	Cracovia Krakow	POL	33	15	8	23	56	12	0	8	8	33
AHL totals			213	40	40	80	316	9	1	0	1	12
NHL totals			11	4	1	5	6	—	—	—	—	—
KHL totals			17	0	2	2	106	—	—	—	—	—

=== International ===
Year	Team	Event	GP	G	A	Pts	PIM
2004	Czech Republic	U18	5
2005	Czech Republic	WJC18	7	0	3	3	12
2006	Czech Republic	WJC	5	1	0	1	4
Junior totals			12	1	3	4	16
