= Johan Dahlberg =

Swedish professional ice hockey winger

- Born: February 3, 1987 (age 39) Kramfors, Sweden
- Height: 6 ft 2 in (188 cm)
- Weight: 196 lb (89 kg; 14 st 0 lb)
- Position: Left wing
- Shot: Left
- Played for: Modo Hockey
- NHL draft: 173rd overall, 2005; Toronto Maple Leafs
- Playing career: 2005–2015

Johan Dahlberg (born February 3, 1987) is a Swedish professional ice hockey winger who played with Modo Hockey during the 2005–06 Elitserien season. He was selected by the Toronto Maple Leafs in the 6th round (173rd overall) of the 2005 NHL entry draft.

== Career statistics ==
=== Regular season and playoffs ===
			Regular season					Playoffs
Season	Team	League	GP	G	A	Pts	PIM	GP	G	A	Pts	PIM
2002–03	Kramfors–Alliansen	SWE.3	19	2	0	2	10	—	—	—	—	—
2003–04	Modo Hockey	J18 Allsv	14	3	2	5	64	3	0	0	0	14
2003–04	Modo Hockey	J20	1	0	0	0	0	—	—	—	—	—
2004–05	Modo Hockey	J20	33	10	5	15	78	4	0	0	0	4
2005–06	Modo Hockey	J20	41	18	9	27	194	2	1	0	1	12
2005–06	Modo Hockey	SEL	2	0	0	0	0	—	—	—	—	—
2006–07	IF Sundsvall Hockey	Allsv	44	2	2	4	101	—	—	—	—	—
2007–08	Hudiksvalls HC	SWE.3	31	11	11	22	119	—	—	—	—	—
2008–09	Hudiksvalls HC	SWE.3	31	8	10	18	61	—	—	—	—	—
2009–10	Hudiksvalls HC	SWE.3	9	6	3	9	12	4	2	0	2	29
2010–11	Hudiksvalls HC	SWE.3	39	19	12	31	98	5	0	0	0	6
2011–12	Hudiksvalls HC	SWE.3	35	17	15	32	90	3	1	0	1	25
2012–13	Örnsköldsviks HF	SWE.3	21	3	4	7	65	—	—	—	—	—
2013–14	Ulvö HK	SWE.4	16	13	10	23	28	—	—	—	—	—
2014–15	Ulvö HK	SWE.4	8	8	7	15	35	—	—	—	—	—
SWE.3 totals			185	66	55	121	455	12	3	0	3	60

=== International ===
Year	Team	Event	GP	G	A	Pts	PIM
2004	Sweden	U18
2005	Sweden	WJC18	7	1	0	1	8
Junior totals			7	1	0	1	8
