= Tomáš Pospíšil (ice hockey) =

Czech ice hockey player

- Born: 25 August 1987 (age 38) Šumperk, Czechoslovakia
- Height: 6 ft 0 in (183 cm)
- Weight: 185 lb (84 kg; 13 st 3 lb)
- Position: Left wing
- Shoots: Right
- Czech team Former teams: HC Verva Litvínov; HC Oceláři Třinec; Sarnia Sting; Chicago Wolves; Gwinnett Gladiators; Albany River Rats; HC Šumperk; HC Kometa Brno; HC Slavia Praha; HC Bílí Tygři Liberec; Mountfield HK; Piráti Chomutov; BK Mladá Boleslav; HC Benátky nad Jizerou; HC Shakhtyor Soligorsk; MsHK Žilina; HC Nové Zámky
- NHL draft: 135th overall, 2005; Atlanta Thrashers
- Playing career: 2007–present

Tomáš Pospíšil (born 25 August 1987) is a Czech professional ice hockey forward currently playing for HC Verva Litvínov of the Czech Extraliga.

== Playing career ==
Pospíšil played senior hockey for HC Oceláři Třinec (2004–2005) before moving to Canada with junior team Sarnia Sting in the Ontario Hockey League (2005–2007). He was drafted 135th over by Atlanta in the 2005 NHL entry draft. He has yet to play in the National Hockey League, splitting 2007–2008 with the Chicago Wolves of the American Hockey League and the Gwinnett Gladiators of the ECHL.

== Career statistics ==
=== Regular season and playoffs ===
			Regular season					Playoffs
Season	Team	League	GP	G	A	Pts	PIM	GP	G	A	Pts	PIM
1999–2000	HC Papíroví Draci Šumperk	CZE.2 U18	4	0	3	3	2	—	—	—	—	—
2000–01	HC Papíroví Draci Šumperk	CZE.2 U18	30	12	8	20	8	—	—	—	—	—
2001–02	HC Oceláři Třinec	CZE U18	47	15	16	31	14	6	1	1	2	6
2002–03	HC Oceláři Třinec	CZE U18	41	24	28	52	44	2	0	1	1	2
2002–03	HC Oceláři Třinec	CZE U20	2	0	0	0	0	2	0	0	0	0
2003–04	HC Oceláři Třinec	CZE U18	3	3	3	6	14	5	5	2	7	26
2003–04	HC Oceláři Třinec	CZE U20	45	14	11	25	40	2	1	1	2	0
2004–05	HC Oceláři Třinec	CZE U20	38	19	18	37	44	5	4	1	5	27
2004–05	HC Oceláři Třinec	ELH	14	0	0	0	0	—	—	—	—	—
2005–06	Sarnia Sting	OHL	60	25	30	55	61	—	—	—	—	—
2006–07	Sarnia Sting	OHL	55	29	38	67	38	4	1	5	6	4
2007–08	Chicago Wolves	AHL	11	0	2	2	2	—	—	—	—	—
2007–08	Gwinnett Gladiators	ECHL	54	18	23	41	18	8	2	3	5	6
2008–09	Chicago Wolves	AHL	31	1	1	2	14	—	—	—	—	—
2008–09	Gwinnett Gladiators	ECHL	2	2	1	3	2	—	—	—	—	—
2008–09	Albany River Rats	AHL	17	1	3	4	4	—	—	—	—	—
2009–10	HC Oceláři Třinec	ELH	36	4	6	10	6	5	0	0	0	2
2009–10	Salith Šumperk	CZE.2	4	3	2	5	14	—	—	—	—	—
2010–11	HC Kometa Brno	ELH	17	0	1	1	31	—	—	—	—	—
2010–11	HC Slavia Praha	ELH	35	6	2	8	6	19	6	7	13	14
2011–12	HC Kometa Brno	ELH	28	8	11	19	30	—	—	—	—	—
2011–12	HC Slavia Praha	ELH	22	7	8	16	58	—	—	—	—	—
2012–13	HC Slavia Praha	ELH	14	1	4	5	2	—	—	—	—	—
2012–13	Bílí Tygři Liberec	ELH	25	13	7	20	14	—	—	—	—	—
2013–14	Bílí Tygři Liberec	ELH	30	5	5	10	10	—	—	—	—	—
2013–14	Mountfield HK	ELH	14	2	4	6	8	6	1	3	4	0
2014–15	Mountfield HK	ELH	35	5	7	12	18	3	0	1	1	2
2015–16	Piráti Chomutov	ELH	42	12	10	22	22	—	—	—	—	—
2016–17	BK Mladá Boleslav	ELH	33	3	7	10	14	5	2	0	2	2
2016–17	HC Benátky nad Jizerou	CZE.2	5	1	4	5	6	—	—	—	—	—
2017–18	Shakhtyor Soligorsk	BLR	13	1	5	6	35	—	—	—	—	—
2017–18	MsHK DOXXbet Žilina	SVK	25	7	14	21	18	6	1	2	3	0
2018–19	HC Nové Zámky	SVK	27	12	14	26	10	4	2	2	4	16
2019–20	HC Nové Zámky	SVK	41	18	24	42	32	—	—	—	—	—
2019–20	HC Verva Litvínov	ELH	12	8	9	17	16	—	—	—	—	—
2020–21	HC Verva Litvínov	ELH	48	11	19	30	51	3	1	0	1	6
2021–22	HC Verva Litvínov	ELH	17	2	3	5	8	—	—	—	—	—
2021–22	BK Mladá Boleslav	ELH	24	1	12	13	12	—	—	—	—	—
ELH totals			446	88	116	204	306	41	10	11	21	26
SVK totals			93	37	52	89	60	10	3	4	7	16

=== International ===
Year	Team	Event	GP	G	A	Pts	PIM
2004	Czech Republic	U18	5	2
2005	Czech Republic	WJC18	7	0	2	2	4
2007	Czech Republic	WJC	5	0	0	0	2
Junior totals			12	0	2	2	6
