= Jakub Vojta (ice hockey) =

Czech ice hockey player (born 1987)

- Born: February 8, 1987 (age 39) Ústí nad Labem, Czechoslovakia
- Height: 6 ft 1 in (185 cm)
- Weight: 196 lb (89 kg; 14 st 0 lb)
- Shot: Right
- Played for: HK Nitra; HC Sparta Praha
- NHL draft: 94th overall, 2005; Carolina Hurricanes
- Playing career: 2007–2014

Jakub Vojta (born February 8, 1987) is a Czech former professional ice hockey defenceman. He played in the Slovak Extraliga and the Czech Extraliga.

== Career ==
Vojta was selected by the Carolina Hurricanes in the 4th round (94th overall) of the 2005 NHL entry draft. He made his Slovak Extraliga debut with HK Nitra during the 2007–08 Slovak Extraliga season.

Vojta played for the Czech Republic in the 2007 World Junior Ice Hockey Championships. The team made it to the quarter-final where they met Sweden, losing 1–5. Due to a knee injury from the 2011–2012 season, Vojta was not under contract in that season.

== Career statistics ==
=== Regular season and playoffs ===
			Regular season					Playoffs
Season	Team	League	GP	G	A	Pts	PIM	GP	G	A	Pts	PIM
2000–01	HC Slovan Ústí nad Labem	CZE.2 U18	30	2	15	17	18	3	0	1	1	2
2001–02	HC Sparta Praha	CZE U18	48	8	20	28	44	6	1	1	2	4
2002–03	HC Sparta Praha	CZE U18	47	14	24	38	89	1	0	0	0	12
2003–04	HC Sparta Praha	CZE U18	4	0	2	2	0	3	1	2	3	2
2003–04	HC Sparta Praha	CZE U20	39	3	3	6	20	—	—	—	—	—
2004–05	HC Sparta Praha	CZE U20	38	2	7	9	42	8	1	1	2	8
2005–06	Ottawa 67's	OHL	65	2	22	24	114	6	0	1	1	6
2006–07	Ottawa 67's	OHL	58	6	10	16	76	5	0	3	3	4
2007–08	HK Ardo Nitra	SVK U20	6	2	2	4	4	—	—	—	—	—
2007–08	HK Ardo Nitra	SVK	50	0	4	4	32	—	—	—	—	—
2008–09	HC Sparta Praha	ELH	10	0	0	0	24	—	—	—	—	—
2008–09	HC VCES Hradec Králové, a.s.	CZE.2	28	1	9	10	16	—	—	—	—	—
2008–09	HC Berounští Medvědi	CZE.2	4	0	1	1	4	—	—	—	—	—
2009–10	HC Sparta Praha	ELH	5	0	0	0	0	3	0	0	0	0
2009–10	HC Berounští Medvědi	CZE.2	33	0	7	7	24	—	—	—	—	—
2010–11	IHC KOMTERM Písek	CZE.2	15	0	1	1	10	—	—	—	—	—
2011–12	SK Kadaň	CZE.2	11	1	1	2	8	—	—	—	—	—
2013–14	Mighty Dogs Schweinfurt	GER.3	31	3	11	14	10	—	—	—	—	—
ELH totals			15	0	0	0	24	3	0	0	0	0
CZE.2 totals			91	2	19	21	62	—	—	—	—	—

=== International ===
Year	Team	Event	GP	G	A	Pts	PIM
2004	Czech Republic	U18	5	2
2005	Czech Republic	WJC18	7	1	0	1	8
2007	Czech Republic	WJC	6	0	3	3	8
Junior totals			13	1	3	4	16
