= Tomáš Kudělka =

Czech ice hockey player

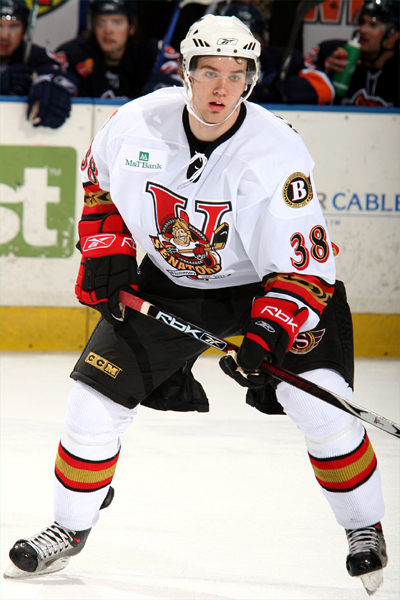
- Kudělka with the Binghamton Senators during the 2006-07 season
- Born: 10 March 1987 (age 39) Gottwaldov, Czechoslovakia
- Height: 6 ft 3 in (191 cm)
- Weight: 195 lb (88 kg; 13 st 13 lb)
- Position: Defence
- Shoots: Left
- KHL team: HC Budivelnyk
- National team: Czech Republic
- NHL draft: 136th overall, 2005; Ottawa Senators
- Playing career: 2004–present

Tomáš Kudělka (born 10 March 1987) is a Czech professional ice hockey defenceman currently playing for HC TPS of the SM-liiga. He was drafted in the fifth round, 136th overall in the 2005 NHL entry draft by the Ottawa Senators of the National Hockey League.

== Playing career ==
Kudělka attracted the attention of pro scouts while playing for Zlin ZPS in the Czech League in 2003–2005. After being drafted by the Ottawa Senators, Kudělka moved to Lethbridge, Alberta, where he played two seasons for the Lethbridge Hurricanes of the Western Hockey League. During those two seasons, Kudělka made brief appearances with the Binghamton Senators, before making the team full-time for the 2007–08 season. He also played for the Czech national Junior team in the 2006 and 2007 World Junior Hockey Championships.

On 20 May 2010, Kudělka returned to Europe signing a contract with HC Budivelnyk of the Russian KHL.

== Career statistics ==
=== Regular season and playoffs ===
			Regular season					Playoffs
Season	Team	League	GP	G	A	Pts	PIM	GP	G	A	Pts	PIM
2002–03	HC Hamé Zlín	CZE U18	45	1	16	17	28	3	1	0	1	12
2003–04	HC Hamé Zlín	CZE U18	1	0	0	0	2	3	0	0	0	0
2003–04	HC Hamé Zlín	CZE U20	51	1	12	13	97	7	0	0	0	0
2003–04	HC Hamé Zlín	ELH	3	0	0	0	0	—	—	—	—	—
2004–05	HC Hamé Zlín	CZE U20	38	9	8	17	38	—	—	—	—	—
2004–05	HC Hamé Zlín	ELH	4	0	0	0	6	—	—	—	—	—
2005–06	Lethbridge Hurricanes	WHL	64	6	25	31	77	6	1	1	2	12
2005–06	Binghamton Senators	AHL	5	0	0	0	4	—	—	—	—	—
2006–07	Lethbridge Hurricanes	WHL	59	14	27	41	74	—	—	—	—	—
2006–07	Binghamton Senators	AHL	11	1	2	3	8	—	—	—	—	—
2007–08	Binghamton Senators	AHL	35	1	1	2	17	—	—	—	—	—
2007–08	Elmira Jackals	ECHL	23	5	14	19	26	1	0	0	0	0
2008–09	Binghamton Senators	AHL	76	7	16	23	67	—	—	—	—	—
2009–10	Binghamton Senators	AHL	55	3	17	20	81	—	—	—	—	—
2010–11	HC Eaton Pardubice	ELH	9	0	0	0	12	—	—	—	—	—
2010–11	TPS	SM-l	43	1	5	6	46	—	—	—	—	—
2011–12	HC Vítkovice Steel	ELH	52	3	16	19	24	6	1	4	5	2
2012–13	HC Vítkovice Steel	ELH	21	3	5	8	10	10	0	0	0	0
2013–14	HC Vítkovice Steel	ELH	47	1	10	11	38	8	1	0	1	0
2014–15	Pelicans	Liiga	29	0	3	3	33	—	—	—	—	—
2014–15	HC Vítkovice Steel	ELH	13	0	3	3	8	4	0	0	0	0
2015–16	HC Vítkovice Steel	ELH	44	3	13	16	16	—	—	—	—	—
2016–17	Piráti Chomutov	ELH	37	3	3	6	18	6	0	1	1	2
2017–18	KHL Medveščak Zagreb	AUT	54	1	12	13	28	6	1	2	3	2
2018–19	KHL Medveščak Zagreb	AUT	24	2	4	6	8	—	—	—	—	—
2018–19	HC TWK Innsbruck	AUT	25	2	4	6	16	—	—	—	—	—
2019–20	VHK ROBE Vsetín	CZE.2	25	2	8	10	12	—	—	—	—	—
2020–21	VHK ROBE Vsetín	CZE.2	30	2	3	5	16	14	0	1	1	12
2021–22	Chamonix HC	FRA	21	1	3	4	47	—	—	—	—	—
2021–22	HC Zubr Přerov	CZE.2	15	1	2	3	14	5	0	1	1	9
ELH totals			230	13	50	63	132	34	2	5	7	4
AHL totals			182	12	36	48	173	—	—	—	—	—

=== International ===
Year	Team	Event	GP	G	A	Pts	PIM
2004	Czech Republic	U18	5	2
2005	Czech Republic	WJC18	7	0	4	4	6
2006	Czech Republic	WJC	6	1	0	1	10
2007	Czech Republic	WJC	6	1	2	3	6
Junior totals			19	2	6	8	22
