= Cody Bass =

Canadian ice hockey player

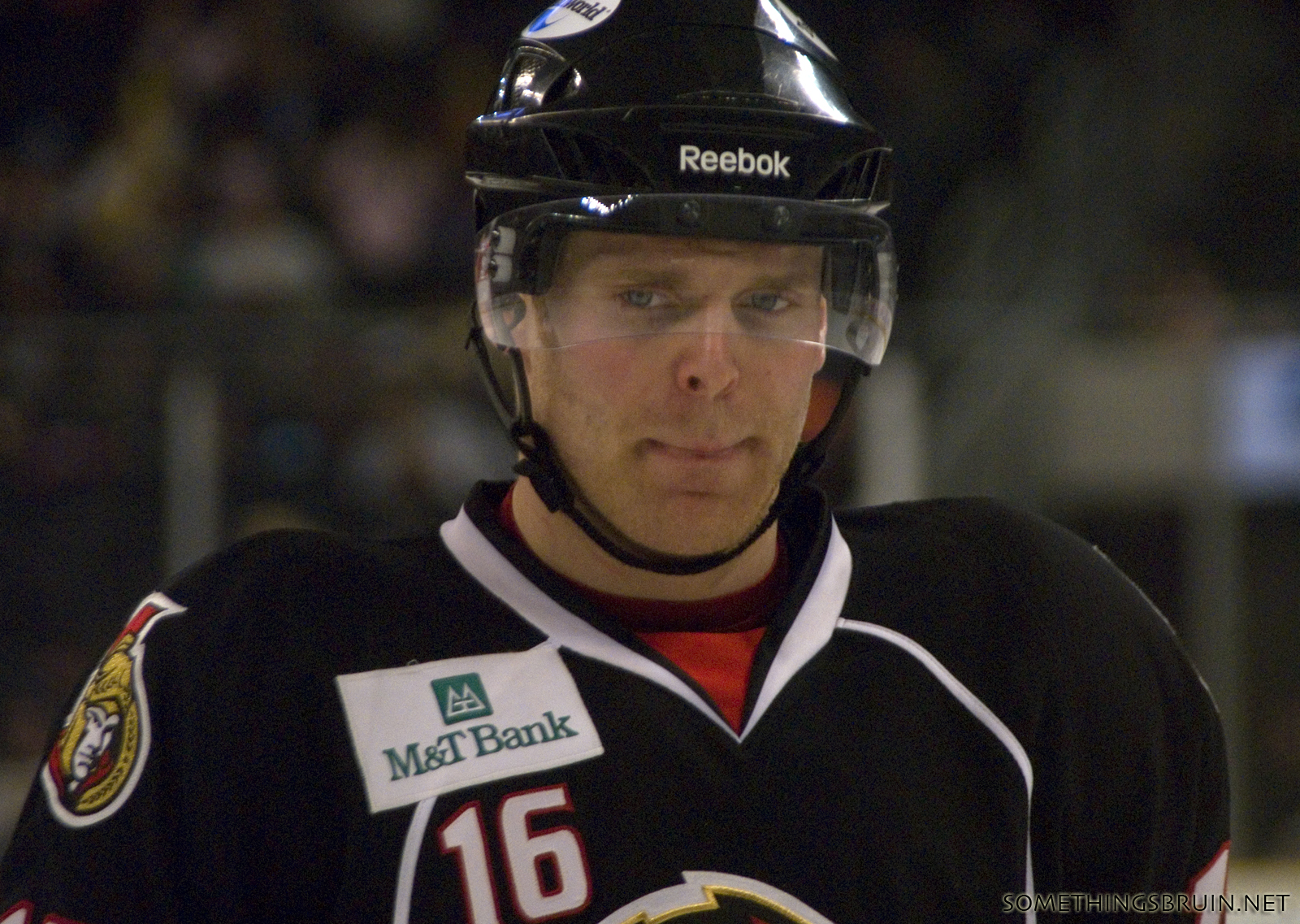
- Bass with the Binghamton Senators
- Born: January 7, 1987 (age 39) Owen Sound, Ontario, Canada
- Height: 6 ft 0 in (183 cm)
- Weight: 216 lb (98 kg; 15 st 6 lb)
- Position: Centre
- Shot: Right
- Played for: Ottawa Senators; Columbus Blue Jackets; Nashville Predators
- NHL draft: 95th overall, 2005; Ottawa Senators
- Playing career: 2006–2019

Cody Bass (born January 7, 1987) is a Canadian former professional ice hockey player. He played for the Ottawa Senators, Columbus Blue Jackets and Nashville Predators in the National Hockey League (NHL). The Senators drafted Bass in the fourth round, 95th overall during the 2005 NHL entry draft.

== Playing career ==
Born in Owen Sound, Ontario, Bass grew up in Guelph, Ontario, playing much of his minor hockey with the Guelph Jr. Storm of the OMHA's South Central AAA League. After his Bantam season, Bass played for the Guelph Dominators Jr.B. team of the OHA in the 2002–03 season and was the 1st round choice (5th overall) selection of the OHL's Mississauga Ice Dogs in 2003.

Prior to joining the Senators organization, Bass played major junior with the Saginaw Spirit and Mississauga IceDogs of the OHL. In 247 career OHL games, Bass tallied 124 points (40 goals and 84 assists) and collected 371 PIM.

Bass has also represented Canada internationally, winning a gold medal with Team Canada at the 2004 U-18 Junior World Cup. He also played on Canada's U-18 silver medal team at the 2005 U-18 Junior World Cup in Břeclav, Czech Republic.

Bass was eligible to be drafted in the 2005 NHL entry draft which was held in Ottawa, and was chosen in the fourth round, 95th overall, by the hometown Ottawa Senators. The Senators had earlier acquired the selection from the Minnesota Wild in exchange for Todd White. Bass joined the Binghamton Senators and scored his first professional goal with Binghamton, on April 14, 2006, at Norfolk.

Bass played his first game in the NHL with Ottawa against the Atlanta Thrashers on December 15, 2007, and scored his first NHL goal against the Buffalo Sabres on January 4, 2008. Because he was not on the Binghamton Senators official "clear day" roster, he was ineligible to return to the AHL during the 2007–08 season and remained on the roster of the Ottawa Senators. He played in the Stanley Cup playoffs in a first round series against the Pittsburgh Penguins. In Ottawa's 2008–09 training camp, he was one of the team's final cuts, and was assigned to Binghamton on October 7, 2008. He was recalled to Ottawa on November 19, 2008, only to sustain a season-ending injury shortly thereafter.

Bass spent the entire 2009–10 season in Binghamton, registering 11 points in 57 games. Bass played another season with Binghamton, and was a member of the Calder Cup-winning squad. Bass then signed as a free agent with the Columbus Blue Jackets. He split the season between Columbus and Springfield, suffering a serious injury while with Springfield on December 19, 2011. Columbus re-signed Bass to a one-year contract in April 2012.

Cody Bass played only one game in the 2013–14 season with the Blue Jackets against the Buffalo Sabres, playing a limited 2:43 of ice-time and 5 PIMS from a fight with Zenon Konopka.

On July 1, 2014, Bass signed a one-year, two-way contract with the Chicago Blackhawks. On September 30, 2014, he was assigned to the Rockford IceHogs, the team's AHL affiliate. In the 2014–15 season, Bass appeared in 61 games with the IceHogs to contribute with 14 points and 165 penalty minutes.

On July 4, 2015, having left the Blackhawks as a free agent, Bass signed a one-year, two-way contract with the Nashville Predators.

Bass left the Predators' organization after three seasons. On September 12, 2018, Bass agreed to attend the Colorado Avalanche training camp on a professional tryout. After attending camp and participating in the pre-season, the Avalanche released Bass from his tryout on September 27. On September 30, 2018, he was signed to a one-year AHL contract for the 2018–19 season with the Avalanche's affiliate, the Colorado Eagles.

On August 28, 2019, Bass announced his retirement from professional hockey after 12 seasons. He accepted a position to remain within the Colorado Avalanche organization as a professional scout.

== Career statistics ==
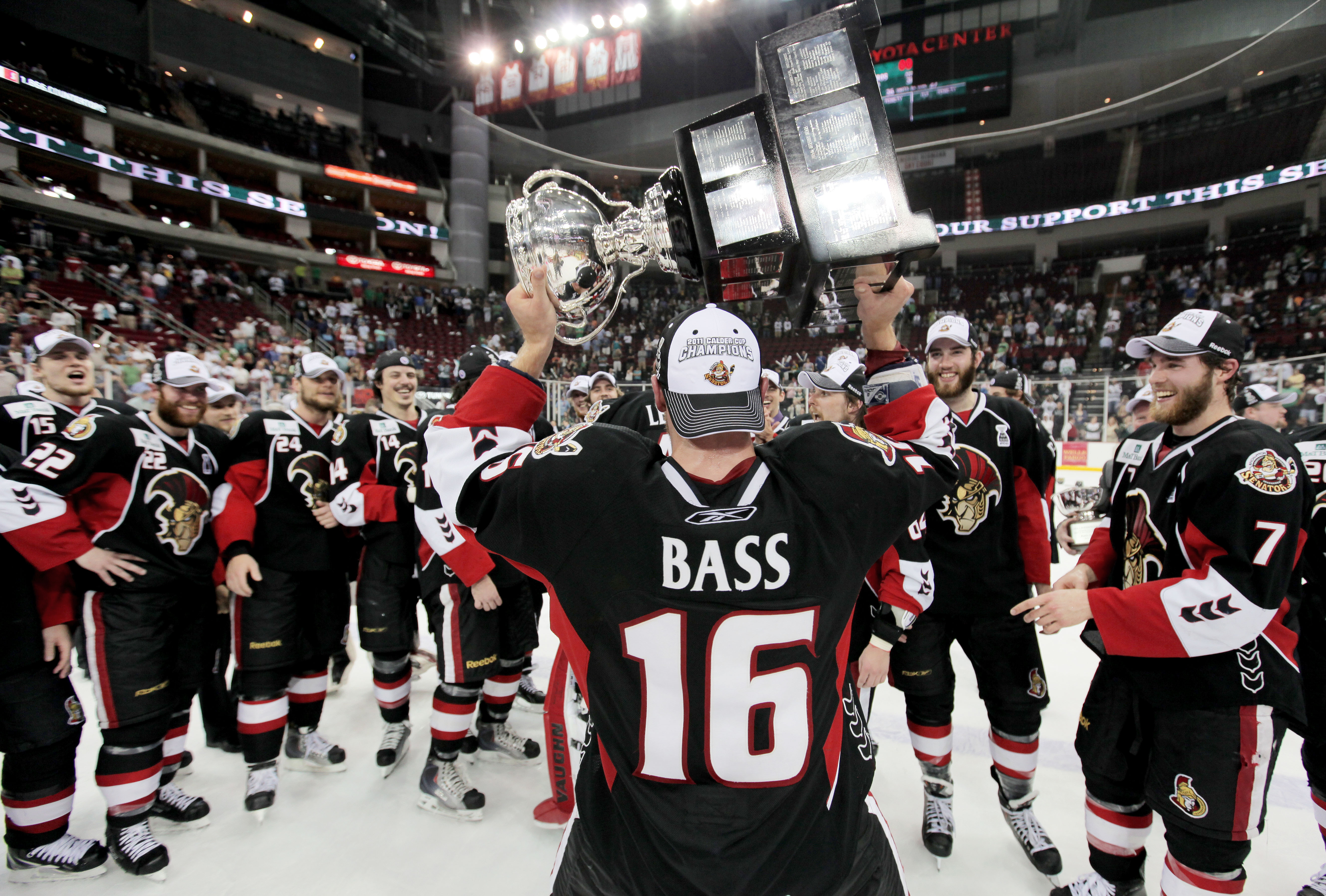
Bass lifting the Calder Cup for the Binghamton Senators on June 7, 2011.

=== Regular season and playoffs ===
			Regular season					Playoffs
Season	Team	League	GP	G	A	Pts	PIM	GP	G	A	Pts	PIM
2002–03	Guelph Dominators	MWJHL	48	3	19	22	70	6	0	0	0	16
2003–04	Mississauga IceDogs	OHL	61	3	7	10	30	24	2	3	5	21
2004–05	Mississauga IceDogs	OHL	66	11	17	28	103	5	1	1	2	8
2005–06	Mississauga IceDogs	OHL	67	16	25	41	152	—	—	—	—	—
2005–06	Binghamton Senators	AHL	9	1	0	1	2	—	—	—	—	—
2006–07	Mississauga IceDogs	OHL	23	5	11	16	37	—	—	—	—	—
2006–07	Saginaw Spirit	OHL	30	5	24	29	49	6	1	2	3	10
2006–07	Binghamton Senators	AHL	5	0	2	2	9	—	—	—	—	—
2007–08	Binghamton Senators	AHL	24	3	5	8	44	—	—	—	—	—
2007–08	Ottawa Senators	NHL	21	2	2	4	19	4	1	0	1	6
2008–09	Binghamton Senators	AHL	18	1	1	2	41	—	—	—	—	—
2008–09	Ottawa Senators	NHL	12	0	0	0	15	—	—	—	—	—
2009–10	Binghamton Senators	AHL	57	5	6	11	109	—	—	—	—	—
2010–11	Binghamton Senators	AHL	58	6	9	15	111	18	2	2	4	24
2010–11	Ottawa Senators	NHL	1	0	0	0	0	—	—	—	—	—
2011–12	Springfield Falcons	AHL	23	5	6	11	43	—	—	—	—	—
2011–12	Columbus Blue Jackets	NHL	14	0	1	1	32	—	—	—	—	—
2012–13	Springfield Falcons	AHL	18	2	5	7	54	8	2	2	4	26
2013–14	Springfield Falcons	AHL	58	8	10	18	132	4	0	0	0	4
2013–14	Columbus Blue Jackets	NHL	1	0	0	0	5	—	—	—	—	—
2014–15	Rockford IceHogs	AHL	61	6	8	14	165	8	0	1	1	31
2015–16	Milwaukee Admirals	AHL	39	4	5	9	84	—	—	—	—	—
2015–16	Nashville Predators	NHL	17	0	0	0	17	6	0	0	0	2
2016–17	Nashville Predators	NHL	9	0	0	0	19	—	—	—	—	—
2016–17	Milwaukee Admirals	AHL	13	2	2	4	33	—	—	—	—	—
2017–18	Milwaukee Admirals	AHL	34	2	4	6	36	—	—	—	—	—
2018–19	Colorado Eagles	AHL	35	2	4	6	81	3	0	1	1	12
AHL totals			452	47	67	114	944	41	4	6	10	97
NHL totals			75	2	3	5	107	10	1	0	1	8

Medal record

Representing Canada

Ice hockey

IIHF U18 Championships
Silver medal – second place	2005 České Budějovice	

=== International ===
Year	Team	Event	Result	GP	G	A	Pts	PIM
2004	Canada	U18	1st place, gold medalist(s)	5	0	2	2	8
2005	Canada	WJC18	2nd place, silver medalist(s)	4	0	0	0	4
Junior totals				9	0	2	2	12

== Awards and honours ==
Award	Year
OHL
CHL Top Prospects Game	2005
AHL
Calder Cup (Binghamton Senators)	2011
Yanick Dupre Memorial Award	2011
