= Guillaume Latendresse =

Canadian ice hockey player

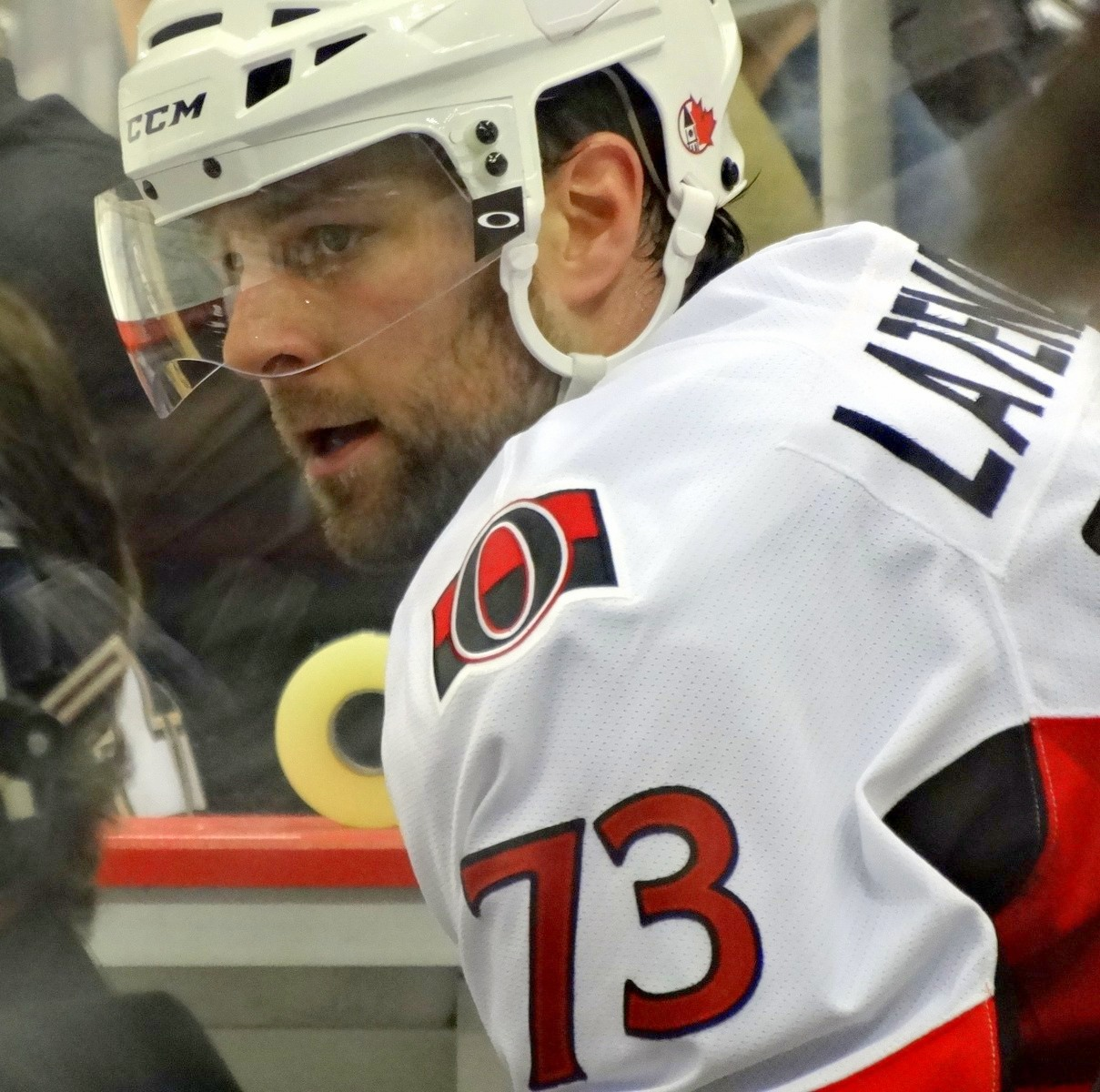
- With the Senators during the 2013 playoffs.
- Born: May 24, 1987 (age 39) Sainte-Catherine, Quebec, Canada
- Height: 6 ft 2 in (188 cm)
- Weight: 240 lb (109 kg; 17 st 2 lb)
- Position: Right wing
- Shot: Left
- Played for: Montreal Canadiens; Minnesota Wild; Ottawa Senators; ZSC Lions
- NHL draft: 45th overall, 2005; Montreal Canadiens
- Playing career: 2006–2013

Guillaume Latendresse (born May 24, 1987) is a Canadian former professional ice hockey player. He was selected in the second round, 45th overall, by the Montreal Canadiens in the 2005 NHL entry draft. Lantendresse also played for the Minnesota Wild and Ottawa Senators.

== Playing career ==
As a youth, Latendresse played in the 2001 Quebec International Pee-Wee Hockey Tournament with the minor ice hockey team from Collège Charles-Lemoyne in Sainte-Catherine, Quebec.

=== Junior ===
Latendresse was selected by the Drummondville Voltigeurs second overall in the 2003 Quebec Major Junior Hockey League (QMJHL) Entry Draft, just after Sidney Crosby, who was taken first overall by the Rimouski Océanic. Latendresse played two seasons with the Voltigeurs before being selected by the Montreal Canadiens in the second round of the 2005 NHL entry draft. He attended the Canadiens' training camp in 2005, but was ultimately returned to the Voltigeurs for another season of development. He was a member of the Canadian World Junior Team that won the gold medal in 2006.

On January 7, 2017, Latendresse's number 22 was retired by the Voltigeurs as part of their 35th season celebrations. He scored 96 goals, 114 assists and 210 points in 169 games with the Voltigeurs. His linemate Derick Brassard had his number 61 retired earlier the same season.

=== Professional ===
Latendresse's successful training camp in 2006 prompted then-Canadiens head coach Guy Carbonneau to give the 19-year-old a roster spot on the team; general manager Bob Gainey made Carbonneau's decision official by signing Latendresse to a three-year deal worth US$850,000 per year, the NHL rookie maximum.

Latendresse was given the number 84 jersey prior to the start of his first season. While unaware of its significance, he became the first player in NHL history to ever wear the number 84 during a regular season game, which was the last number (from 1–99) to have never been worn by a player.

During his rookie NHL season, Latendresse moved up to the first line after forward Chris Higgins suffered an ankle injury. On November 7, 2006, during his first game on the Canadiens' top line, Latendresse tapped in a rebound past goaltender Dwayne Roloson to record his first career NHL goal against the Edmonton Oilers, 1:04 into the third period. At a press conference after that game, Latendresse was asked about the comments of former Canadiens goaltender and Hall of Famer Patrick Roy. Just a few weeks earlier, Roy had said he thinks the only reason 19-year-old rookie Latendresse remained with the Canadiens is that he is a francophone, suggesting if his surname was "Smith" or "Brown," he would have been back in the QMJHL. Latendresse talked briefly about it: "It's me who's supposed to be 19, not him," said Latendresse. "I will act like a man. I'll leave it to him to act like a child. I don't know why he's acting like that. I've never spoken to him. He should be delighted by the success of young Québecers in the NHL instead of making stupid comments."

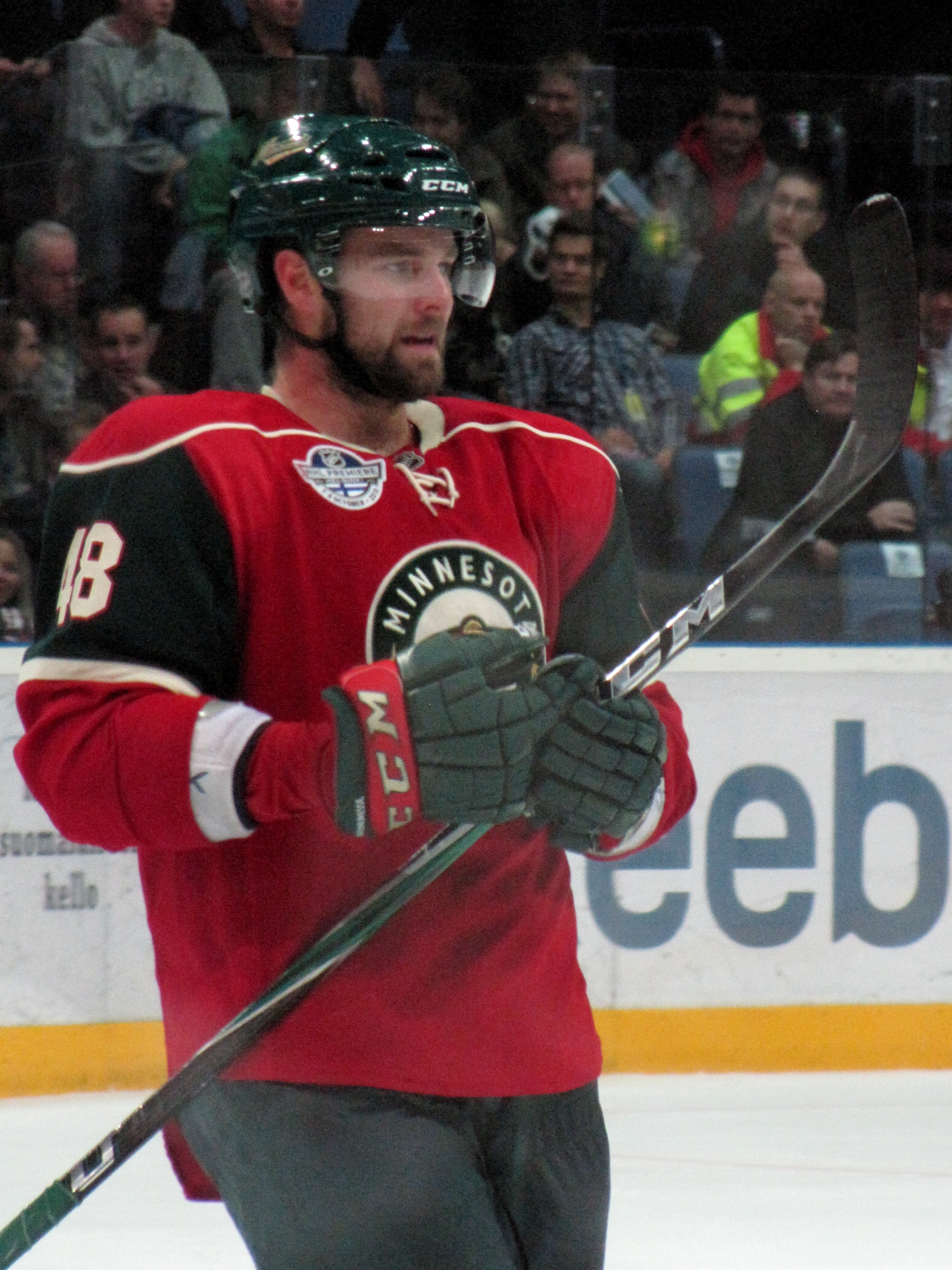
Latendresse during his time with the Wild.

Midway through his fourth season in Montreal, Latendresse was traded to the Minnesota Wild on November 23, 2009, for forward Benoît Pouliot. In his first 20 games with the Wild, Latendresse scored ten goals; he had scored only two in his previous 23 games in Montreal.

On October 7, 2010, Latendresse scored the first goal of the 2010–11 season, just 3:33 into the first period, on Carolina Hurricanes goaltender Cam Ward in Helsinki, Finland. Latendresse's 2010–11 season was plagued with injuries; he required surgery to repair a sports hernia and a torn labrum in his hip, and he ultimately was forced to miss all but 11 games. At the end of the season, Wild Owner Craig Leipold accused Latendresse of not taking his off-season training regimen seriously, and stated that Latendresse was expected to show up for the beginning of the 2011–12 season in top shape. However, Latendresse played just 16 games for the Wild in 2011–12, suffering from a hip injury and recurring concussion problems.

On July 1, 2012, Latendresse signed a one-year contract as a free agent with the Ottawa Senators.

Latendresse was among a small group of Senators players who had planned on attending the 2013 Boston Marathon. Latendresse and the other players had originally intended to be at the marathon's finish line during the time at which bombs exploded, killing three and injuring several spectators and runners. Scratches for that night's game against the Boston Bruins, the players changed their plans at the last minute and elected to return to their hotel for a nap instead. "We probably would have been in that exact same spot [of the explosion], within a block or so," Latendresse's teammate Jared Cowen said.

Latendresse's time with the Senators was short, as he played in only 27 games, missing the remainder of the season either with injuries or as a healthy scratch. He was later informed by Senators general manager Bryan Murray on May 29, 2013, that he was being released by the team, allowing him to become an unrestricted free agent.

After an unsuccessful try-out with the Phoenix Coyotes, Latendresse signed a European contract with the ZSC Lions of the National League A in Switzerland. In the 2013–14 season, he appeared in only 12 games, scoring 6 points, before opting to end his professional career.

On April 16, 2014, it was announced that Latendresse would coach at the Quebec Midget AAA level with the Collège Charles-Lemoyne Riverains.

== Career statistics ==
=== Regular season and playoffs ===
			Regular season					Playoffs
Season	Team	League	GP	G	A	Pts	PIM	GP	G	A	Pts	PIM
2001–02	Collège Charles–Lemoyne	QMAAA	42	23	25	48	92	—	—	—	—	—
2002–03	Collège Charles–Lemoyne	QMAAA	41	23	31	54	50	—	—	—	—	—
2003–04	Drummondville Voltigeurs	QMJHL	53	24	25	49	66	—	—	—	—	—
2004–05	Drummondville Voltigeurs	QMJHL	65	29	49	78	76	6	6	4	10	7
2005–06	Drummondville Voltigeurs	QMJHL	51	43	40	83	105	5	3	2	5	8
2006–07	Montreal Canadiens	NHL	80	16	13	29	47	—	—	—	—	—
2007–08	Montreal Canadiens	NHL	73	16	11	27	41	8	0	1	1	19
2008–09	Montreal Canadiens	NHL	56	14	12	26	45	4	0	0	0	12
2009–10	Montreal Canadiens	NHL	23	2	1	3	4	—	—	—	—	—
2009–10	Minnesota Wild	NHL	55	25	12	37	12	—	—	—	—	—
2010–11	Minnesota Wild	NHL	11	3	3	6	8	—	—	—	—	—
2011–12	Minnesota Wild	NHL	16	5	4	9	20	—	—	—	—	—
2012–13	Ottawa Senators	NHL	27	6	4	10	8	3	1	1	2	6
2013–14	ZSC Lions	NLA	12	3	3	6	20	—	—	—	—	—
NHL totals			341	87	60	147	185	15	1	2	3	37

Medal record

Representing Canada

Ice hockey

World Junior Championships
Gold medal – first place	2006 Vancouver	

IIHF U18 Championships
Silver medal – second place	2005 České Budějovice	

=== International ===
Year	Team	Event	Result	GP	G	A	Pts	PIM
2004	Canada Quebec	U17	3rd place, bronze medalist(s)	6	4	6	10	8
2005	Canada	WJC18	2nd place, silver medalist(s)	6	2	3	5	4
2006	Canada	WJC	1st place, gold medalist(s)	6	0	0	0	0
Junior totals				12	2	3	5	4
