= Risto Korhonen =

Finnish ice hockey player (born 1986)

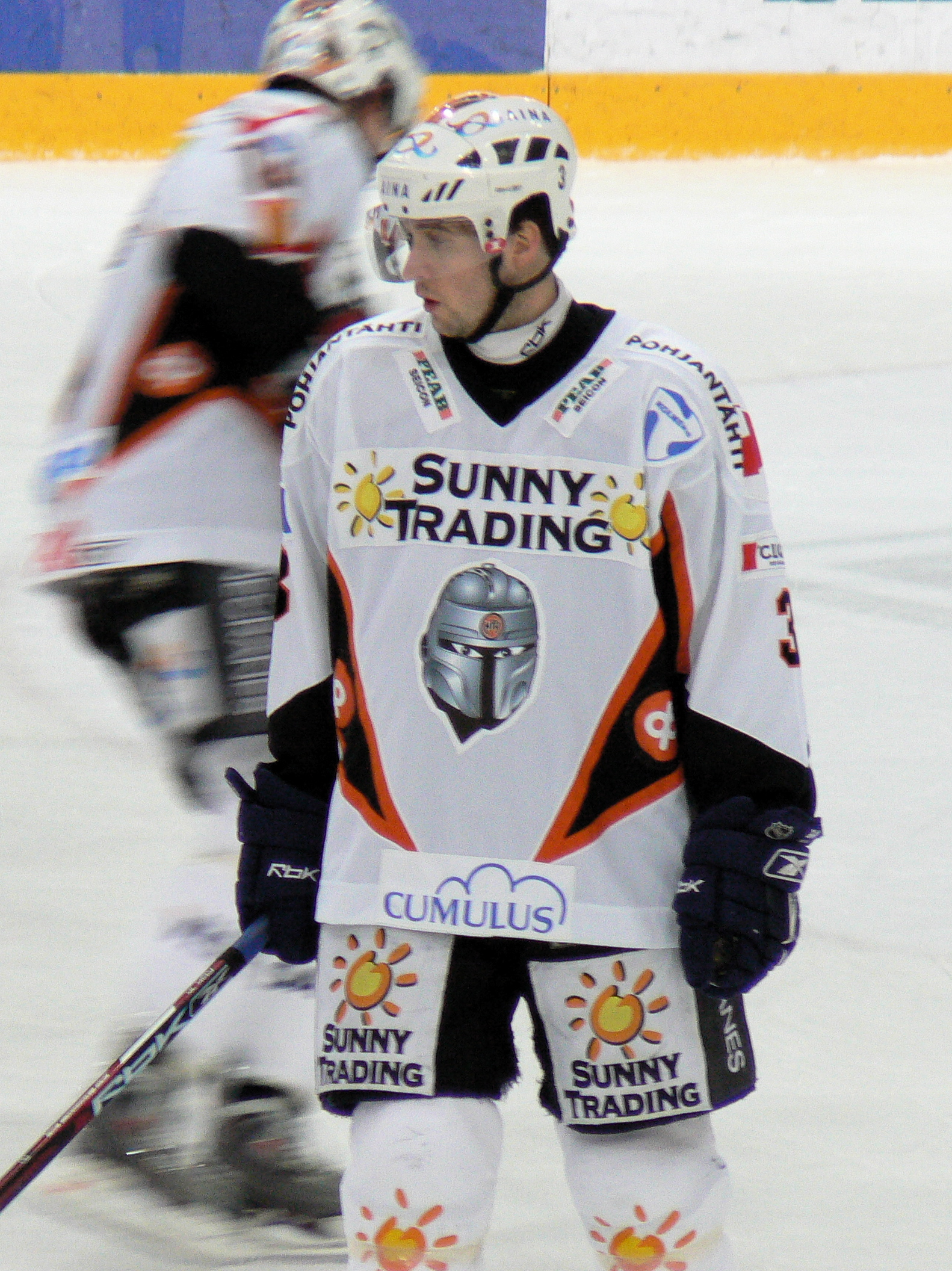
- Born: 27 November 1986 (age 39) Sotkamo, Finland
- Height: 6 ft 3 in (191 cm)
- Weight: 201 lb (91 kg; 14 st 5 lb)
- Position: Defenceman
- Shot: Left
- Played for: HPK
- NHL draft: 159th overall, 2005; Carolina Hurricanes
- Playing career: 2005–2009

Risto Korhonen (born 27 November 1986) is a Finnish former professional ice hockey defenceman who played for HPK of the Finnish Liiga. He was selected in the fifth round, 159th overall, by the Carolina Hurricanes in the 2005 NHL entry draft.
