= Christofer Löfberg =

Swedish ice hockey player (born 1986)

- Born: October 11, 1986 (age 39) Stockholm, Sweden
- Height: 6 ft 2 in (188 cm)
- Weight: 200 lb (91 kg; 14 st 4 lb)
- Position: Centre
- Shot: Right
- Played for: Djurgårdens IF; Rögle BK; Odense Bulldogs; Scorpions de Mulhouse
- NHL draft: 80th overall, 2005; Detroit Red Wings
- Playing career: 2005–2013

Christofer Löfberg (born October 11, 1986 in Stockholm, Sweden) is a former professional Swedish ice hockey player. Löfberg was drafted 80th overall by the Detroit Red Wings in the 2005 NHL entry draft.

== Career statistics ==
			Regular season					Playoffs
Season	Team	League	GP	G	A	Pts	PIM	GP	G	A	Pts	PIM
2001–02	AIK	J18 Allsv	1	2	0	2	2	—	—	—	—	—
2002–03	AIK	J18 Allsv	13	8	4	12	18	—	—	—	—	—
2002–03	AIK	J20	3	1	0	1	0	4	0	0	0	0
2003–04	Huddinge IK	J20	36	3	12	15	20	2	0	0	0	2
2004–05	Djurgårdens IF	J20	30	21	13	34	49	—	—	—	—	—
2004–05	Djurgårdens IF	SEL	1	0	0	0	0	—	—	—	—	—
2005–06	Djurgårdens IF	J20	11	7	6	13	10	4	2	1	3	4
2005–06	Djurgårdens IF	SEL	43	2	0	2	24	—	—	—	—	—
2006–07	Djurgårdens IF	J20	5	2	1	3	2	—	—	—	—	—
2006–07	Djurgårdens IF	SEL	34	0	4	4	6	—	—	—	—	—
2006–07	Huddinge IK	Allsv	12	2	1	3	14	—	—	—	—	—
2007–08	Rögle BK	Allsv	42	22	12	34	40	10	3	1	4	10
2008–09	Rögle BK	SEL	15	2	0	2	6	—	—	—	—	—
2008–09	AIK	Allsv	29	5	5	10	6	10	0	1	1	8
2009–10	IK Oskarshamn	Allsv	38	5	2	7	65	10	1	5	6	0
2010–11	Odense Bulldogs	DEN	33	7	9	16	46	—	—	—	—	—
2011–12	Dornbirner EC	AUT.2	32	18	26	44	51	8	2	6	8	6
2012–13	Scorpions de Mulhouse	FRA	24	7	9	16	34	—	—	—	—	—
SEL totals			78	2	4	6	30	—	—	—	—	—
Allsv totals			121	34	20	54	125	30	4	7	11	18
