= Dmitri Megalinsky =

Russian ice hockey player

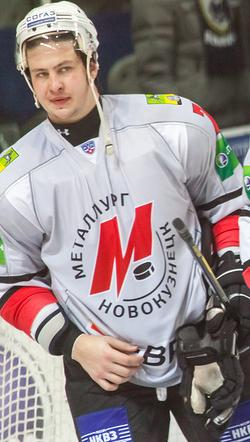
- Born: April 15, 1985 (age 41) Perm, Russian SFSR
- Height: 6 ft 2 in (188 cm)
- Weight: 212 lb (96 kg; 15 st 2 lb)
- Position: Defence
- Shot: Left
- Played for: Lokomotiv Yaroslavl; Vityaz Chekhov; Metallurg Novokuznetsk; Spartak Moscow; Avtomobilist Yekaterinburg; Severstal Cherepovets; TUTO Hockey; Kunlun Red Star; Arlan Kokshetau
- NHL draft: 186th overall, 2005; Ottawa Senators
- Playing career: 2003–2021

Dmitri Aleksandrovich Megalinsky (Russian: Дми́трий Алекса́ндрович Мегали́нский; sometimes spelled Dmitry; born April 15, 1985) is a Russian ice hockey coach and former professional ice hockey defenceman who is currently an assistant coach for Metallurg Novokuznetsk of the Supreme Hockey League (VHL). He previously played with Severstal Cherepovets of the Kontinental Hockey League (KHL). He was selected by Ottawa Senators in the 6th round (186th overall) of the 2005 NHL entry draft.

== Career statistics ==
=== Regular season and playoffs ===
| | | | Regular season | | | | | Playoffs |
| Season | Team | League | GP | G | A | Pts | PIM | GP | G | A | Pts | PIM |
|---|---|---|---|---|---|---|---|---|---|---|---|---|
| 2000–01 | Molot–2 Perm | RUS.3 | 15 | 1 | 0 | 1 | 4 | — | — | — | — | — |
| 2001–02 | Molot–2 Perm | RUS.3 | 23 | 1 | 2 | 3 | 42 | — | — | — | — | — |
| 2002–03 | Lokomotiv–2 Yaroslavl | RUS.3 | 26 | 0 | 2 | 2 | 67 | — | — | — | — | — |
| 2003–04 | Lokomotiv Yaroslavl | RSL | 1 | 0 | 0 | 0 | 0 | — | — | — | — | — |
| 2003–04 | Lokomotiv–2 Yaroslavl | RUS.3 | 16 | 0 | 5 | 5 | 24 | — | — | — | — | — |
| 2003–04 | HK Voronezh | RUS.2 | 42 | 4 | 8 | 12 | 159 | — | — | — | — | — |
| 2004–05 | Lokomotiv Yaroslavl | RSL | 1 | 0 | 0 | 0 | 2 | — | — | — | — | — |
| 2004–05 | Lokomotiv–2 Yaroslavl | RUS.3 | 38 | 8 | 14 | 22 | 88 | — | — | — | — | — |
| 2005–06 | Lokomotiv Yaroslavl | RSL | 20 | 0 | 1 | 1 | 8 | 8 | 0 | 0 | 0 | 6 |
| 2005–06 | Lokomotiv–2 Yaroslavl | RUS.3 | 12 | 4 | 10 | 14 | 6 | — | — | — | — | — |
| 2006–07 | Khimik Voskresensk | RUS.2 | 32 | 4 | 7 | 11 | 36 | 7 | 0 | 1 | 1 | 16 |
| 2006–07 | Khimik–2 Voskresensk | RUS.3 | 6 | 2 | 1 | 3 | 14 | — | — | — | — | — |
| 2007–08 | HC Vityaz | RSL | 25 | 2 | 7 | 9 | 20 | — | — | — | — | — |
| 2007–08 | HC–2 Vityaz | RUS.3 | 5 | 0 | 2 | 2 | 6 | — | — | — | — | — |
| 2008–09 | HC Vityaz | KHL | 52 | 2 | 5 | 7 | 72 | — | — | — | — | — |
| 2009–10 | HC Vityaz | KHL | 52 | 4 | 16 | 20 | 98 | — | — | — | — | — |
| 2010–11 | HC Vityaz | KHL | 27 | 0 | 3 | 3 | 18 | — | — | — | — | — |
| 2011–12 | Metallurg Novokuznetsk | KHL | 46 | 2 | 11 | 13 | 34 | — | — | — | — | — |
| 2012–13 | Metallurg Novokuznetsk | KHL | 38 | 5 | 9 | 14 | 18 | — | — | — | — | — |
| 2013–14 | Spartak Moscow | KHL | 19 | 0 | 0 | 0 | 6 | — | — | — | — | — |
| 2013–14 | Avtomobilist Yekaterinburg | KHL | 28 | 4 | 8 | 12 | 22 | 4 | 1 | 0 | 1 | 0 |
| 2014–15 | Avtomobilist Yekaterinburg | KHL | 40 | 3 | 6 | 9 | 22 | 5 | 0 | 1 | 1 | 4 |
| 2015–16 | Avtomobilist Yekaterinburg | KHL | 45 | 5 | 11 | 16 | 18 | 6 | 0 | 1 | 1 | 2 |
| 2016–17 | Avtomobilist Yekaterinburg | KHL | 52 | 5 | 4 | 9 | 63 | — | — | — | — | — |
| 2017–18 | Avtomobilist Yekaterinburg | KHL | 26 | 1 | 5 | 6 | 18 | 4 | 0 | 1 | 1 | 0 |
| 2018–19 | Metallurg Novokuznetsk | VHL | 34 | 1 | 10 | 11 | 12 | — | — | — | — | — |
| 2018–19 | Severstal Cherepovets | KHL | 10 | 1 | 1 | 2 | 31 | — | — | — | — | — |
| 2019–20 | TUTO Hockey | Mestis | 4 | 0 | 0 | 0 | 0 | — | — | — | — | — |
| 2020–21 | Kunlun Red Star | KHL | 5 | 0 | 1 | 1 | 8 | — | — | — | — | — |
| 2020–21 | Arlan Kokshetau | KAZ | 6 | 1 | 0 | 1 | 6 | — | — | — | — | — |
| RSL totals | | | 47 | 2 | 8 | 10 | 30 | 8 | 0 | 0 | 0 | 6 |
| KHL totals | | | 440 | 32 | 80 | 112 | 428 | 19 | 1 | 3 | 4 | 6 |

=== International ===
| Year | Team | Event | GP | G | A | Pts | PIM |
|---|---|---|---|---|---|---|---|
| 2002 | Russia | U17 |
| 2005 | Russia | WJC | 6 | 0 | 1 | 1 | 4 |
| Junior totals | | | 6 | 0 | 1 | 1 | 4 |
