= Jean-Philippe Levasseur =

Canadian ice hockey player (born 1987)

- Born: January 15, 1987 (age 39) Victoriaville, Quebec, Canada
- Height: 6 ft 0 in (183 cm)
- Weight: 183 lb (83 kg; 13 st 1 lb)
- Position: Goaltender
- Shot: Right
- Played for: Portland Pirates; Iowa Chops; Springfield Falcons; Syracuse Crunch; SG Cortina
- NHL draft: 197th overall, 2005; Mighty Ducks of Anaheim
- Playing career: 2007–2019

Jean-Philippe Levasseur (born January 15, 1987) is a Canadian former professional ice hockey goaltender.

== Career ==
Levasseur was selected by the Mighty Ducks of Anaheim in the seventh round (197th overall) of the 2005 NHL entry draft. During the 2010–11 AHL season he played for the Syracuse Crunch. He ended his career as a member of SG Cortina in Serie A, the top tier of professional ice hockey in Italy.

== Awards and honours ==
- U17 WHC Bronze Medal (2003–04)
