= Gord Baldwin =

Canadian ice hockey player

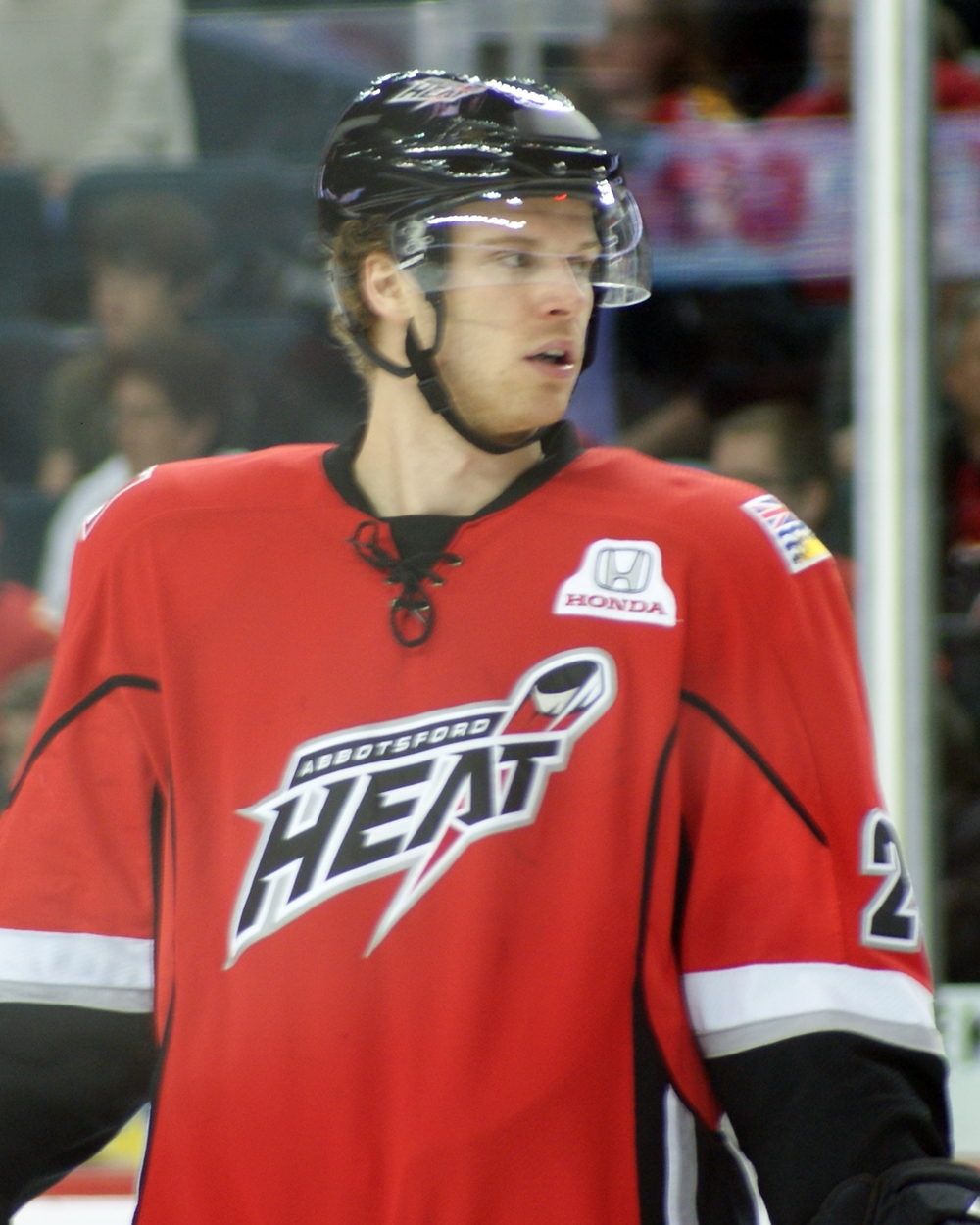
- Born: March 1, 1987 (age 39) Winnipeg, Manitoba, Canada
- Height: 6 ft 5 in (196 cm)
- Weight: 205 lb (93 kg; 14 st 9 lb)
- Position: Defenceman
- Shot: Left
- Played for: Quad City Flames; Abbotsford Heat; BK Mladá Boleslav; Texas Stars; Sheffield Steelers
- NHL draft: 69th overall, 2005; Calgary Flames
- Playing career: 2007–2015

Gordon Baldwin (born March 1, 1987) is a Canadian former professional ice hockey player who last played for the Sheffield Steelers of the Elite Ice Hockey League (EIHL).

== Playing career ==
Baldwin had previously played for the Abbotsford Heat of the American Hockey League (AHL) as a prospect for the Calgary Flames of the National Hockey League (NHL). He was selected by the Flames in the third-round, 69th overall, in the 2005 NHL entry draft. He became a free agent following the 2010–11 season, and signed with BK Mladá Boleslav on July 25, 2011.

Baldwin returned to North America for the 2012–13 season, signing an ECHL contract with the Idaho Steelheads. He later signed a professional try-out with the affiliate, the Texas Stars of the AHL on December 28, 2012.

On August 1, 2013, Baldwin signed a two-year contract with the United Kingdom club, the Sheffield Steelers of the EIHL. Upon the conclusion of his second season with the Steelers, Baldwin announced the end of his professional playing career, accepting an assistant coaching role with former ECHL club, the Idaho Steelheads, on September 24, 2015.

His younger brother, Corbin Baldwin is also a professional hockey defenceman who played in the AHL (Iowa Wild) and EIHL (Guildford Flames).

== Career statistics ==
			Regular season					Playoffs
Season	Team	League	GP	G	A	Pts	PIM	GP	G	A	Pts	PIM
2003–04	Winnipeg Thrashers AAA	MMHL	39	5	16	21	66	—	—	—	—	—
2003–04	Selkirk Steelers	MJHL	2	0	0	0	0	—	—	—	—	—
2004–05	Medicine Hat Tigers	WHL	66	3	8	11	73	13	2	2	4	8
2005–06	Medicine Hat Tigers	WHL	71	4	20	24	119	13	0	9	9	22
2006–07	Medicine Hat Tigers	WHL	53	7	19	26	70	23	2	6	8	32
2007–08	Quad City Flames	AHL	37	0	5	5	26	—	—	—	—	—
2007–08	Las Vegas Wranglers	ECHL	12	0	1	1	9	—	—	—	—	—
2008–09	Quad City Flames	AHL	55	2	4	6	39	—	—	—	—	—
2008–09	Las Vegas Wranglers	ECHL	3	0	1	1	23	—	—	—	—	—
2009–10	Abbotsford Heat	AHL	67	4	20	24	84	12	1	1	2	18
2010–11	Abbotsford Heat	AHL	75	2	11	13	58	—	—	—	—	—
2011–12	BK Mladá Boleslav	ELH	43	0	1	1	42	—	—	—	—	—
2012–13	Idaho Steelheads	ECHL	26	3	11	14	39	13	0	3	3	24
2012–13	Texas Stars	AHL	29	0	5	5	33	—	—	—	—	—
2013–14	Sheffield Steelers	EIHL	45	4	13	17	98	4	0	2	2	8
2014–15	Sheffield Steelers	EIHL	43	4	14	18	25	—	—	—	—	—
AHL totals			263	8	45	53	240	12	1	1	2	18
