= Viktor Dovgan =

Russian ice hockey player (born 1987)

- Born: February 27, 1987 (age 39) Moscow, Russia
- Height: 6 ft 2 in (188 cm)
- Weight: 202 lb (92 kg; 14 st 6 lb)
- Position: Defence
- Shot: Left
- Played for: Hershey Bears; CSKA Moscow; Avtomobilist Yekaterinburg
- NHL draft: 209th overall, 2005; Washington Capitals
- Playing career: 2005–2019

Viktor Dovgan (born February 27, 1987) is a Russian former professional ice hockey defenceman. He last played with Beibarys Atyrau in the Kazakhstan Hockey Championship (KHC). He was originally selected in the seventh round, 209th overall, by the Washington Capitals in the 2005 NHL entry draft.

He formerly played with HC Sarov in the Supreme Hockey League (VHL) under contract from Avtomobilist Yekaterinburg of the Kontinental Hockey League (KHL).

== Career statistics ==
			Regular season					Playoffs
Season	Team	League	GP	G	A	Pts	PIM	GP	G	A	Pts	PIM
2002–03	CSKA–2 Moscow	RUS.3	2	0	1	1	2	—	—	—	—	—
2003–04	CSKA–2 Moscow	RUS.3	12	0	0	0	8	—	—	—	—	—
2004–05	CSKA–2 Moscow	RUS.3	54	1	4	5	77	—	—	—	—	—
2005–06	CSKA–2 Moscow	RUS.3	44	9	7	16	143	—	—	—	—	—
2005–06	CSK VVS Samara	RUS.2	8	1	2	3	20	—	—	—	—	—
2006–07	Hershey Bears	AHL	1	0	0	0	2	—	—	—	—	—
2006–07	South Carolina Stingrays	ECHL	56	5	6	11	95	—	—	—	—	—
2007–08	CSKA Moscow	RSL	16	0	0	0	10	—	—	—	—	—
2007–08	CSKA–2 Moscow	RUS.3	16	3	8	11	52	—	—	—	—	—
2008–09	Hershey Bears	AHL	2	0	0	0	2	—	—	—	—	—
2008–09	South Carolina Stingrays	ECHL	53	2	10	12	52	—	—	—	—	—
2009–10	Zauralie Kurgan	RUS.2	15	0	0	0	24	—	—	—	—	—
2009–10	Avtomobilist Yekaterinburg	KHL	9	0	0	0	8	—	—	—	—	—
2010–11	HC Sarov	VHL	25	1	6	7	49	—	—	—	—	—
2011–12	HC Sarov	VHL	50	3	14	17	70	—	—	—	—	—
2012–13	HC Sarov	VHL	41	2	8	10	60	5	0	0	0	4
2013–14	Buran Voronezh	VHL	48	8	9	17	64	9	2	1	3	14
2014–15	Buran Voronezh	VHL	33	2	2	4	30	4	0	0	0	0
2015–16	THK Tver	VHL	37	6	10	16	34	10	0	2	2	8
2016–17	Yuzhny Ural Orsk	VHL	33	1	4	5	30	—	—	—	—	—
2017–18	Arlan Kokshetau	KAZ	15	0	3	3	38	13	4	4	8	22
2018–19	Arlan Kokshetau	KAZ	15	0	1	1	10	—	—	—	—	—
2018–19	Beibarys Atyrau	KAZ	2	0	1	1	0	—	—	—	—	—
RSL/KHL totals			25	0	0	0	18	—	—	—	—	—
