= Ondrej Otčenáš =

Slovak ice hockey player (born 1987)

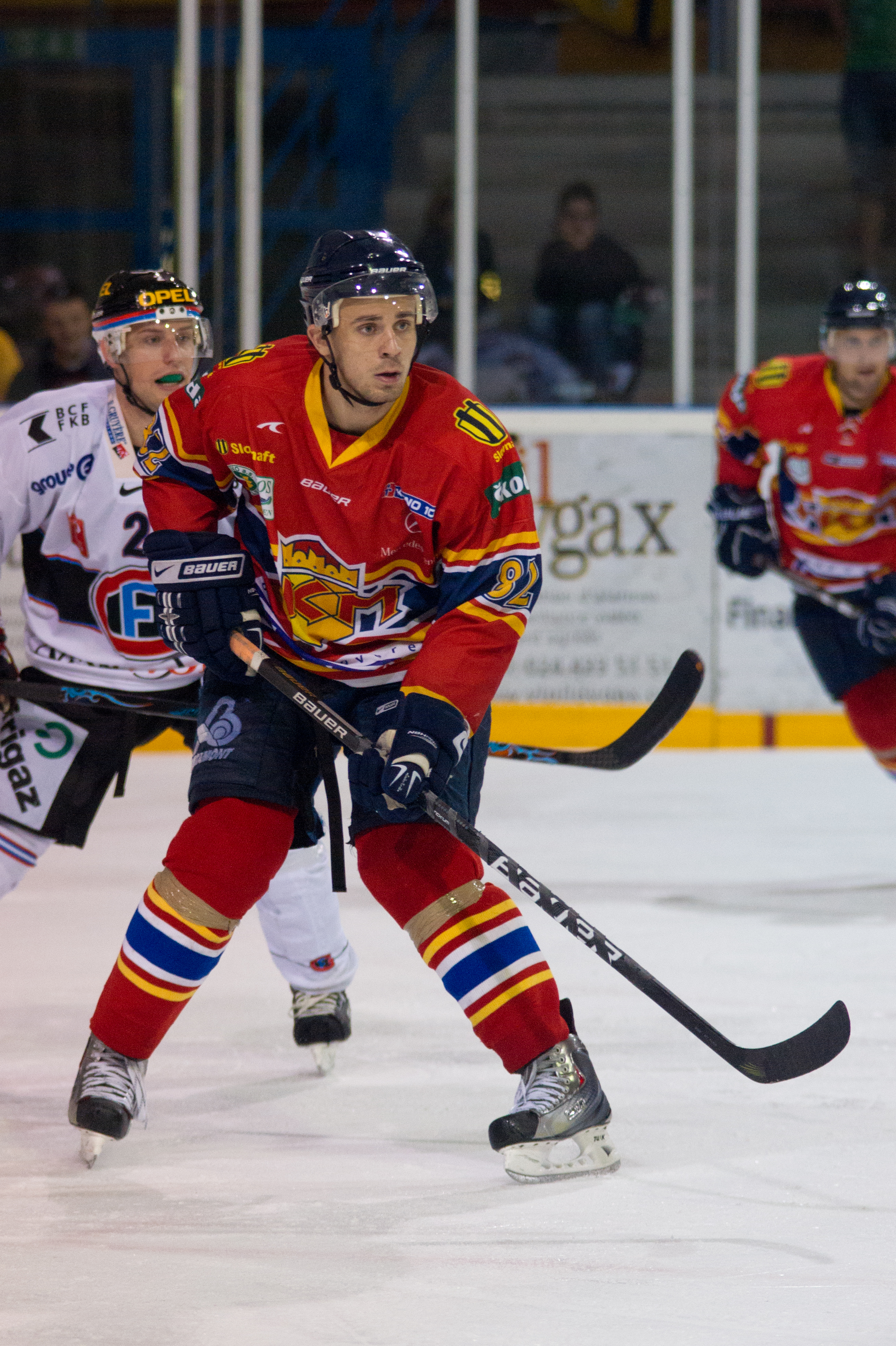
- Born: 6 March 1987 (age 39) Piešťany, Czechoslovakia
- Height: 6 ft 1 in (185 cm)
- Weight: 201 lb (91 kg; 14 st 5 lb)
- Position: Forward
- Shot: Left
- Played for: MHC Martin; HKm Zvolen; ŠHK 37 Piešťany; HK Dukla Trenčín
- NHL draft: 123rd overall, 2005; Carolina Hurricanes
- Playing career: 2007–2013

Ondrej Otčenáš (born 6 March 1987) is a Slovak former professional ice hockey player who played predominantly in the Slovak Extraliga (Slovak). He was drafted 123rd overall in the 2005 NHL entry draft by the Carolina Hurricanes.

== Career statistics ==
=== Regular season and playoffs ===
| | | | Regular season | | | | | Playoffs |
| Season | Team | League | GP | G | A | Pts | PIM | GP | G | A | Pts | PIM |
|---|---|---|---|---|---|---|---|---|---|---|---|---|
| 2003–04 | Dukla Trenčín | SVK U18 | 25 | 4 | 4 | 8 | 44 | — | — | — | — | — |
| 2003–04 | Dukla Trenčín | SVK U20 | 29 | 8 | 5 | 13 | 9 | — | — | — | — | — |
| 2005–06 | Plymouth Whalers | OHL | 50 | 5 | 6 | 11 | 28 | 1 | 0 | 0 | 0 | 0 |
| 2006–07 | HC Dukla Jihlava | CZE U20 | 15 | 1 | 3 | 4 | 46 | — | — | — | — | — |
| 2006–07 | MHC Martin | SVK | 3 | 0 | 0 | 0 | 0 | — | — | — | — | — |
| 2006–07 | HK 95 Považská Bystrica | SVK.2 | 2 | 0 | 0 | 0 | 0 | — | — | — | — | — |
| 2007–08 | ŠHK 37 Piešťany | SVK.2 | 41 | 18 | 12 | 30 | 68 | 8 | 0 | 2 | 2 | 2 |
| 2008–09 | SK Horácká Slavia Třebíč | CZE.2 | 14 | 1 | 5 | 6 | 14 | — | — | — | — | — |
| 2008–09 | VSK Technika Brno | CZE.3 | 2 | 0 | 0 | 0 | 2 | — | — | — | — | — |
| 2008–09 | ŠHK 37 Piešťany | SVK.2 | 20 | 6 | 8 | 14 | 21 | 14 | 4 | 3 | 7 | 26 |
| 2009–10 | HKm Zvolen | SVK | 46 | 5 | 12 | 17 | 32 | 5 | 0 | 2 | 2 | 2 |
| 2009–10 | HC 07 Detva | SVK.2 | 2 | 1 | 4 | 5 | 4 | — | — | — | — | — |
| 2010–11 | HKm Zvolen | SVK | 57 | 10 | 7 | 17 | 38 | 7 | 3 | 0 | 3 | 4 |
| 2011–12 | HKm Zvolen | SVK | 55 | 12 | 14 | 26 | 26 | 8 | 3 | 3 | 6 | 2 |
| 2012–13 | ŠHK 37 Piešťany | SVK | 23 | 4 | 3 | 7 | 10 | — | — | — | — | — |
| 2012–13 | Dukla Trenčín | SVK | 27 | 5 | 5 | 10 | 14 | 4 | 0 | 0 | 0 | 2 |
| 2013–14 | HC 07 Detva | SVK.2 | 9 | 3 | 10 | 13 | 16 | — | — | — | — | — |
| SVK totals | | | 211 | 36 | 41 | 77 | 120 | 24 | 6 | 5 | 11 | 10 |

=== International ===
| Year | Team | Event | GP | G | A | Pts | PIM |
|---|---|---|---|---|---|---|---|
| 2005 | Slovakia | WJC18 | 6 | 4 | 1 | 5 | 10 |
| Junior totals | | | 6 | 4 | 1 | 5 | 10 |
