= 2005 NHL entry draft =

2005 North American ice hockey draft

General information
- Date: July 30–31, 2005
- Location: Westin Hotel; Ottawa, Ontario, Canada

Overview
- 230 total selections in 7 rounds
- First selection: (Canada) Sidney Crosby (Pittsburgh Penguins)
- Hall of Famers: 1: G Carey Price

The 2005 NHL entry draft was the 43rd draft for the National Hockey League. Originally scheduled to be held on June 25, it was postponed to July 30 due to the 2004–05 NHL lockout.

Special procedures were required to determine the order of picks, because the previous season had been cancelled due to the lockout. The first overall pick was won in a lottery by the Pittsburgh Penguins, who selected Sidney Crosby.

As of 2026, the remaining active players in the NHL from this draft are Sidney Crosby and Kris Letang, both of whom were drafted by and have played their entire careers with the Pittsburgh Penguins.

== Venue ==
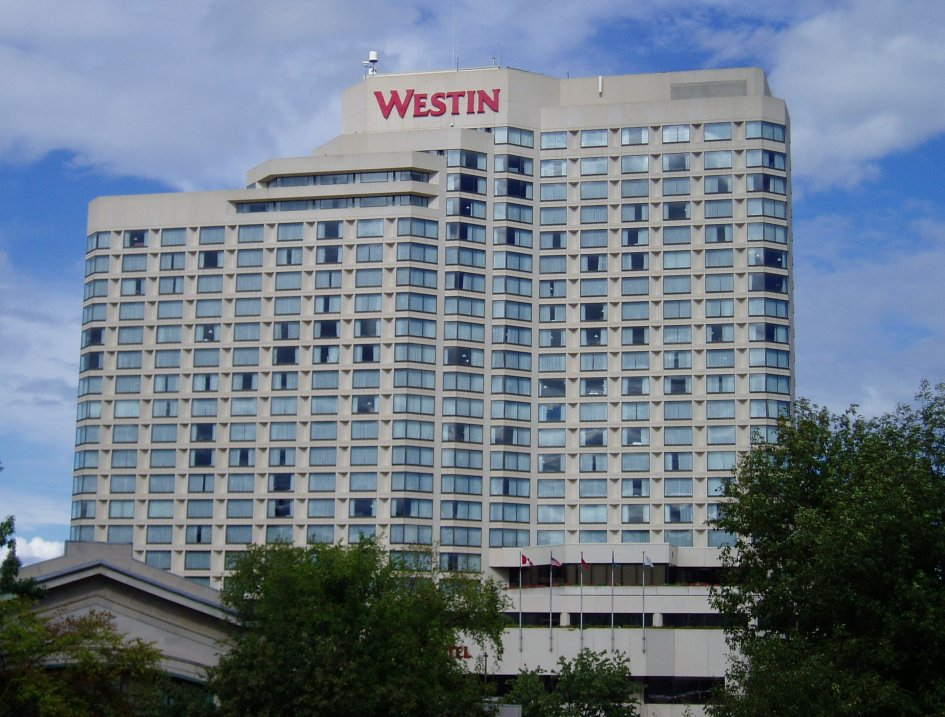
The Westin Hotel Ottawa, venue of the 2005 NHL entry draft

The draft was originally scheduled to be held on June 25, hosted by the Ottawa Senators at the Corel Centre (their home rink). However, the 2004–05 NHL lockout was still ongoing, causing the draft to be postponed. The lockout ended on July 22 with the approval of a new NHL collective bargaining agreement (CBA). The CBA set the new date of the draft as July 30. The Corel Centre was still available but could not be used on such short notice. The draft was instead held at the Westin Hotel in Ottawa, Ontario. The Senators were compensated by hosting the 2008 draft instead.

As a result of the rearrangement, the draft was not open to the public, for the first time since 1980. Nor was it possible for large numbers of drafted players to attend: only the twenty highest prospects on the NHL Central Scouting rankings were present.

== Procedures ==
The order of draft picks was usually determined by team performance in the previous season, with teams picking in the same order in each round (modified by any trading of draft picks). However, the lockout had led to the complete cancellation of the 2004–05 NHL season, so there were no final positions to base the draft order on. The new CBA modified the draft procedures accordingly.

The order of picks in the first round was determined by a weighted lottery. In the second round this order was reversed, so the team with the 30th pick would also receive the 31st pick, whilst the team with first overall pick would not pick again until the 60th pick (last pick in the second round). The order would continue alternating in each subsequent round, producing a 'snaking' order. Teams were permitted to trade their draft picks as usual, which led to some modifications to the order.

The new CBA reduced the draft length to seven rounds, compared to the nine rounds used previously. As a result, 230 players were selected.

=== Lottery ===
The lottery was held on July 22, the same day that the new CBA was approved. The top-rated prospect in this draft was Sidney Crosby, and it was widely assumed that he would be the first overall pick by whichever team won the lottery, so it became known colloquially as the 'Sidney Crosby Sweepstakes'.

Teams were weighted based on playoff appearances in the last three completed seasons (2001–02, 02-03 and 03–04), and first overall picks in the last four drafts (2001, 2002, 2003 and 2004). Three lottery balls each were assigned to teams which had not qualified for any of those playoffs and received no first overall picks in that period. Teams which had one playoff appearance or first overall pick in those years were given two lottery balls. All other teams received one lottery ball.

Three balls

- Buffalo Sabres, Columbus Blue Jackets, New York Rangers, Pittsburgh Penguins

Two balls

- Mighty Ducks of Anaheim, Atlanta Thrashers, Calgary Flames, Carolina Hurricanes, Chicago Blackhawks, Edmonton Oilers, Los Angeles Kings, Minnesota Wild, Nashville Predators, Phoenix Coyotes

One ball

- Boston Bruins, Colorado Avalanche, Dallas Stars, Detroit Red Wings, Florida Panthers, Montreal Canadiens, New Jersey Devils, New York Islanders, Ottawa Senators, Philadelphia Flyers, San Jose Sharks, St. Louis Blues, Tampa Bay Lightning, Toronto Maple Leafs, Vancouver Canucks, Washington Capitals

This produced a total of 48 lottery balls. As a result, teams with three balls had a 6.3% chance of winning the lottery, two balls 4.2%, and one ball 2.1%. The Pittsburgh Penguins won the lottery and therefore the first overall pick. Further drawing of team names was used to determine the order of the remaining picks.

== Final central scouting rankings ==
=== Skaters ===
	North American	European
1	(Canada) Sidney Crosby (C)	(Slovenia) Anze Kopitar (C)
2	(United States) Bobby Ryan (RW)	(Czech Republic) Martin Hanzal (C)
3	(United States) Jack Johnson (D)	(Czech Republic) Jakub Vojta (D)
4	(Canada) Benoit Pouliot (LW)	(Russia) Denis Istomin (RW)
5	(Canada) Gilbert Brule (C)	(Sweden) Niclas Bergfors (RW)
6	(Canada) Luc Bourdon (D)	(Russia) Vyacheslav Buravchikov (D)
7	(Canada) Kenndal McArdle (LW)	(Russia) Ilya Zubov (C)
8	(Canada) Ryan Parent (D)	(Czech Republic) Petr Kalus (RW)
9	(Canada) Marc Staal (D)	(Russia) Anton Krysanov (C)
10	(Canada) Devin Setoguchi (RW)	(Russia) Andrei Zubarev (D)

=== Goaltenders ===
	North American	European
1	(Canada) Carey Price	(Finland) Tuukka Rask
2	(Canada) Pier-Olivier Pelletier	(Czech Republic) Ondrej Pavelec
3	(Canada) Tyler Plante	(Czech Republic) Jakub Lev

== Selections by round ==
= NHL All-Star team ·	= NHL All-Star (Note: Players are identified as an All-Star if they were selected for the All-Star game at any time in their career.) ·	= NHL All-Star and NHL All-Star team ·	= Hall of Famers

=== Round one ===
#	Player	Nationality	NHL team	College/junior/club team
1	Sidney Crosby (C)	Canada	Pittsburgh Penguins	Rimouski Océanic (QMJHL)
2	Bobby Ryan (RW)	United States	Mighty Ducks of Anaheim	Owen Sound Attack (OHL)
3	Jack Johnson (D)	United States	Carolina Hurricanes	US NTDP (NAHL)
4	Benoit Pouliot (LW)	Canada	Minnesota Wild	Sudbury Wolves (OHL)
5	Carey Price (G)	Canada	Montreal Canadiens	Tri-City Americans (WHL)
6	Gilbert Brule (C)	Canada	Columbus Blue Jackets	Vancouver Giants (WHL)
7	Jack Skille (RW)	United States	Chicago Blackhawks	US NTDP (NAHL)
8	Devin Setoguchi (RW)	Canada	San Jose Sharks (from Atlanta)	Saskatoon Blades (WHL)
9	Brian Lee (D)	United States	Ottawa Senators	Moorhead High School (USHS–MN)
10	Luc Bourdon (D)	Canada	Vancouver Canucks	Val-d'Or Foreurs (QMJHL)
11	Anze Kopitar (C)	Slovenia	Los Angeles Kings	Sodertalje SK (Sweden)
12	Marc Staal (D)	Canada	New York Rangers (from San Jose via Atlanta)	Sudbury Wolves (OHL)
13	Marek Zagrapan (C)	Slovakia	Buffalo Sabres	Chicoutimi Sagueneens (QMJHL)
14	Sasha Pokulok (D)	Canada	Washington Capitals	Cornell University (ECAC)
15	Ryan O'Marra (C)	Canada	New York Islanders	Erie Otters (OHL)
16	Alex Bourret (RW)	Canada	Atlanta Thrashers (from New York Rangers)	Lewiston Maineiacs (QMJHL)
17	Martin Hanzal (C)	Czech Republic	Phoenix Coyotes	Ceske Budejovice (WHL)
18	Ryan Parent (D)	Canada	Nashville Predators	Guelph Storm (OHL)
19	Jakub Kindl (D)	Czech Republic	Detroit Red Wings	Kitchener Rangers (OHL)
20	Kenndal McArdle (LW)	Canada	Florida Panthers (from Philadelphia)	Moose Jaw Warriors (WHL)
21	Tuukka Rask (G)	Finland	Toronto Maple Leafs	Ilves (SM-liiga)
22	Matt Lashoff (D)	United States	Boston Bruins	Kitchener Rangers (OHL)
23	Niclas Bergfors (RW)	Sweden	New Jersey Devils	Sodertälje SK (Sweden)
24	T. J. Oshie (C)	United States	St. Louis Blues	Warroad High School (USHS–MN)
25	Andrew Cogliano (C)	Canada	Edmonton Oilers	St. Michael's Buzzers (OPJHL)
26	Matt Pelech (D)	Canada	Calgary Flames	Sarnia Sting (OHL)
27	Joe Finley (D)	United States	Washington Capitals (from Colorado)	Sioux Falls Stampede (USHL)
28	Matt Niskanen (D)	United States	Dallas Stars	Virginia High School (USHS–MN)
29	Steve Downie (RW)	Canada	Philadelphia Flyers (from Florida)	Windsor Spitfires (OHL)
30	Vladimir Mihalik (D)	Slovakia	Tampa Bay Lightning	HC Presov II (Slovakia)

=== Round two ===
#	Player	Nationality	NHL team	College/junior/club team
31	Brendan Mikkelson (D)	Canada	Mighty Ducks of Anaheim (from Tampa Bay)	Vancouver Giants (WHL)
32	Tyler Plante (G)	Canada	Florida Panthers	Brandon Wheat Kings (WHL)
33	James Neal (LW)	Canada	Dallas Stars	Plymouth Whalers (OHL)
34	Ryan Stoa (C)	United States	Colorado Avalanche	US NTDP (NAHL)
35	Marc-Edouard Vlasic (D)	Canada	San Jose Sharks (from Calgary)	Quebec Remparts (QMJHL)
36	Taylor Chorney (D)	United States	Edmonton Oilers	Shattuck-Saint Mary's (Midget Major AAA)
37	Scott Jackson (D)	Canada	St. Louis Blues	Seattle Thunderbirds (WHL)
38	Jeff Frazee (G)	United States	New Jersey Devils	US NTDP (NAHL)
39	Petr Kalus (C)	Czech Republic	Boston Bruins	HC Vitkovice (Czech)/Regina Pats (WHL)
40	Michael Sauer (D)	United States	New York Rangers (from Toronto)	Portland Winterhawks (WHL)
41	Ondrej Pavelec (G)	Czech Republic	Atlanta Thrashers (from Philadelphia via New York Rangers)	HC Rabat Kladno (Czech Republic)
42	Justin Abdelkader (LW)	United States	Detroit Red Wings	Cedar Rapids RoughRiders (USHL)
43	Michael Blunden (RW)	Canada	Chicago Blackhawks (from Nashville)	Erie Otters (OHL)
44	Paul Stastny (C)	United States	Colorado Avalanche (from Phoenix)	University of Denver (WCHA)
45	Guillaume Latendresse (RW)	Canada	Montreal Canadiens (from New York Rangers)	Drummondville Voltigeurs (QMJHL)
46	Dustin Kohn (D)	Canada	New York Islanders	Calgary Hitmen (WHL)
47	Tom Fritsche (LW)	United States	Colorado Avalanche (from Washington)	Ohio State University (CCHA)
48	Philip Gogulla (LW)	Germany	Buffalo Sabres	Kolner Haie (Germany)
49	Chad Denny (D)	Canada	Atlanta Thrashers (from San Jose)	Lewiston Maineiacs (QMJHL)
50	Dany Roussin (LW)	Canada	Los Angeles Kings	Rimouski Océanic (QMJHL)
51	Mason Raymond (LW)	Canada	Vancouver Canucks	Camrose Kodiaks (AJHL)
52	Chris Durand (C)	Canada	Colorado Avalanche (from Ottawa via Washington)	Seattle Thunderbirds (WHL)
53	Andrew Kozek (LW)	Canada	Atlanta Thrashers	South Surrey Eagles (BCHL)
54	Dan Bertram (RW)	Canada	Chicago Blackhawks	Boston College (Hockey East)
55	Adam McQuaid (D)	Canada	Columbus Blue Jackets	Sudbury Wolves (OHL)
56	Marc-Andre Cliche (RW)	Canada	New York Rangers (from Montreal)	Lewiston Maineiacs (QMJHL)
57	Matt Kassian (LW)	Canada	Minnesota Wild	Kamloops Blazers (WHL)
58	Nate Hagemo (D)	United States	Carolina Hurricanes	University of Minnesota (WCHA)
59	Pier-Olivier Pelletier (G)	Canada	Phoenix Coyotes (from Anaheim via Philadelphia)	Drummondville Voltigeurs (QMJHL)
60	T. J. Fast (D)	Canada	Los Angeles Kings (compensatory)	Tri-City Americans (WHL)
61	Michael Gergen (D)	United States	Pittsburgh Penguins	Shattuck-Saint Mary's (Midget Major AAA)

=== Round three ===
#	Player	Nationality	NHL team	College/junior/club team
62	Kris Letang (D)	Canada	Pittsburgh Penguins	Val-d'Or Foreurs (QMJHL)
63	Jason Bailey (RW)	Canada	Mighty Ducks of Anaheim	US NTDP (NAHL)
64	Joe Barnes (C)	Canada	Carolina Hurricanes	Saskatoon Blades (WHL)
65	Kristofer Westblom (G)	Canada	Minnesota Wild	Kelowna Rockets (WHL)
66	Brodie Dupont (C)	Canada	New York Rangers (from Montreal)	Calgary Hitmen (WHL)
67	Kris Russell (D)	Canada	Columbus Blue Jackets	Medicine Hat Tigers (WHL)
68	Evan Brophey (C/LW)	Canada	Chicago Blackhawks	Belleville Bulls (OHL)
69	Gord Baldwin (D)	Canada	Calgary Flames (from Atlanta via Carolina)	Medicine Hat Tigers (WHL)
70	Vitaly Anikeyenko (D)	Russia	Ottawa Senators	Lokomotiv Yaroslavl (Russia)
71	Richard Clune (LW)	Canada	Dallas Stars (from Vancouver)	Sarnia Sting (OHL)
72	Jonathan Quick (G)	United States	Los Angeles Kings	Avon Old Farms (USHS, Connecticut)
73	Radek Smolenak (LW)	Czech Republic	Tampa Bay Lightning (from San Jose)	Kingston Frontenacs (OHL)
74	Daniel Ryder (C)	Canada	Calgary Flames (from Buffalo)	Peterborough Petes (OHL)
75	Perttu Lindgren (C)	Finland	Dallas Stars (from Washington)	Ilves Jr. (Finland)
76	Shea Guthrie (C)	Canada	New York Islanders	St. George's School (USHS, Rhode Island)
77	Dalyn Flatt (D)	Canada	New York Rangers	Saskatoon Blades (WHL)
78	Teemu Laakso (D)	Finland	Nashville Predators (from Phoenix via Carolina)	HIFK Jr. (Finland)
79	Cody Franson (D)	Canada	Nashville Predators	Vancouver Giants (WHL)
80	Christofer Lofberg (C)	Sweden	Detroit Red Wings	Djurgardens IF Jr. (Sweden)
81	Danny Syvret (D)	Canada	Edmonton Oilers (from Philadelphia)	London Knights (OHL)
82	Phil Oreskovic (D)	Canada	Toronto Maple Leafs	Brampton Battalion (OHL)
83	Mikko Lehtonen (RW)	Finland	Boston Bruins	Espoo Blues Jr. (Finland)
84	Mark Fraser (D)	Canada	New Jersey Devils	Kitchener Rangers (OHL)
85	Ben Bishop (G)	United States	St. Louis Blues	Texas Tornado (NAHL)
86	Robby Dee (C)	United States	Edmonton Oilers	Breck School (USHS–MN)
87	Marc-Andre Gragnani (D)	Canada	Buffalo Sabres (from Calgary)	P.E.I. Rocket (QMJHL)
88	T. J. Hensick (C)	United States	Colorado Avalanche	University of Michigan (CCHA)
89	Chris Lawrence (C)	Canada	Tampa Bay Lightning (from Dallas via Philadelphia)	Sault Ste. Marie Greyhounds (OHL)
90	Dan Collins (RW)	United States	Florida Panthers	Plymouth Whalers (OHL)
91	Oskars Bartulis (D)	Latvia	Philadelphia Flyers (from Tampa Bay)	Moncton Wildcats (QMJHL)

=== Round four ===
#	Player	Nationality	NHL team	College/junior/club team
92	Marek Bartanus (RW)	Slovakia	Tampa Bay Lightning	HC Kosice (Slovakia)
93	Olivier Legault (LW)	Canada	Florida Panthers	Lewiston Maineiacs (QMJHL)
94	Jakub Vojta (D)	Czech Republic	Carolina Hurricanes (from Dallas)	Sparta Prague Jr. (Czech Republic)
95	Cody Bass (C)	Canada	Ottawa Senators (from Colorado via Minnesota)	Mississauga IceDogs (OHL)
96	Chris Butler (D)	United States	Buffalo Sabres (from Calgary)	Sioux City Musketeers (USHL)
97	Chris VandeVelde (C)	United States	Edmonton Oilers	Moorhead High School (USHS, Minnesota)
98	Ilya Zubov (C)	Russia	Ottawa Senators (from St. Louis)	Traktor Chelyabinsk (Russia)
99	Patrick Davis (LW)	United States	New Jersey Devils	Kitchener Rangers (OHL)
100	Jonathan Sigalet (D)	United States	Boston Bruins	Bowling Green State University (CCHA)
101	Jared Boll (RW)	United States	Columbus Blue Jackets (from Toronto via Carolina)	Lincoln Stars (USHL)
102	Blair Jones (C)	Canada	Tampa Bay Lightning (from Philadelphia)	Moose Jaw Warriors (WHL)
103	Mattias Ritola (C/W)	Sweden	Detroit Red Wings	Leksands IF Jr. (Sweden)
104	Matt Duffy (D)	United States	Florida Panthers (from Nashville)	New Hampshire Jr Monarchs (EJHL)
105	Keith Yandle (D)	United States	Phoenix Coyotes	Cushing Academy (USHS, Massachusetts)
106	Vladimir Sobotka (C)	Czech Republic	Boston Bruins (compensatory)	HC Slavia Praha Jr. (Czech Republic)
107	Tom Pyatt (C)	Canada	New York Rangers	Saginaw Spirit (OHL)
108	Niklas Hjalmarsson (D)	Sweden	Chicago Blackhawks (from New York Islanders)	HV71 Jr. (Sweden)
109	Andrew Thomas (D)	United States	Washington Capitals	University of Denver (WCHA)
110	Kyle Bailey (C)	Canada	Minnesota Wild (from Buffalo)	Portland Winterhawks (WHL)
111	J. D. Watt (RW)	Canada	Calgary Flames (compensatory)	Vancouver Giants (WHL)
112	Alex Stalock (G)	United States	San Jose Sharks	Cedar Rapids RoughRiders (USHL)
113	Nathan Davis (C)	United States	Chicago Blackhawks (from Los Angeles)	Miami University (CCHA)
114	Alexandre Vincent (G)	Canada	Vancouver Canucks	Chicoutimi Sagueneens (QMJHL)
115	Janne Kolehmainen (LW)	Finland	Ottawa Senators	SaiPa (Finland)
116	Jordan Smotherman (LW)	United States	Atlanta Thrashers	Quebec Remparts (QMJHL)
117	Denis Istomin (RW)	Russia	Chicago Blackhawks	Traktor Chelyabinsk (Russia)
118	Patrick McNeill (D)	Canada	Washington Capitals (from Boston; compensatory)	Saginaw Spirit (OHL)
119	Jeremy Duchesne (G)	Canada	Philadelphia Flyers (from Columbus via Phoenix)	Halifax Mooseheads (QMJHL)
120	Vyacheslav Trukhno (C)	Russia	Edmonton Oilers (compensatory)	P.E.I. Rocket (QMJHL)
121	Juraj Mikus (C/W)	Slovakia	Montreal Canadiens	HK 36 Skalica Jr. (Slovakia)
122	Morten Madsen (LW)	Denmark	Minnesota Wild	Frolunda HC Jr. (Sweden)
123	Ondrej Otcenas (LW)	Slovakia	Carolina Hurricanes	HC Dukla Trencin Jr. (Slovakia)
124	Ray Macias (D)	United States	Colorado Avalanche (from Anaheim)	Kamloops Blazers (WHL)
125	Tommi Leinonen (D)	Finland	Pittsburgh Penguins	Karpat Jr. (Finland)

=== Round five ===
#	Player	Nationality	NHL team	College/junior/club team
126	Tim Crowder (RW)	Canada	Pittsburgh Penguins	South Surrey Eagles (BCHL)
127	Bobby Bolt (LW)	Canada	Mighty Ducks of Anaheim	Kingston Frontenacs (OHL)
128	Kevin Lalande (G)	Canada	Calgary Flames (from Carolina)	Belleville Bulls (OHL)
129	Anthony Aiello (D)	United States	Minnesota Wild	Thayer Academy (USHS)
130	Mathieu Aubin (C)	Canada	Montreal Canadiens	Lewiston Maineiacs (QMJHL)
131	Tomas Popperle (G)	Czech Republic	Columbus Blue Jackets	Sparta Prague (Czech Republic)
132	Darren Helm (C)	Canada	Detroit Red Wings (compensatory)	Medicine Hat Tigers (WHL)
133	Stanislav Lascek (RW)	Slovakia	Tampa Bay Lightning (compensatory)	Chicoutimi Saguenéens (QMJHL)
134	Brennan Turner (D)	Canada	Chicago Blackhawks	Notre Dame Hounds (SJHL)
135	Tomas Pospisil (RW)	Czech Republic	Atlanta Thrashers	Ocelari Trinec Jr. (Czech Republic)
136	Tomas Kudelka (D)	Czech Republic	Ottawa Senators	HC Zlin Jr. (Czech Republic)
137	Johan Ryno (C)	Sweden	Detroit Red Wings (compensatory)	Kumla Hockey Jr. (Sweden)
138	Matt Butcher (C)	United States	Vancouver Canucks	Chilliwack Chiefs (BCHL)
139	Patrik Hersley (D)	Sweden	Los Angeles Kings	Malmo Redhawks Jr. (Sweden)
140	Taylor Dakers (G)	Canada	San Jose Sharks (compensatory)	Kootenay Ice (WHL)
141	Brian Salcido (D)	United States	Mighty Ducks of Anaheim (from San Jose)	Colorado College (WCHA)
142	Nathan Gerbe (C)	United States	Buffalo Sabres	Boston College (Hockey East)
143	Daren Machesney (G)	Canada	Washington Capitals	Brampton Battalion (OHL)
144	Masi Marjamaki (RW)	Finland	New York Islanders	Moose Jaw Warriors (WHL)
145	Tim Kunes (D)	United States	Carolina Hurricanes (compensatory)	New England Junior Falcons (EJHL)
146	Tom Wandell (C)	Sweden	Dallas Stars (compensatory)	Södertalje SK Jr. (Sweden)
147	Trevor Koverko (D)	Canada	New York Rangers	Owen Sound Attack (OHL)
148	Anton Krysanov (C)	Russia	Phoenix Coyotes	Lada Togliatti (Russia)
149	Derek Joslin (D)	Canada	San Jose Sharks (compensatory)	Ottawa 67's (OHL)
150	Cal O'Reilly (C)	Canada	Nashville Predators	Windsor Spitfires (OHL)
151	Jeff May (D)	Canada	Detroit Red Wings	Prince Albert Raiders (WHL)
152	Josh Beaulieu (C)	Canada	Philadelphia Flyers	London Knights (OHL)
153	Alex Berry (RW)	United States	Toronto Maple Leafs	Boston Junior Bruins (EJHL)
154	Wacey Rabbit (C)	Canada	Boston Bruins	Saskatoon Blades (WHL)
155	Mark Fayne (D)	United States	New Jersey Devils	Noble and Greenough School (USHS–MA)
156	Ryan Reaves (RW)	Canada	St. Louis Blues	Brandon Wheat Kings (WHL)
157	Fredrik Pettersson (LW)	Sweden	Edmonton Oilers	Frolunda HC Jr. (Sweden)
158	Matt Keetley (G)	Canada	Calgary Flames	Medicine Hat Tigers (WHL)
159	Risto Korhonen (D)	Finland	Carolina Hurricanes (from Colorado)	Karpat Jr. (Finland)
160	Matt Watkins (RW)	Canada	Dallas Stars	Vernon Vipers (BCHL)
161	Brian Foster (G)	United States	Florida Panthers	New Hampshire Junior Monarchs (EJHL)
162	P. J. Fenton (LW)	United States	San Jose Sharks (from Tampa Bay)	University of Massachusetts Amherst (Hockey East)

=== Round six ===
#	Player	Nationality	NHL team	College/junior/club team
163	Marek Kvapil (RW)	Czech Republic	Tampa Bay Lightning	Saginaw Spirit (OHL)
164	Roman Derlyuk (D)	Russia	Florida Panthers	Spartak St. Petersburg (Russia)
165	Kevin Beech (G)	Canada	Tampa Bay Lightning (from Dallas)	Sudbury Wolves (OHL)
166	Jason Lynch (D)	Canada	Colorado Avalanche	Spokane Chiefs (WHL)
167	Joe Fallon (G)	United States	Chicago Blackhawks (from Calgary)	University of Vermont (ECAC)
168	Justin Mercier (LW)	United States	Colorado Avalanche (from Edmonton)	US NTDP (NAHL)
169	Mike Gauthier (D)	Canada	St. Louis Blues	Prince Albert Raiders (WHL)
170	Sean Zimmerman (D)	United States	New Jersey Devils	Spokane Chiefs (WHL)
171	Nick Drazenovic (C)	Canada	St. Louis Blues (compensatory)	Prince George Cougars (WHL)
172	Lukas Vantuch (RW)	Czech Republic	Boston Bruins	Bili Tygri Liberec Jr. (Czech Republic)
173	Johan Dahlberg (LW)	Sweden	Toronto Maple Leafs	Modo Hockey Jr. (Sweden)
174	John Flatters (D)	Canada	Philadelphia Flyers	Red Deer Rebels (WHL)
175	Juho Mielonen (D)	Finland	Detroit Red Wings	Ilves Jr. (Finland)
176	Ryan Maki (RW)	United States	Nashville Predators	Harvard University (ECAC)
177	Derek Reinhart (D)	Canada	Columbus Blue Jackets (from Phoenix)	Regina Pats (WHL)
178	Greg Beller (LW)	Canada	New York Rangers	Lake of the Woods School (USHS–MN)
179	Brett Sutter (LW)	Canada	Calgary Flames (compensatory)	Kootenay Ice (WHL)
180	Tyrell Mason (D)	Canada	New York Islanders	Salmon Arm Silverbacks (BCHL)
181	Tim Kennedy (LW)	United States	Washington Capitals	Sioux City Musketeers (USHL)
182	Adam Dennis (G)	Canada	Buffalo Sabres	London Knights (OHL)
183	Will Colbert (D)	Canada	San Jose Sharks	Ottawa 67's (OHL)
184	Ryan McGinnis (D)	United States	Los Angeles Kings	Plymouth Whalers (OHL)
185	Kris Fredheim (D)	Canada	Vancouver Canucks	Notre Dame Hounds (SJHL)
186	Dmitri Megalinsky (D)	Russia	Ottawa Senators	Lokomotiv Yaroslavl (Russia)
187	Andrei Zubarev (D)	Russia	Atlanta Thrashers	Salavat Yulayev Ufa (Russia)
188	Joe Charlebois (D)	United States	Chicago Blackhawks	Sioux City Musketeers (USHL)
189	Kirill Starkov (C)	Russia	Columbus Blue Jackets	Frolunda HC Jr. (Sweden)
190	Matt D'Agostini (RW)	Canada	Montreal Canadiens	Guelph Storm (OHL)
191	Vyacheslav Buravchikov (D)	Russia	Buffalo Sabres (from Minnesota)	Krylia Sovetov Moscow (Russia)
192	Nicolas Blanchard (LW)	Canada	Carolina Hurricanes	Chicoutimi Sagueneens (QMJHL)
193	Tony Lucia (LW)	United States	San Jose Sharks (from Anaheim)	Wayzata High School (USHS–MN)
194	Jean-Philippe Paquet (D)	Canada	Pittsburgh Penguins	Shawinigan Cataractes (QMJHL)

=== Round seven ===
#	Player	Nationality	NHL team	College/junior/club team
195	Joe Vitale (C)	United States	Pittsburgh Penguins	Sioux Falls Stampede (USHL)
196	Nick Tuzzolino (D)	United States	New York Islanders (compensatory)	Sarnia Sting (OHL)
197	Jean-Philippe Levasseur (G)	Canada	Mighty Ducks of Anaheim	Rouyn-Noranda Huskies (QMJHL)
198	Kyle Lawson (D)	United States	Carolina Hurricanes	US NTDP (NAHL)
199	Riley Emmerson (RW)	Canada	Minnesota Wild	Tri-City Americans (WHL)
200	Sergei Kostitsyn (LW)	Belarus	Montreal Canadiens	HK Gomel (Extraleague)
201	Trevor Hendrikx (D)	Canada	Columbus Blue Jackets	Peterborough Petes (OHL)
202	David Kuchejda (RW)	Czech Republic	Chicago Blackhawks	HC Ceske Budejovice (Czech Republic)
203	Adam Hobson (C)	Canada	Chicago Blackhawks (from Atlanta)	Spokane Chiefs (WHL)
204	Colin Greening (LW)	Canada	Ottawa Senators	Upper Canada College (CISAA, Ontario HS)
205	Mario Bliznak (C)	Slovakia	Vancouver Canucks	HK Dubnica (Slovakia)
206	Josh Meyers (D)	United States	Los Angeles Kings	Sioux City Musketeers (USHL)
207	Myles Stoesz (LW)	Canada	Atlanta Thrashers (from San Jose)	Spokane Chiefs (WHL)
208	Matt Generous (D)	United States	Buffalo Sabres	New England Junior Falcons (EJHL)
209	Viktor Dovgan (D)	Russia	Washington Capitals	CSKA Moscow Jr. (Russia)
210	Luciano Aquino (RW)	Canada	New York Islanders	Brampton Battalion (OHL)
211	Ryan Russell (C)	Canada	New York Rangers	Kootenay Ice (WHL)
212	Pat Brosnihan (RW)	United States	Phoenix Coyotes	Worcester Academy (USHS–MA)
213	Scott Todd (D)	Canada	Nashville Predators	Windsor Spitfires (OHL)
214	Bretton Stamler (D)	Canada	Detroit Red Wings	Seattle Thunderbirds (WHL)
215	Matt Clackson (LW)	Canada	Philadelphia Flyers	Chicago Steel (USHL)
216	Anton Stralman (D)	Sweden	Toronto Maple Leafs	Skovde IK (Sweden)
217	Brock Bradford (C)	Canada	Boston Bruins	Omaha Lancers (USHL)
218	Alexander Sundstrom (C)	Sweden	New Jersey Devils	IF Bjorkloven (Sweden)
219	Nikolai Lemtyugov (RW)	Russia	St. Louis Blues	CSKA Moscow (Russia)
220	Matthew Glasser (LW)	Canada	Edmonton Oilers	Fort McMurray Oil Barons (AJHL)
221	Myles Rumsey (D)	Canada	Calgary Flames	Swift Current Broncos (WHL)
222	Kyle Cumiskey (D)	Canada	Colorado Avalanche	Kelowna Rockets (WHL)
223	Pat McGann (G)	United States	Dallas Stars	Illinois Midgets (USMHL)
224	Zach Bearson (RW)	United States	Florida Panthers	Waterloo Black Hawks (USHL)
225	John Wessbecker (D)	United States	Tampa Bay Lightning	Blake School (USHS–MN)
226	John Seymour (LW)	Canada	Los Angeles Kings (from Columbus)	Brampton Battalion (OHL)
227	Andrew Orpik (RW)	United States	Buffalo Sabres (from San Jose)	Thayer Academy (USHS–MA)
228	Chad Rau (C)	United States	Toronto Maple Leafs (compensatory)	US NTDP (NAHL)
229	Philippe Paquet (D)	Canada	Montreal Canadiens (compensatory)	Salisbury School (USHS–CT)
230	Patric Hornqvist (RW)	Sweden	Nashville Predators (compensatory)	Vasby IK (Sweden)

== Draftees based on nationality ==
Rank	Country	Picks	Percent	Top selection
	North America	172	74.7%	
1	Canada	109	47.5%	Sidney Crosby, 1st
2	United States	63	27.4%	Bobby Ryan, 2nd
	Europe	58	25.2%	
3	Czech Republic	12	5.2%	Martin Hanzal, 17th
3	Sweden	12	5.2%	Niclas Bergfors, 23rd
3	Russia	12	5.2%	Vitaly Anikeyenko, 70th
6	Finland	9	3.9%	Tuukka Rask, 21st
7	Slovakia	8	3.5%	Marek Zagrapan, 13th
8	Slovenia	1	0.4%	Anze Kopitar, 11th
8	Germany	1	0.4%	Philip Gogulla, 48th
8	Latvia	1	0.4%	Oskars Bartulis, 91st
8	Denmark	1	0.4%	Morten Madsen, 122nd
8	Belarus	1	0.4%	Sergei Kostitsyn, 200th

=== North American draftees by state/province ===
Rank	State/Province	Selections	Top selection
1	Ontario	35	Benoit Pouliot, 4th
2	British Columbia	19	Carey Price, 5th
3	Alberta	18	Devin Setoguchi, 8th
4	Minnesota	17	Brian Lee, 9th
4	Quebec	17	Sasha Pokulok, 14th
6	Manitoba	9	Eric Fehr, 18th
7	Michigan	8	Jack Johnson, 3rd
8	New York	7	Matt Lashoff, 22nd
8	Massachusetts	7	Keith Yandle, 105th
10	Saskatchewan	5	Chris Durand, 52nd
11	Missouri	4	Paul Stastny, 44th
12	Illinois	3	Jared Boll, 101st
13	Nova Scotia	2	Sidney Crosby, 1st
13	Washington	2	T.J. Oshie, 24th
13	Ohio	2	Tom Fritsche, 47th
13	Newfoundland and Labrador	2	Dan Ryder, 74th
13	New Hampshire	2	Andrew Thomas, 109th
13	California	2	Ray Macias, 124th
19	New Jersey	1	Bobby Ryan, 2nd
19	Wisconsin	1	Jack Skille, 7th
19	New Brunswick	1	Luc Bourdon, 10th
19	Prince Edward Island	1	Adam McQuaid, 55th
19	Connecticut	1	Jonathan Quick, 72nd
19	Maine	1	Matt Duffy, 104th
19	Pennsylvania	1	Justin Mercier, 168th
19	Colorado	1	Sean Zimmerman, 170th

== See also ==
- 2005–06 NHL season
- List of NHL first overall draft choices
- List of NHL players
