= 2004 World U-17 Hockey Challenge =

Tournament details
- Host country: Canada
- Venue(s): Mary Brown’s Centre; Glacier Arena (in 2 host cities)
- Dates: December 29, 2003–January 4, 2004
- Teams: 10

Final positions
- Champions: Canada Ontario (5th title)

Tournament statistics
- Games played: 28
- Goals scored: 227 (8.11 per game)

The 2004 World U-17 Hockey Challenge was an international ice hockey tournament held in Newfoundland, Canada between . The two main venues were the Mile One Stadium in St. John's and the Glacier Arena in Mount Pearl, while the S. W. Moores Arena in Harbour Grace and the Whitbourne Arena were also used for exhibition games.

Ten teams participated, including the United States, Russia, Slovakia, Germany, Finland and five regional teams representing Canada – Canada Pacific, Canada West, Canada Quebec, Canada Ontario and Canada Atlantic. Team Ontario defeated Team Pacific 5–2 to win the gold medal, while Team Quebec defeated the United States 3–2 to capture the bronze, marking the first time in the tournament's history that Canada swept all three medals.

== Challenge results ==
	Team
1st place, gold medalist(s)	Canada Ontario
2nd place, silver medalist(s)	Canada Pacific
3rd place, bronze medalist(s)	Canada Quebec
4	United States

== See also ==
- 2004 Ivan Hlinka Memorial Tournament
- 2004 IIHF World U18 Championships
- 2004 World Junior Championships
