= 2004 U-18 Junior World Cup =

Tournament details
- Host countries: Czech Republic; Slovakia
- Venue(s): 3 (in 3 host cities)
- Dates: August 10–15, 2004
- Teams: 8

Final positions
- Champions: Canada (10th title)
- Runner-up: Czech Republic
- Third place: Sweden
- Fourth place: United States

Tournament statistics
- Games played: 18

The 2004 U-18 Junior World Cup was an under-18 ice hockey tournament held in Břeclav and Hodonín, Czech Republic and Piešťany, Slovakia from August 10–15, 2004. Canada captured their tenth gold medal of the tournament, defeating the Czech Republic 4–1 in the gold medal game, while Sweden defeated the United States to earn the bronze medal.

== Final round ==
=== Gold medal game ===
| August 15, 2004; 18:15 | Canada | 4–1 | Czech Republic | Břeclav, Czech Republic |

Brock Bradford (11:20); Gilbert Brulé (21:02 PP); Cal Clutterbuck (16:34 SH); Dan Bertram (28:54 PP) / Goals / Tomas Popisil (54:13)

== Final standings ==
| Rk. | Team |
|---|---|
| 1st place, gold medalist(s) | Canada |
| 2nd place, silver medalist(s) | Czech Republic |
| 3rd place, bronze medalist(s) | Sweden |
| 4. | United States |
| 5. | Russia |
| 6. | Slovakia |
| 7. | Finland |
| 8. | Switzerland |

== See also ==
- 2004 IIHF World U18 Championships
- 2008 World Junior Championships

| Preceded by 2003 U-18 Junior World Cup | U-18 Junior World Cup; 2004 | Succeeded by 2005 U-18 Junior World Cup |
