= Cam Ward (ice hockey) =

Canadian ice hockey player (born 1984)

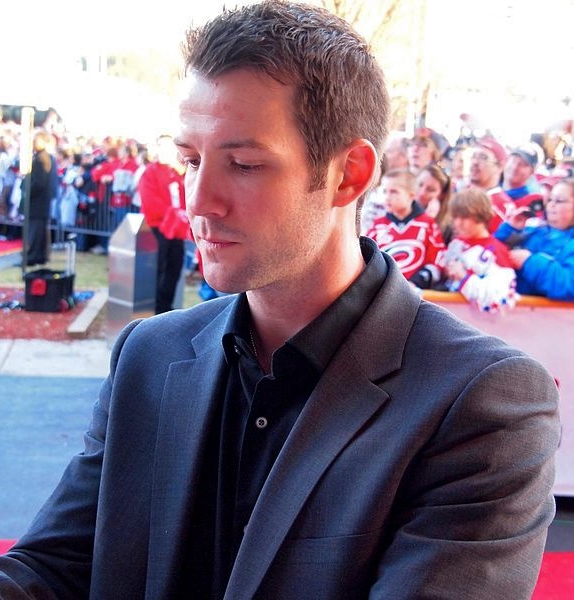
- Ward in 2011
- Born: February 29, 1984 (age 42) Saskatoon, Saskatchewan, Canada
- Height: 6 ft 1 in (185 cm)
- Weight: 185 lb (84 kg; 13 st 3 lb)
- Position: Goaltender
- Caught: Left
- Played for: Carolina Hurricanes; Chicago Blackhawks
- National team: Canada
- NHL draft: 25th overall, 2002; Carolina Hurricanes
- Playing career: 2004–2019

Cameron Kenneth Ward (born February 29, 1984) is a Canadian former professional ice hockey goaltender. He played the majority of his 15-year professional career for the Carolina Hurricanes of the National Hockey League (NHL). He played his final season for the Chicago Blackhawks before retiring in 2019.

Ward was born in Saskatoon, growing up there and in Sherwood Park, Alberta. During his three-year junior career in the Western Hockey League (WHL) with the Red Deer Rebels, he was selected 25th overall by the Hurricanes in the 2002 NHL entry draft. After a season with the Hurricanes' American Hockey League (AHL) affiliate, the Lowell Lock Monsters, he won the Stanley Cup with the Hurricanes in 2006, winning the Conn Smythe Trophy as the most valuable player in the playoffs. He became the first starting goaltender to win the Stanley Cup as a rookie since Patrick Roy in 1986.

== Early life ==
Ward was born on February 29, 1984, to parents Ken and Laurel Ward in Saskatoon, Saskatchewan. He was raised in a Christian family and was baptized in an outdoor lake at the age of eight. Ward learned to skate in Regina and began playing with the Saskatoon Flyers' pre-novice team in 1990 at the age of six. As a youth, he played all positions before eventually choosing to remain as a goaltender. He made this choice because he "liked the mentality" of being the last line of defence. After his family moved to Sherwood Park, Alberta, Ward played minor hockey in Sherwood's Peewee A, Bantam AAA, and Midget AAA divisions.

== Playing career ==
=== Early career ===
After spending the 1998–99 season playing AAA hockey in Sherwood Park, Ward was drafted in the fourth round, 63rd overall, of the 1999 Western Hockey League (WHL) bantam draft by the Red Deer Rebels. Despite being drafted, he did not play for the Rebels until he was 17. Ward spent the 1999–00 season with the Sherwood Park Kings U18 AAA team and finished with a 3.57 goals against average (GAA). He then participated in the Rebels' 2000 training camp and preseason, where he impressed the team's general manager and head coach Brent Sutter. His efforts in the Rebels preseason games made the coaching staff strongly consider keeping him on the team as a 16-year-old for the 2000–01 season. While Ward was ultimately reassigned to the Sherwood Park Kings, he was called up to the Rebels on February 1, 2001 to back up goaltender Shane Bendera. Prior this callup, Ward was selected for the Alberta Midget AAA Hockey League North Division first all-star team. He made his WHL regular-season debut on February 4 and blocked all 25 shots he faced from the Saskatoon Blades for his first WHL shutout and win. After returning to the Sherwood Park Kings, he finished the season fifth in the league with a 2.90 goals against average and was named league MVP.

=== Major junior career ===
Ward participated in the Rebels' 2001 training camp and preseason games before joining them full-time for the 2001–02 season. He made 32 saves in his first start of the season against the Regina Pats on September 26, 2001. By the end of the month, he had a 1.43 goals against average after only allowing three goals over two starts. Ward went undefeated through October before losing his first game on November 11 against the Prince George Cougars. Despite his goals against average slightly increasing, he ranked second in the league with 1.98 by mid-November. Due in part to Ward's dominant rookie season, the Rebels traded starting goaltender Bendera to the Kelowna Rockets in mid-December. As a result, Ward was expected to take over the responsibilities of the Rebels' starting goaltender. Ward later stated that the trade boosted his confidence because of the greater responsibility and increased ice time. As a result of his play, Ward was ranked ninth among all draft-eligible goaltenders by the NHL Central Scouting Bureau in their mid-season rankings. Ward finished the regular season with 30 wins, 2.27 goals against average, and a .911 save percentage (SV%). His 2.27 goals against average set a franchise record as the lowest average ever recorded. He was subsequently named to the Eastern Conference All-Star Team and nominated for the Del Wilson Trophy as the WHL's top goaltender.

Ward's efforts helped the Rebels qualify for the 2002 WHL playoffs, where they faced the Lethbridge Hurricanes in the opening round. He helped the Rebels sweep the Hurricanes in four games and advance to the Eastern Conference semifinals. After beating the Moose Jaw Warriors, Ward ranked third among active playoff goaltenders with a 2.15 goals-against average. He was an honourable mention for the WHL's Player of the Week as he helped the Rebels advance to the Eastern Conference finals against the Brandon Wheat Kings. When the Rebels were close to elimination, Ward recorded back-to-back wins in games five and six to keep the Rebels in the playoffs and force a game seven. His efforts were recognized by the league with their Player of the Week honour. After the Rebels eliminated the Wheat Kings and advanced to the WHL Championship, Ward was awarded the Del Wilson Trophy as the WHL's top goaltender. He finished the playoffs with 14 wins as the Rebels fell to the Kootenay Ice in the finals.

Heading into the 2002 NHL entry draft, Ward was ranked second among all draft-eligible WHL goaltenders and fourth among all North American draft-eligible goaltenders by the NHL Central Scouting Bureau. In spite of this, he was drafted ahead of three other goaltenders ranked ahead of him. Ward was selected in the first round, 25th overall, by the Carolina Hurricanes in the entry draft. One of the reason for his higher-than-expected draft selection was because the father of a Hurricanes scout lived in Red Deer and closely followed Ward's season. Following the draft, Ward attended the Hurricanes rookie camp and main camp before being returned to the Rebels. He later credited his extra time spent with Archie Irbe at the Hurricanes main camp as the reason for his strong start to the 2002–03 season.

In his second season with the Rebels, Ward improved upon his rookie season statistics and helped the Rebels return to the WHL playoffs. By the start of November, Ward led the league in wins, goals against, and save percentage and was named to the WHL Eastern Conference All-Star team to compete in the Hershey Cup CHL All-Star Series. Later that month, he was recognized as the WHL's Player of the Week after winning three consecutive games and maintaining a league-best .928 SV%. As Ward's backup goaltender struggled in his reliever role, the Rebels signed free agent goaltender Ben McMullin to replace him in January. Although Ward still played the majority of games, both goaltenders set personal bests and helped the Rebels set a new Canadian Hockey League record for fewest goals against in a season. After concluding the regular season with a league-leading 40 wins, Ward was named the inaugural winner of the Western Major Junior Hockey Writers Association's Goaltender of the Year award. Ward started the 2003 Eastern Conference semifinals against the Medicine Hat Tigers with two wins, a 1.00 goals-against average, and a .959 SV%. He was subsequently recognized as the WHL's Player of the Week. Despite being pushed to the brink of elimination, Ward stopped 25 shots in game seven to help the Rebels advance to the Eastern Conference final. After winning game one and tying a WHL record with his third career postseason shutout in game two, Ward was honoured as the WHL's Player of the Week on April 21. The Rebels eliminated the Wheat Kings in five games and advanced to the 2003 WHL Championship. However, they lost to the Kelowna Rockets in six games.

Ward attended the Hurricanes 2003 training camp but remained unsigned to an NHL contract. If the Hurricanes did not offer him a contract by July 1, 2004, he would re-enter the 2004 NHL entry draft. While he played in the Hurricanes preseason games, head coach Paul Maurice said Ward was at training camp solely for the learning experience and would be returned to the Rebels for the 2003–04 season. Upon rejoining the Rebels, Ward was named to Team WHL for the 2003 CHL Canada/Russia Series. As with previous seasons, Ward started the majority of Rebels games, including 22 consecutive games through December, January, and February. Despite missing a week of games due to illness, Ward maintained a 4–0–1 record through the month to help the Rebels clinch second place in the Central Division. He was subsequently recognized as the WHL's Player of the Month of March, and named Team MVP by the Rebels. Ward finished the 2003–04 regular season with 31 wins, a 2.05 GAA. and .926 SV%. In the 2004 WHL playoffs, Ward helped the Rebels reach the Eastern Conference finals by recording three shutouts, a 1.85 GAA and .945 SV%. His three shutouts moved him into second place on the WHL's all-time longest shutout streak in postseason history. As a result of his play, Ward was awarded the 2004 Four Broncos Memorial Trophy as the WHL's MVP and his second Del Wilson Trophy. Ward signed a standard three-year, entry-level contract with the Hurricanes on May 13, 2004. While he insisted on signing for under the maximum amount allotted for rookies, he still received a signing bonus and performance bonuses.

=== Lowell Lock Monsters ===
Due to the 2004–05 NHL lockout, Ward was assigned to Carolina's American Hockey League (AHL) affiliate, the Lowell Lock Monsters, for the season. He split his time in net with Calgary Flames prospect Brent Krahn and went 4–6–1 through his first 11 games. Ward recorded his first professional shutout on December 12 against the Hershey Bears and ended the month as the AHL's Rookie of the December after posting 1.10 GAA and .965 SV%. Ward finished his rookie season as the Lowell Lock Monsters franchise leader in wins, GAA, and SV% and was named to the AHL's All-Rookie Team.

=== Carolina Hurricanes ===
==== Rookie season and Stanley Cup win (2005–2006) ====
Once the lockout ended, Ward joined the Hurricanes for the 2005–06 NHL season and was expected to serve in a primarily backup role to veteran goaltender Martin Gerber. Ward unexpectedly made his NHL debut on October 5, 2005, after Gerber got injured mid-game. He saved 10 of 11 shots in the third period, as the Hurricanes lost 5–2 to the Tampa Bay Lightning. He made his first NHL start the following game against the Pittsburgh Penguins and stopped all three shots in the shootout for his first NHL win. As Gerber remained injured, Ward became the Hurricanes starting goaltender and maintained a 3–1–0 record, a 2.05 goals against average, and a .932 save percentage. His efforts earned him a place on Team Canada's long list for the 2006 Winter Olympic Games. Once Gerber recovered from his injury, the Hurricanes began alternating between the two goaltenders. However, Ward began to struggle through November and Gerber again took over as the Hurricanes starting goaltender. By the start of December, Ward had only played in nine games and maintained a 3.67 goals against average. After losing his next four games, Ward was reassigned to the AHL on a conditioning stint on December 14. Ward earned two stars over four days with Lowell, and stopped 54 of 59 total shots. He was called back to the NHL level on December 20 and participated in their practice the following day. Ward made his first start for the Hurricanes in over a month on December 29 against the Ottawa Senators. He slowly began to find success as the season continued and in January, helped the Hurricanes tie a franchise record for most consecutive home wins in a season. While still splitting the starting role, Ward won his next five starts through the end of January and into early February. This gave him a 11-4–2 record and 3.41 goals against average.

When the Hurricanes qualified for the 2006 Stanley Cup playoffs, Gerber was named the starting goaltender for their first-round series against the Montreal Canadiens. However, after losing game one and allowing three goal in the first period of game two, head coach Peter Laviolette replaced him in net with Ward for the second period. In his playoffs debut, Ward made 20 saves through 67 minutes as he helped the Hurricanes tie the game and push the Canadiens to double overtime. His efforts earned him his first playoff start in game three, where he made 27 saves for his first playoff win. He won his next three starts to defeat the Canadiens and advance the Hurricanes to the second round. Upon winning game six, Ward became the fifth goaltender since 1968 to win the first four playoff starts of their career. He continued his winning streak into the Eastern Conference semifinals and tied Tiny Thompson's league record with seven wins in seven consecutive starts. During this streak, Ward was also credited with his first career playoff shutout. However, he was unable to pass Thompson's record after being replaced with Gerber mid-way through game four. When speaking of this decision, Laviolette said: "I pulled Cam Ward because our team was going down (the wrong) road...Instead of letting it go, I made a change to try to change the course of the game." However, he returned as the starter for game five and made 17 saves to eliminate the Devils and advance the Hurricanes to the Eastern Conference Finals.

Ward continued to maintain his role as the Hurricanes starter and played nearly every game of the Eastern Conference finals against the Buffalo Sabres. Upon playing in game one of the series, Ward and Sabres goaltender Ryan Miller became the first rookie goaltenders to play against each other in a conference championship game since 1981. However, Ward struggled early on in the series and was replaced with Geber in games three and four. Ward returned to the ice as a replacement for Gerber mid-way through game five and was named the starter for games six and seven. As the starter, he made 22 saves on 24 shots to help the Hurricanes defeat the Sabres and advance to the 2006 Stanley Cup Final. On June 7, Ward stopped all 25 shots from the Oilers to become the first rookie goaltender to record a shutout in the Finals since Patrick Roy in 1986. Throughout the seven-game series, Ward allowed only 16 goals and finished with a .921 save percentage. His 15 wins as a rookie tied the league's record, and he became the first rookie goalie to win the Conn Smythe Trophy since Ron Hextall in 1987.

==== Early development and struggles (2006–2010) ====
After Gerber left in free agency, the Hurricanes signed John Grahame to serve as Ward's backup for the 2006–07 season. Ward started 11 consecutive games from October 25 to November 15. During this stretch, he also recorded his first regular-season shutout against the Washington Capitals on November 9, 2006. On March 11, 2007, Ward suffered a deep leg laceration by a New York Rangers skate blade and required 11 stitches. He missed numerous games to recover from the injury as he was unable to put pressure on his left knee. In part due to Ward's struggles as the Hurricane's de facto starter, the team failed to qualify for the 2007 Stanley Cup playoffs. He finished the regular season with 30 wins, a 2.93 GAA, and .897 SV%. On May 31, Ward signed a three-year, $8 million contract extension with the Hurricanes.

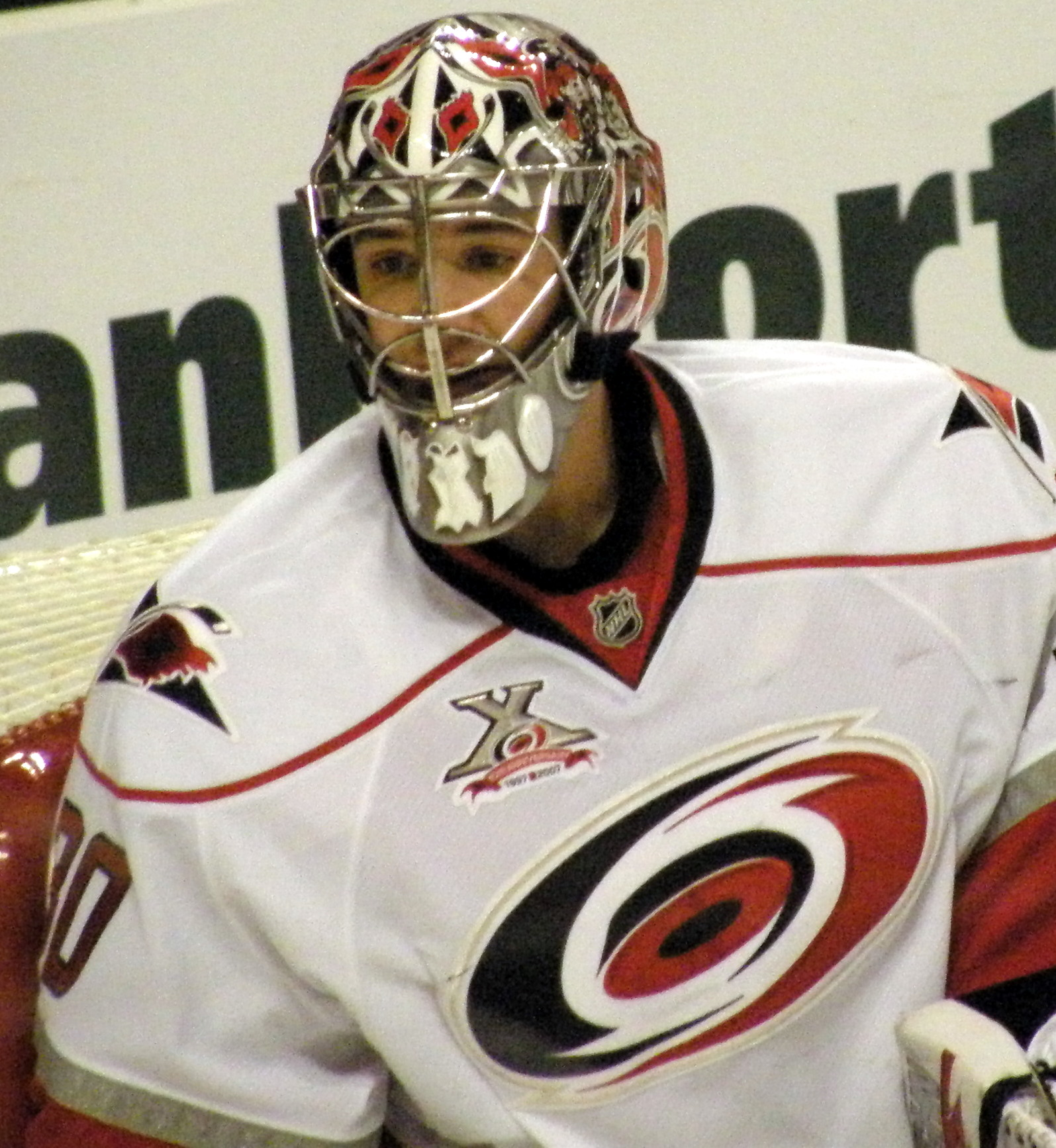
Ward with the Hurricanes in 2008.

Over the 2007 offseason, Ward represented Team Canada at the 2007 IIHF World Championship and focused on improving his diet and cardiovascular abilities. As such, he weighed in 20 pounds lighter than the previous season at the Hurricanes 2007 training camp. After starting the 2007–08 season with four consecutive wins and no regulation losses, Ward was honoured as the NHL's Player of the Week. Ward twice started 10 consecutive games for the Hurricanes through January, February, and March. He finished the regular season with a 37-25-5 record and received the Hurricanes “Good Guy Award” for media cooperation from the Carolina chapter of the Professional Hockey Writers Association.

For the second consecutive offseason, Ward represented Team Canada at the 2008 IIHF World Championship. On January 29, 2009, in his 15th consecutive start, Ward recorded his 100th NHL win following a victory over the Tampa Bay Lightning. He then started 28 consecutive games for the Hurricanes from February 7 to April 11, 2009, en route to the 2009 Stanley Cup playoffs. Ward was recognized as the NHL's Player of the Month after maintaining a 10-1-2 record through March with a 1.98 GAA and a .938 SV%. Shortly after receiving this honour, Ward helped the Hurricanes set numerous franchise records in a 9–0 win over the New York Islanders on April 7. In this game, he tied the franchise record with his sixth shutout of the season while also helping the team match a franchise record of nine consecutive wins. This win also extended the Hurricane's record for most consecutive wins on home ice and gave the New York Islanders their worst loss in franchise history. He finished his 28-game run with a 19-7-2 record, three shutouts, a 2.30 GAA average, and a .922 SV%. After defeating the New Jersey Devils and Boston Bruins, Ward and the Hurricanes fell to the Pittsburgh Penguins in the Stanley Cup Conference Finals. It was later revealed that he had been suffering from back issues throughout the Penguins series. These issues also affected his tryout for Team Canada to compete at the 2010 Winter Olympics. On September 30, 2009, Ward signed a $37.8-million six-year contract extension with the Hurricanes.

Ward struggled in the 2009–10 season and finished with a losing record for the first time in his career as the Hurricanes also failed to qualify for the 2010 Stanley Cup playoffs. The Hurricanes started the season with a losing record of 3–12–5 and a 14-game winless streak. During their 12th loss of the season, Ward was accidentally cut with a skate blade cut during a game against the Columbus Blue Jackets on November 7, 2009. He was subsequently placed on the team's injured reserve list. He missed the remainder of November to recover but returned to the Hurricanes lineup on December 9. Ward made 27 saves in his first game back but the Hurricanes lost 4–2 to the New Jersey Devils. While the team continued to struggle to win games, Ward made 17 consecutive starts through December and January. On January 24, Ward broke Artūrs Irbe's franchise win record with his 131st career win and helped the Hurricanes snap a six-game losing streak. However, shortly after reaching this milestone Ward experienced intense back spasms that were unrelated to his previous injuries. As such, he was sent to a specialist in Charlotte, North Carolina and a decision was made for him to miss numerous weeks to recover. He subsequently missed 19 games before returning on March 30, 2010, and making 26 saves to clinch a win over the Atlanta Thrashers. He finished the season with a 18–23–5 record, a 2.69 GAA and .916 SV% as the Hurricanes failed to qualify for the post-season.

==== All-Star season and injuries (2011–2018) ====
Ward was selected to participate in the 2011 NHL All-Star Game, along with teammates Eric Staal, Jamie McBain, and Jeff Skinner. Ward was the first overall pick in the 2011 NHL All-Star Game Fantasy Draft, selected by All-Star Game captain, Eric Staal.

Ward was credited with an empty-net goal against the New Jersey Devils on December 26, 2011, when a misplaced pass from Ilya Kovalchuk found its way into the empty goal after a rebound from Ward. He is the tenth goalie in NHL history to do this.

Ward recorded his 500th game with the Carolina Hurricanes on February 27, 2015.

During the offseason, Ward re-signed with the Hurricanes to a two-year, $6.6 million contract on June 16, 2016.

On March 22, 2018, during a game against the Arizona Coyotes, the puck got stuck in his skate without his knowledge. His skates crossed the goal line when he went back into the net, ultimately resulting in an own goal. Despite this, the Hurricanes ended up winning that game 6–5.

=== Chicago Blackhawks ===
On July 1, 2018, Ward signed a one-year, $3 million contract with the Chicago Blackhawks. He went 16–12–4 sporting a career worst 3.67 GAA, 897SV% in 33 appearances in the 2018–19 season.

=== Retirement ===
On August 28, 2019, Ward retired from professional hockey and signed a one-day contract with the Hurricanes. He retired as the Hurricanes' franchise leaders in wins (318) and shutouts (27).

== International play ==
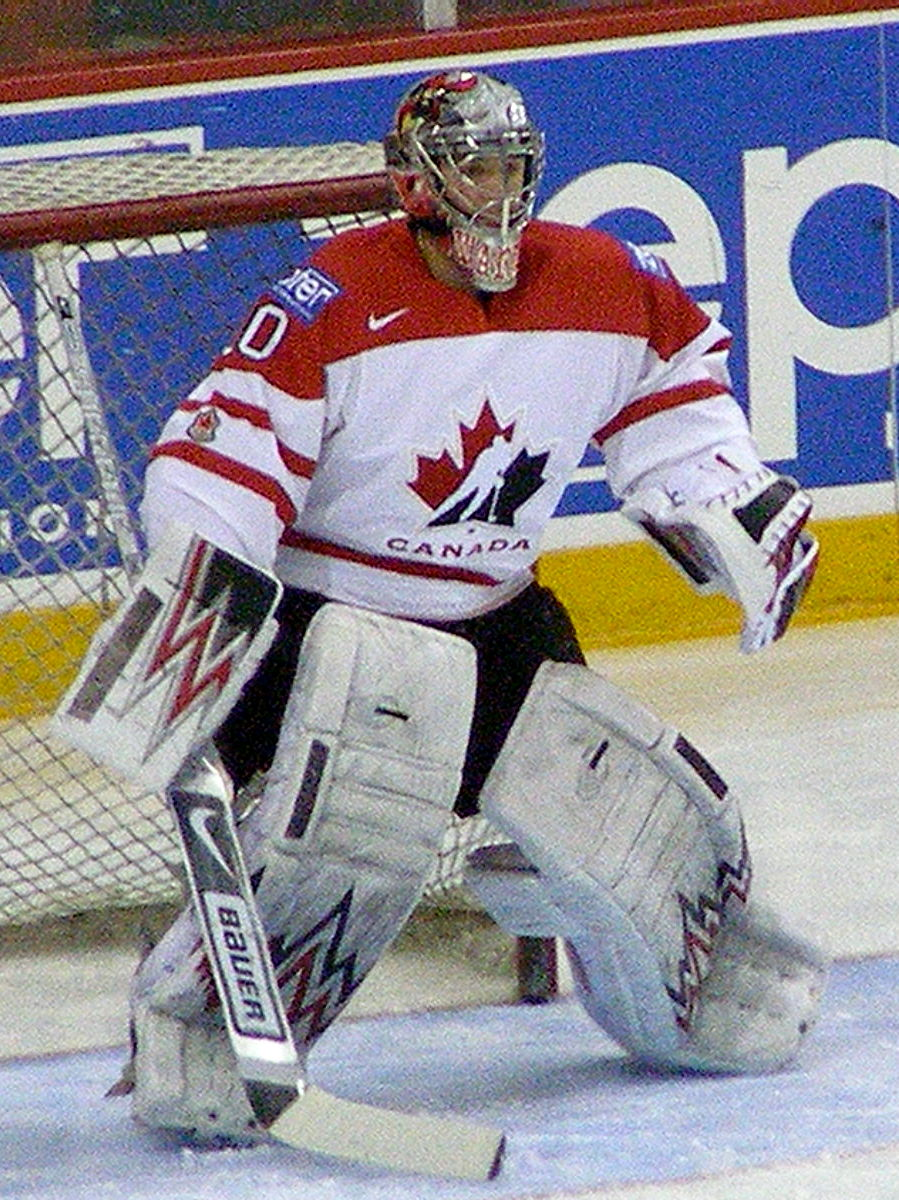
- Ward at the 2008 World Championships

Medal record

Representing Canada

Ice hockey

World Championships
Gold medal – first place	2007 Moscow	
Silver medal – second place	2008 Halifax/Quebec City	

As a member of the Red Deer Rebels, Ward attended Team Canada's tryout camp for the 2003 World Junior Ice Hockey Championships but failed to make the final roster. He was re-invited to Team Canada's tryout camp for the 2004 World Junior Ice Hockey Championships but was again cut before their final roster was announced. Ward eventually made his Team Canada debut at the 2007 IIHF World Championship, where he won a gold medal. He won a silver medal the following year, also as a member of Team Canada, at the 2008 IIHF World Championship.

Ward's performance in his NHL rookie season earned him consideration on a list of 81 candidates to play for Team Canada in the 2006 Winter Olympics. He was one of nine goalies selected; he was not, however, named to the Canadian squad. Additionally, Ward was named a part of the summer camp roster for Team Canada in preparation for the 2010 Winter Olympics, but did not make the final roster cut.

== Personal life ==
Ward and his wife Cody (née Campbell) met while classmates at Hunting Hills High School in Red Deer, Alberta. They were married in the summer of 2006 and have two children together. In a Players' Tribune article in 2016, Ward revealed that their son was born deaf and has a cochlear implant.

As a member of the Carolina Hurricanes, Ward was involved with the Red Deer and North Carolina chapters of the Special Olympics. During the 2008–09 season, Ward donated $11,860 to the North Carolina chapter for every save he made in the regular season. He also bought the Red Deer Jets, a beer hockey team who played games to raise money for the Special Olympics. He donated $20 to the Red Deer chapter for every goal the Jets scored.

In 2017, Ward and former teammate Tim Gleason established a winery in Napa Valley, California.

== Career statistics ==
=== Regular season and playoffs ===
			Regular season									Playoffs
Season	Team	League	GP	W	L	OTL	MIN	GA	SO	GAA	SV%	GP	W	L	MIN	GA	SO	GAA	SV%
2000–01	Red Deer Rebels	WHL	1	1	0	0	60	0	1	0.00	1.000	—	—	—	—	—	—	—	—
2001–02	Red Deer Rebels	WHL	46	30	11	4	2694	102	1	2.27	.911	23	14	9	1502	53	2	2.11	.920
2002–03	Red Deer Rebels	WHL	57	40	13	3	3368	118	5	2.10	.920	23	14	9	1407	49	3	2.08	.919
2003–04	Red Deer Rebels	WHL	56	31	16	8	3338	114	4	2.05	.926	19	10	9	1200	37	3	1.85	.945
2004–05	Lowell Lock Monsters	AHL	50	27	17	3	2829	94	6	1.99	.937	11	5	6	664	28	2	2.53	.918
2005–06	Lowell Lock Monsters	AHL	2	0	2	0	118	5	0	2.54	.915	—	—	—	—	—	—	—	—
2005–06	Carolina Hurricanes	NHL	28	14	8	2	1484	91	0	3.68	.882	23	15	8	1320	47	2	2.14	.920
2006–07	Carolina Hurricanes	NHL	60	30	21	6	3422	167	2	2.93	.897	—	—	—	—	—	—	—	—
2007–08	Carolina Hurricanes	NHL	69	37	25	5	3930	180	4	2.75	.904	—	—	—	—	—	—	—	—
2008–09	Carolina Hurricanes	NHL	68	39	23	5	3928	160	6	2.44	.916	18	8	10	1101	49	2	2.67	.915
2009–10	Carolina Hurricanes	NHL	47	18	23	5	2651	119	0	2.69	.916	—	—	—	—	—	—	—	—
2010–11	Carolina Hurricanes	NHL	74	37	26	10	4318	184	4	2.56	.923	—	—	—	—	—	—	—	—
2011–12	Carolina Hurricanes	NHL	68	30	23	13	3988	182	5	2.74	.915	—	—	—	—	—	—	—	—
2012–13	Carolina Hurricanes	NHL	17	9	6	1	929	44	0	2.84	.908	—	—	—	—	—	—	—	—
2013–14	Carolina Hurricanes	NHL	30	10	12	6	1645	84	0	3.06	.898	—	—	—	—	—	—	—	—
2013–14	Charlotte Checkers	AHL	2	1	1	0	119	4	0	2.02	.937	—	—	—	—	—	—	—	—
2014–15	Carolina Hurricanes	NHL	51	22	24	5	3026	121	1	2.40	.910	—	—	—	—	—	—	—	—
2015–16	Carolina Hurricanes	NHL	52	23	17	10	3039	122	1	2.41	.909	—	—	—	—	—	—	—	—
2016–17	Carolina Hurricanes	NHL	61	26	22	12	3618	162	2	2.69	.905	—	—	—	—	—	—	—	—
2017–18	Carolina Hurricanes	NHL	43	23	14	4	2460	112	2	2.73	.906	—	—	—	—	—	—	—	—
2018–19	Chicago Blackhawks	NHL	33	16	12	4	1883	115	0	3.67	.897	—	—	—	—	—	—	—	—
NHL totals			701	334	256	88	40,319	1,843	27	2.74	.908	41	23	18	2,421	96	4	2.38	.917

=== International ===
Year	Team	Event	Result	GP	W	L	T/OTL	MIN	GA	SO	GAA	SV%
2007	Canada	WC	1st place, gold medalist(s)	5	5	0	0	300	11	0	2.20	.915
2008	Canada	WC	2nd place, silver medalist(s)	5	4	1	0	302	13	0	2.58	.900
2012	Canada	WC	5th	6	4	2	0	360	17	0	2.83	.906
Senior totals				16	13	3	0	964	41	0	2.55	.907

== Awards and honours ==
Award	Year	Ref
WHL
WHL East First All-Star Team	2002	
CHL First Team All-Star		
Del Wilson Trophy	2002, 2004	
Four Broncos Memorial Trophy	2004	
AHL
AHL All-Rookie Team	2005	
NHL
Stanley Cup champion	2006	
Conn Smythe Trophy	2006	
NHL All-Star Game	2011	

== See also ==
- List of goaltenders who have scored a goal in an NHL game
- List of NHL goaltenders with 300 wins

Awards and achievements
Preceded by Dan Blackburn; Josh Harding	Winner of the Del Wilson Trophy; 2002; 2004	Succeeded by Josh Harding; Jeff Glass
Preceded by Josh Harding	Winner of the Four Broncos Memorial Trophy; 2004	Succeeded by Eric Fehr
Preceded by Brad Richards	Winner of the Conn Smythe Trophy; 2006	Succeeded by Scott Niedermayer
Preceded by Igor Knyazev	Carolina Hurricanes first-round draft pick 2002	Succeeded by Eric Staal
