= David Tanabe =

American ice hockey player (born 1980)

- Born: July 19, 1980 (age 46) White Bear Lake, Minnesota, U.S.
- Height: 6 ft 1 in (185 cm)
- Weight: 212 lb (96 kg; 15 st 2 lb)
- Position: Defense
- Shot: Left
- Played for: NHL; Carolina Hurricanes; Boston Bruins; Phoenix Coyotes; Swiss; Rapperswil-Jona Lakers; Kloten Flyers
- National team: United States
- NHL draft: 16th overall, 1999; Carolina Hurricanes
- Playing career: 1999–2008

David Michael Tanabe (born July 19, 1980) is an American former professional ice hockey defenseman. Tanabe was drafted in the first round, 16th overall, by the Carolina Hurricanes in the 1999 NHL entry draft. After being forced into early retirement due to an injury, he now works for the USA Hockey National Team Development Program.

== Playing career ==
Tanabe was in the first group of US high school hockey players to train in Ann Arbor, Michigan at the Cube, site of the National Team Development Program. After graduating from high school in Ann Arbor in 1998, Tanabe played one year of Division 1 Hockey for the University of Wisconsin–Madison, Wisconsin. Tanabe was drafted 16th overall by the Carolina Hurricanes in the 1999 NHL entry draft becoming the first graduate of the National Team Development Program to be drafted in the first round. During his first NHL game on October 11, 1999, Tanabe scored his first goal during a power play against the Calgary Flames.

On August 5, 2006 the Boston Bruins decided to "walk-away" from a contract of $1.275 million that was awarded to Tanabe by an arbitrator on August 3, 2006. Under NHL rules Tanabe became an immediate unrestricted free agent. On August 29, 2006, Tanabe was signed by the Hurricanes. In December 2007, Tanabe suffered a concussion against the Toronto Maple Leafs. On October 18, 2008, the Hurricanes reached a settlement with Tanabe on the last year of his contract, at which time his agent stated that Tanabe had been advised by his doctor to not play hockey again.

== Career statistics ==
=== Regular season and playoffs ===
| | | | Regular season | | | | | Playoffs |
| Season | Team | League | GP | G | A | Pts | PIM | GP | G | A | Pts | PIM |
|---|---|---|---|---|---|---|---|---|---|---|---|---|
| 1996–97 | Hill–Murray School | HSMN | 28 | 12 | 14 | 26 | | — | — | — | — | — |
| 1997–98 | U.S. NTDP Juniors | USHL | 21 | 1 | 3 | 4 | 18 | — | — | — | — | — |
| 1997–98 | U.S. NTDP U18 | NAHL | 12 | 1 | 2 | 3 | 10 | — | — | — | — | — |
| 1998–99 | University of Wisconsin | WCHA | 35 | 10 | 12 | 22 | 44 | — | — | — | — | — |
| 1999–2000 | Cincinnati Cyclones | IHL | 32 | 0 | 13 | 13 | 14 | 11 | 1 | 4 | 5 | 6 |
| 1999–2000 | Carolina Hurricanes | NHL | 31 | 4 | 0 | 4 | 14 | — | — | — | — | — |
| 2000–01 | Carolina Hurricanes | NHL | 74 | 7 | 22 | 29 | 42 | 6 | 2 | 0 | 2 | 12 |
| 2001–02 | Carolina Hurricanes | NHL | 78 | 1 | 15 | 16 | 35 | 1 | 0 | 1 | 1 | 0 |
| 2002–03 | Carolina Hurricanes | NHL | 68 | 3 | 10 | 13 | 24 | — | — | — | — | — |
| 2003–04 | Phoenix Coyotes | NHL | 45 | 5 | 7 | 12 | 22 | — | — | — | — | — |
| 2004–05 | Rapperswil–Jona Lakers | NLA | 8 | 4 | 5 | 9 | 4 | — | — | — | — | — |
| 2004–05 | Kloten Flyers | NLA | 20 | 3 | 7 | 10 | 18 | — | — | — | — | — |
| 2005–06 | Phoenix Coyotes | NHL | 21 | 0 | 4 | 4 | 8 | — | — | — | — | — |
| 2005–06 | Boston Bruins | NHL | 54 | 4 | 12 | 16 | 48 | — | — | — | — | — |
| 2006–07 | Carolina Hurricanes | NHL | 60 | 5 | 12 | 17 | 44 | — | — | — | — | — |
| 2007–08 | Carolina Hurricanes | NHL | 18 | 1 | 2 | 3 | 8 | — | — | — | — | — |
| NHL totals | | | 449 | 30 | 84 | 114 | 245 | 7 | 2 | 1 | 3 | 12 |

=== International ===
| Year | Team | Event | GP | G | A | Pts | PIM |
|---|---|---|---|---|---|---|---|
| 1999 | United States | WJC | 6 | 0 | 1 | 1 | 4 |
| 2001 | United States | WC | 9 | 1 | 2 | 3 | 6 |
| Senior totals | | | 9 | 1 | 2 | 3 | 6 |

== Awards and honors ==
| Award | Year |
|---|---|
| All-WCHA Rookie Team | 1998–99 |

Sporting positions
| Preceded by Jeff Heerema | Carolina Hurricanes first-round draft pick 1999 | Succeeded by Igor Knyazev |
