= Igor Knyazev =

Russian ice hockey player (born 1983)

- Born: 27 January 1983 (age 43) Elektrostal, Soviet Union
- Height: 6 ft 0 in (183 cm)
- Weight: 185 lb (84 kg; 13 st 3 lb)
- Position: Defence
- Shot: Left
- team Former teams: free agent Spartak Moscow; Ak Bars Kazan; Khimik Voskresensk; Khimik Moscow Oblast; Dynamo Moscow; Vityaz Chekhov; HC MVD
- NHL draft: 15th overall, 2001; Carolina Hurricanes
- Playing career: 1999–2013

Igor Knyazev (born 27 January 1983) is a Russian former professional ice hockey defenceman. Knyazev was drafted in the first-round, 15th overall by the Carolina Hurricanes in the 2001 NHL entry draft. He spent two seasons in the American Hockey League with the Lowell Lock Monsters and the Springfield Falcons before returning to the Russian Super League in 2004.

== Career statistics ==
=== Regular season and playoffs ===
			Regular season					Playoffs
Season	Team	League	GP	G	A	Pts	PIM	GP	G	A	Pts	PIM
1999–2000	Spartak–2 Moscow	RUS.3	13	2	4	6	74	—	—	—	—	—
1999–2000	Spartak Moscow	RUS.2	26	1	1	2	16	—	—	—	—	—
2000–01	Spartak Moscow	RUS.2	42	6	3	9	64	11	0	2	2	37
2001–02	Spartak Moscow	RSL	3	0	0	0	8	—	—	—	—	—
2001–02	Spartak–2 Moscow	RUS.3	53	6	5	11	101	—	—	—	—	—
2001–02	Ak Bars Kazan	RSL	16	0	1	1	4	3	0	0	0	0
2002–03	Lowell Lock Monsters	AHL	68	2	5	7	68	—	—	—	—	—
2003–04	Springfield Falcons	AHL	72	1	6	7	61	—	—	—	—	—
2004–05	Khimik Voskresensk	RSL	29	0	2	2	57	—	—	—	—	—
2005–06	Khimik Moscow Oblast	RSL	21	3	1	4	36	—	—	—	—	—
2005–06	Kristall Elektrostal	RUS.3	3	0	0	0	2	—	—	—	—	—
2006–07	Dynamo Moscow	RSL	14	0	2	2	22	—	—	—	—	—
2006–07	Dynamo–2 Moscow	RUS.3	2	2	1	3	8	—	—	—	—	—
2006–07	Vityaz Chekhov	RSL	12	0	0	0	82	3	0	0	0	2
2006–07	Vityaz–2 Chekhov	RUS.3	11	2	1	3	12	—	—	—	—	—
2007–08	HC MVD	RSL	8	0	1	1	6	3	0	2	2	2
2007–08	HC MVD–2	RUS.3	28	4	12	16	81	—	—	—	—	—
2008–09	HC MVD	KHL	8	0	1	1	8	—	—	—	—	—
2008–09	HC MVD–2	RUS.3	13	3	5	8	14	—	—	—	—	—
2008–09	Krylya Sovetov Moscow	RUS.2	10	0	2	2	40	—	—	—	—	—
2008–09	Krylya Sovetov–2 Moscow	RUS.3	9	1	1	2	14	—	—	—	—	—
2009–10	SK Kadaň	CZE.2	18	0	1	1	32	—	—	—	—	—
2009–10	KLH Vajgar Jindřichův Hradec	CZE.3	2	0	1	1	12	—	—	—	—	—
2009–10	Krylya Sovetov Moscow	RUS.2	17	0	0	0	20	5	1	1	2	0
2009–10	Krylia Stolitsy Moscow	RUS.3	6	0	3	3	12	—	—	—	—	—
2010–11	Lada Togliatti	VHL	43	0	6	6	78	—	—	—	—	—
2011–12	Titan Klin	VHL	52	5	4	9	60	3	0	0	0	27
2012–13	Titan Klin	VHL	8	0	1	1	2	—	—	—	—	—
2012–13	HC Ryazan	VHL	11	1	2	3	37	—	—	—	—	—
2012–13	THK Tver	VHL	29	2	0	2	130	—	—	—	—	—
RSL totals			103	3	8	11	215	9	0	2	2	4
RUS.2 & VHL totals			238	15	18	33	447	19	1	3	4	64
RUS.3 totals			85	14	27	41	217	—	—	—	—	—

=== International ===
Year	Team	Event	Result	GP	G	A	Pts	PIM
2000	Russia	U17	1st place, gold medalist(s)	6	0	1	1	4
2000	Russia	WJC18	2nd place, silver medalist(s)	6	0	1	1	4
2001	Russia	WJC18	1st place, gold medalist(s)	6	1	4	5	24
2002	Russia	WJC	1st place, gold medalist(s)	7	2	1	3	35
Junior totals				25	3	7	10	67

Preceded by David Tanabe	Carolina Hurricanes first-round draft pick 2001	Succeeded by Cam Ward
