= Ryan Murphy (ice hockey, born 1993) =

Canadian ice hockey player (born 1993)

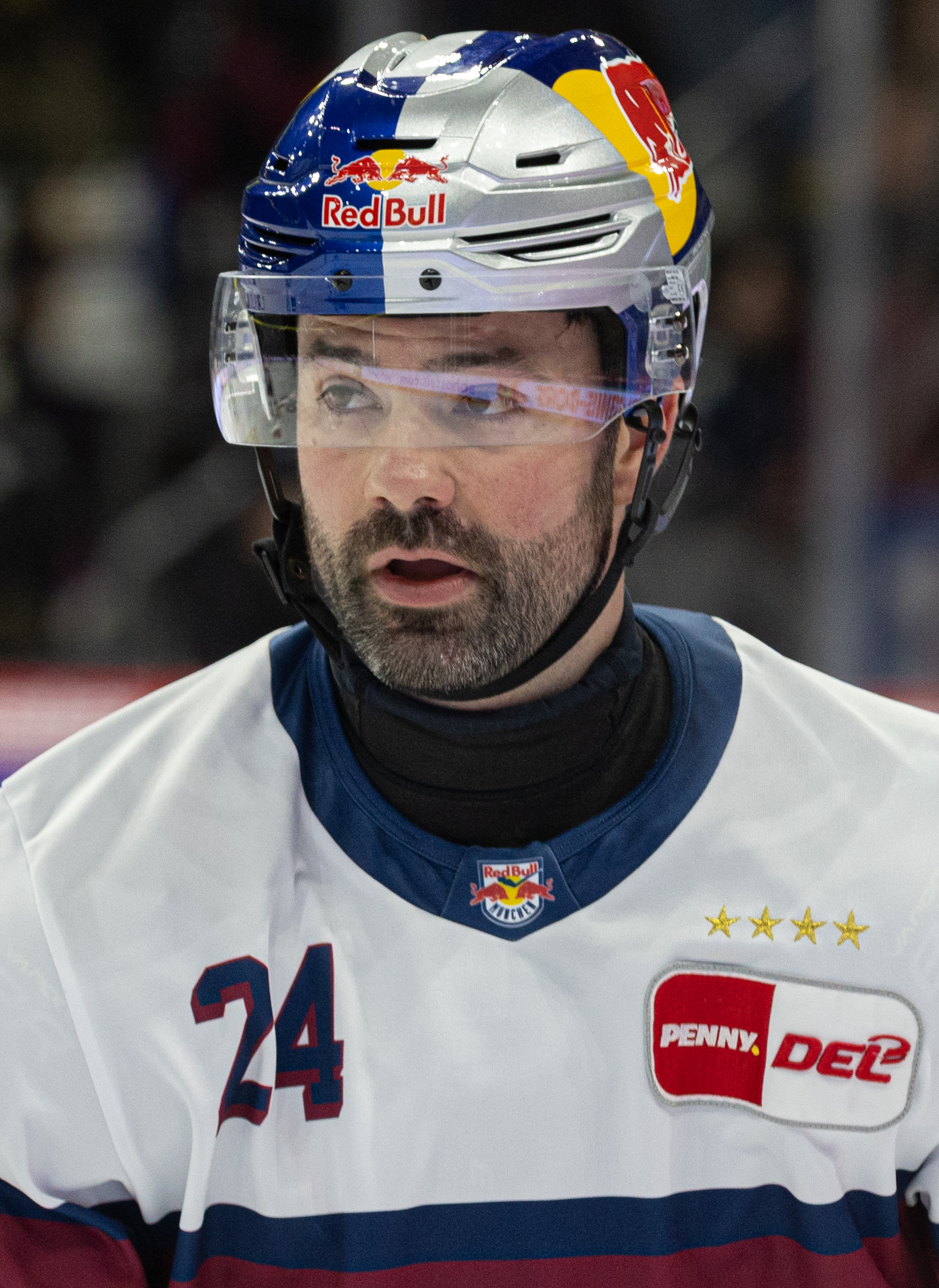
- Murphy with the EHC München in 2025
- Born: March 31, 1993 (age 33) Aurora, Ontario, Canada
- Height: 5 ft 11 in (180 cm)
- Weight: 181 lb (82 kg; 12 st 13 lb)
- Position: Defence
- Shoots: Right
- DEL team Former teams: EHC München; Carolina Hurricanes; Minnesota Wild; New Jersey Devils; Neftekhimik Nizhnekamsk; Dinamo Minsk; Salavat Yulaev Ufa; EC Red Bull Salzburg
- NHL draft: 12th overall, 2011; Carolina Hurricanes
- Playing career: 2013–present

Ryan Murphy (born March 31, 1993) is a Canadian professional ice hockey defenceman currently playing with EHC Red Bull München in the Deutsche Eishockey Liga (DEL). He was originally drafted in the first round, 12th overall, by the Carolina Hurricanes during the 2011 NHL entry draft.

== Playing career ==
Murphy was selected by the Kitchener Rangers third overall in the 2009 Ontario Hockey League (OHL) Bantam Draft. He began his first season as a 16-year-old and led the OHL in rookie defencemen scoring, scoring 39 points in 62 games playing on a defensive pairing with Columbus Blue Jackets first-rounder John Moore. He followed up his stellar rookie campaign by helping the Rangers proceed to the third round of the OHL playoffs with 17 points in 20 games, leading the Rangers in defence scoring.

Murphy broke out his sophomore season, leading the OHL in defencemen goal scoring with 26 goals. He added to that with 53 assists for 79 points in 63 games, good enough for second in OHL in defencemen scoring behind Windsor Spitfires defenceman Ryan Ellis.

Murphy was named to the OHL First Team All-Star team for the 2010–11 season. On June 24, 2011, Murphy was drafted 12th overall by the Carolina Hurricanes in the NHL Entry Draft, reuniting with former Kitchener Rangers teammate Jeff Skinner. On September 16, 2011, Murphy signed a three-year, entry-level contract with the Hurricanes.

When the Hurricanes' final 23-man roster was released on October 5, 2011, Murphy was on it, and he began the 2011–12 season in the NHL. On October 13, the Hurricanes returned Murphy to his OHL team, the Kitchener Rangers. Murphy suffered a severe concussion on November 4, during a game against the Niagara IceDogs. Consequently, he was placed in "complete shutdown mode" by the Rangers.

On September 18, 2012, Murphy was named captain of the Kitchener Rangers. During the 2012–13 season, on February 21, 2013, Murphy made his NHL debut with the Carolina Hurricanes. He made the Hurricanes' opening night roster for the 2013–14 season. On October 6, 2013, he scored his first career NHL point, assisting on a Jay Harrison goal.

On June 29, 2017, Murphy (along with goaltender Eddie Läck and a seventh-round draft pick) was traded to the Calgary Flames in exchange for prospect Keegan Kanzig and a sixth-round pick in the 2019 NHL entry draft. The following day, on June 30, the Flames announced Murphy was placed on unconditional waivers to buy-out the remaining year of his contract. The following day, on July 1, Murphy signed as a free agent to a one-year, two-way contract with the Minnesota Wild.

During the 2018–19 season, on January 30, 2019, the Wild traded Murphy to the New Jersey Devils in exchange for Michael Kapla. Assigned to AHL affiliate, the Binghamton Devils, Murphy appeared in 2 games before he was recalled to New Jersey on February 9, 2019. In his Devils debut, Murphy had a primary assist on a Pavel Zacha opening goal, helping the Devils to a 3–2 victory over former club, the Carolina Hurricanes, on February 10, 2019. He was returned to the AHL the following day. On June 25, 2019, Murphy was not tendered a qualifying offer to remain with the Devils, making him a free agent.

With his NHL prospects dwindling, Murphy opted to move his career abroad, agreeing to a one-year contract with Russian club HC Neftekhimik Nizhnekamsk of the Kontinental Hockey League (KHL), on July 27, 2019. In his lone season in Russia with Nizhnekamsk in the 2019–20 season, Murphy recorded 8 goals and 23 points in 56 regular season games. He made 4 playoff appearances, going scoreless in a series sweep defeat to Ak Bars Kazan.

A free agent, Murphy opted to return to North America, agreeing to a one-year AHL contract with the newly founded Henderson Silver Knights, affiliate of the Vegas Golden Knights, on August 14, 2020. With the 2020–21 season delayed due to the COVID-19 pandemic, in order to stay in shape Murphy returned to the KHL on loan from the Silver Knights, agreeing to a stint with Belarusian club HC Dinamo Minsk on November 14, 2020. He made 12 appearances on the blueline with Minsk, adding 8 points, before he was returned to the Silver Knights on December 27, 2020.

Following a successful season with the Silver Knights, Murphy secured a one-year, two-way contract with the Detroit Red Wings on July 28, 2021. He played the 2021–22 season exclusively with the Red Wings' AHL affiliate, the Grand Rapids Griffins.

A free agent from the Red Wings, Murphy opted to return to the Russian KHL, securing a one-year contract with Salavat Yulaev Ufa on June 29, 2022.

== International play ==
Murphy was cut from the Canadian 2010 Ivan Hlinka Memorial Tournament team despite a great performance during the tryout camp. Murphy would later be selected to the Canadian world junior camp in December, where he was one of the final cuts.

During the World Under-18s in April 2011, Murphy had an impressive tournament, scoring 13 points and leading the tournament in defencemen scoring, as well as leading Canada to a fourth-place finish as their leading scorer. He was named Defenceman of the Tournament. On the back of his performance, Murphy was invited to take part in Canada's 2011 national junior team selection camp

Murphy was named to Team Canada in his final year of eligibility for the 2013 World Junior Ice Hockey Championships. It was Murphy's third time trying out for Canada's national U20 team.

== Career statistics ==
=== Regular season and playoffs ===
			Regular season					Playoffs
Season	Team	League	GP	G	A	Pts	PIM	GP	G	A	Pts	PIM
2008–09	Villanova Knights	OJHL	4	4	2	6	0	—	—	—	—	—
2009–10	Kitchener Rangers	OHL	62	6	33	39	22	20	5	12	17	16
2010–11	Kitchener Rangers	OHL	63	26	53	79	36	7	2	9	11	8
2011–12	Kitchener Rangers	OHL	49	11	43	54	30	16	2	20	22	12
2012–13	Carolina Hurricanes	NHL	4	0	0	0	2	—	—	—	—	—
2012–13	Kitchener Rangers	OHL	54	10	38	48	34	10	3	4	7	8
2012–13	Charlotte Checkers	AHL	3	0	2	2	0	5	0	2	2	2
2013–14	Carolina Hurricanes	NHL	48	2	10	12	10	—	—	—	—	—
2013–14	Charlotte Checkers	AHL	22	3	19	22	8	—	—	—	—	—
2014–15	Carolina Hurricanes	NHL	37	4	9	13	8	—	—	—	—	—
2014–15	Charlotte Checkers	AHL	25	0	17	17	10	—	—	—	—	—
2015–16	Carolina Hurricanes	NHL	35	0	10	10	10	—	—	—	—	—
2015–16	Charlotte Checkers	AHL	32	7	17	24	18	—	—	—	—	—
2016–17	Carolina Hurricanes	NHL	27	0	2	2	8	—	—	—	—	—
2016–17	Charlotte Checkers	AHL	7	0	1	1	4	—	—	—	—	—
2017–18	Iowa Wild	AHL	48	4	24	28	30	—	—	—	—	—
2017–18	Minnesota Wild	NHL	21	2	3	5	16	1	0	0	0	0
2018–19	Iowa Wild	AHL	35	3	12	15	12	—	—	—	—	—
2018–19	Minnesota Wild	NHL	2	0	0	0	0	—	—	—	—	—
2018–19	Binghamton Devils	AHL	23	0	10	10	8	—	—	—	—	—
2018–19	New Jersey Devils	NHL	1	0	1	1	0	—	—	—	—	—
2019–20	Neftekhimik Nizhnekamsk	KHL	56	8	15	23	22	4	0	0	0	2
2020–21	HC Dinamo Minsk	KHL	12	2	6	8	6	—	—	—	—	—
2020–21	Henderson Silver Knights	AHL	37	5	22	27	32	3	0	1	1	6
2021–22	Grand Rapids Griffins	AHL	53	11	18	29	30	—	—	—	—	—
2022–23	Salavat Yulaev Ufa	KHL	43	4	13	17	35	6	0	1	1	4
2023–24	EC Red Bull Salzburg	ICEHL	40	9	20	29	26	19	1	9	10	33
2024–25	EC Red Bull Salzburg	ICEHL	42	8	35	43	8	11	0	7	7	2
2025–26	EHC München	DEL	47	9	29	38	12	8	0	5	5	0
NHL totals			175	8	35	43	54	1	0	0	0	0
KHL totals			111	14	34	48	63	10	0	1	1	6

=== International ===
Year	Team	Event	Result	GP	G	A	Pts	PIM
2010	Canada Ontario	U17	2nd place, silver medalist(s)	6	1	3	4	4
2011	Canada	U18	4th	7	4	9	13	2
2013	Canada	WJC	4th	6	1	2	3	0
Junior totals				19	6	14	20	6

== Awards and honours ==
Award	Year
OHL
First All-Rookie Team	2009–10
CHL Top Prospects Game	2010–11
First All-Star Team	2010–11
Second All-Star Team	2011–12, 2012–13
AHL
All-Star Game	2015
Pacific Division All-Star Team	2020–21
Eddie Shore Award	2020–21

Awards and achievements
Preceded by Jeff Skinner	Carolina Hurricanes first-round draft pick 2011	Succeeded by Elias Lindholm
Sporting positions
Preceded by Patrick Brown	Henderson Silver Knights captain 2021	Succeeded by Brayden Pachal
