= Jack Johnson (ice hockey) =

American ice hockey player (born 1987)

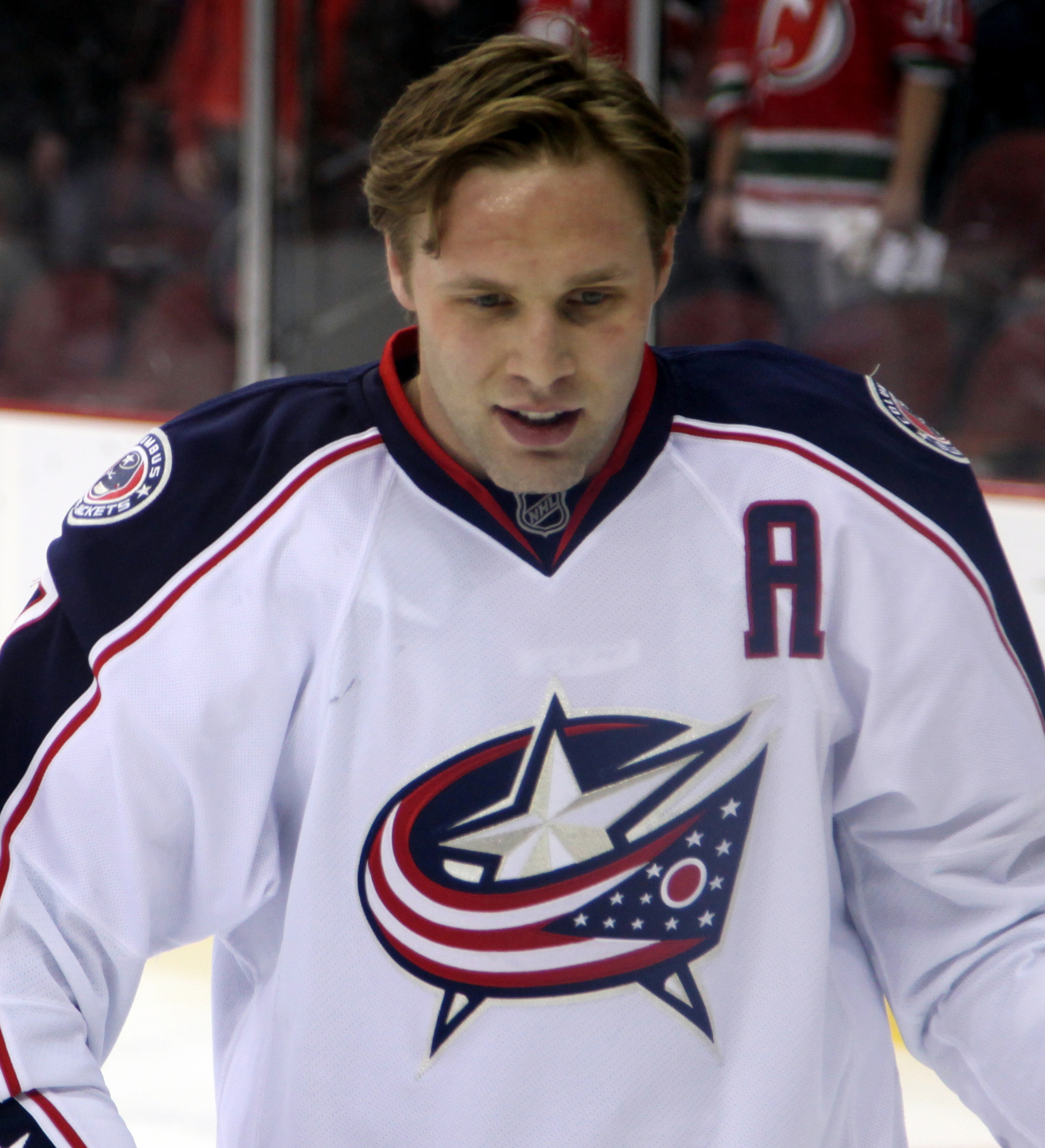
- Johnson with the Columbus Blue Jackets in 2013
- Born: January 13, 1987 (age 39) Indianapolis, Indiana, U.S.
- Height: 6 ft 1 in (185 cm)
- Weight: 227 lb (103 kg; 16 st 3 lb)
- Position: Defense
- Shot: Left
- Played for: Los Angeles Kings; Columbus Blue Jackets; Pittsburgh Penguins; New York Rangers; Colorado Avalanche; Chicago Blackhawks
- National team: United States
- NHL draft: 3rd overall, 2005; Carolina Hurricanes
- Playing career: 2007–2025

John Joseph Louis Johnson III (born January 13, 1987) is an American former professional ice hockey player. A defenseman, he played 19 seasons in the National Hockey League (NHL) for the Los Angeles Kings, Columbus Blue Jackets, Pittsburgh Penguins, New York Rangers, Colorado Avalanche and Chicago Blackhawks. In his prime, he was regarded as a two-way defenseman, combining physical prowess and offensive capability. Johnson won the Stanley Cup with the Avalanche in 2022.

Following two years with the USA Hockey National Team Development Program, Johnson was selected third overall by the Carolina Hurricanes in the 2005 NHL entry draft. After a year at the University of Michigan, his rights were traded to the Los Angeles Kings. He played another year at Michigan before signing his first professional contract with the Kings. In February 2012, he was traded to the Columbus Blue Jackets after five seasons in Los Angeles. In 2018, he signed with the Pittsburgh Penguins in free agency. But after two disappointing campaigns, he was bought out by the Penguins. He signed a one-year contract with the Rangers. Johnson has represented the United States on the international stage multiple times, most notably playing winning a silver medal at the 2010 Winter Olympics in Vancouver.

== Playing career ==
=== Amateur ===
Johnson's family moved to Bloomfield Hills, Michigan from Indianapolis shortly after he was born. He grew up playing for Little Caesar's in minor hockey. Johnson transferred to Shattuck-Saint Mary's Boarding School in Faribault, Minnesota before his eighth-grade year. As a sophomore during the 2002–03 hockey season, Johnson scored 15 goals and 27 assists as he helped the school's Midget Major AAA team win the U.S. National Championship along with current NHL player and former teammate Sidney Crosby.

Johnson was drafted by the Carolina Hurricanes in the first round, third overall, in the 2005 NHL entry draft from the Team USA under-18 national team, but did not immediately jump to the NHL, instead playing for the University of Michigan in the Central Collegiate Hockey Association (CCHA). In his freshman season, Johnson set school records for points (32) and penalty minutes (149) by a freshman defenseman. After his freshman season, however, with the Hurricanes needing a defenseman and Johnson having committed to another collegiate season (the Hurricanes had tried to sign him after his freshman season ended), his rights were traded on September 29, 2006, along with Oleg Tverdovsky, to the Los Angeles Kings in exchange for Tim Gleason and Éric Bélanger.

After his rights were traded, Johnson played one more season for the Wolverines, setting the school record for the most goals (16) by a sophomore defenseman in a single season and was named the CCHA Offensive Defenseman of the Year.

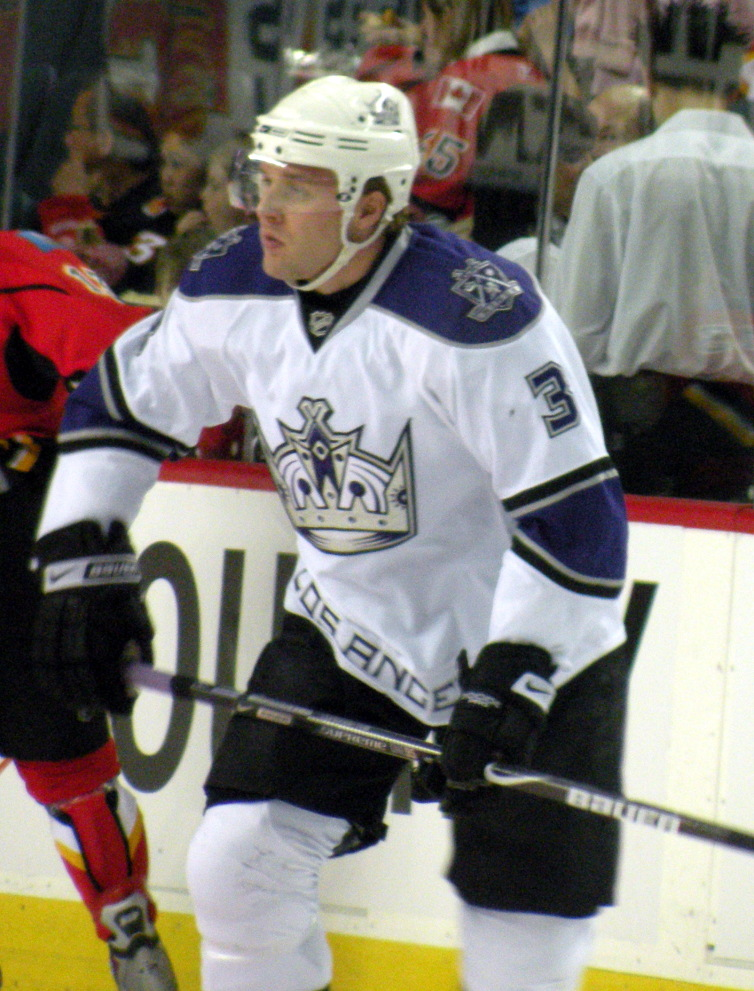
Johnson with the Los Angeles Kings in April 2009

=== Professional ===
==== Los Angeles Kings ====
After Michigan lost in the West Regional Semi-finals of the 2007 NCAA Tournament, rather than return to Michigan and finish the semester, Johnson jumped to the NHL and signed his entry-level contract with the Kings in March 2007, making his NHL debut on March 29 against the Vancouver Canucks. He played five games on the season, recording 18 penalty minutes and no points. Johnson recorded his first NHL point on October 10, 2007, assisting a Kyle Calder goal in a loss to the Dallas Stars. His first goal came on October 19, 2007, against goaltender Roberto Luongo of the Vancouver Canucks. Johnson scored three goals and eight assists that season.

Early in the 2008–09 season, Johnson suffered a shoulder injury that required surgery and missed 41 games.

During the 2009–10 season, Johnson greatly improved his game, scoring eight goals and 28 assists, second only to Drew Doughty in defensive scoring for the Kings. His play earned him a selection to the Team USA at the 2010 Olympics, along with Kings' captain Dustin Brown; the two eventually won the silver medal.

On January 8, 2011, Johnson signed a seven-year extension with the Kings. At the time of the deal, Johnson led all Kings' defensemen in points scored with four goals and 24 assists. The contract carried an annual $4.3 million salary cap hit. He ended the 2010–11 season with a career-high 42 points, ranking sixth among all Kings skaters. His 2011–12 season with the Kings, however, was a tough one, as he failed to score at the pace he set in the previous season, recording only 24 points in 61 games by February 12, 2012.

==== Columbus Blue Jackets ====
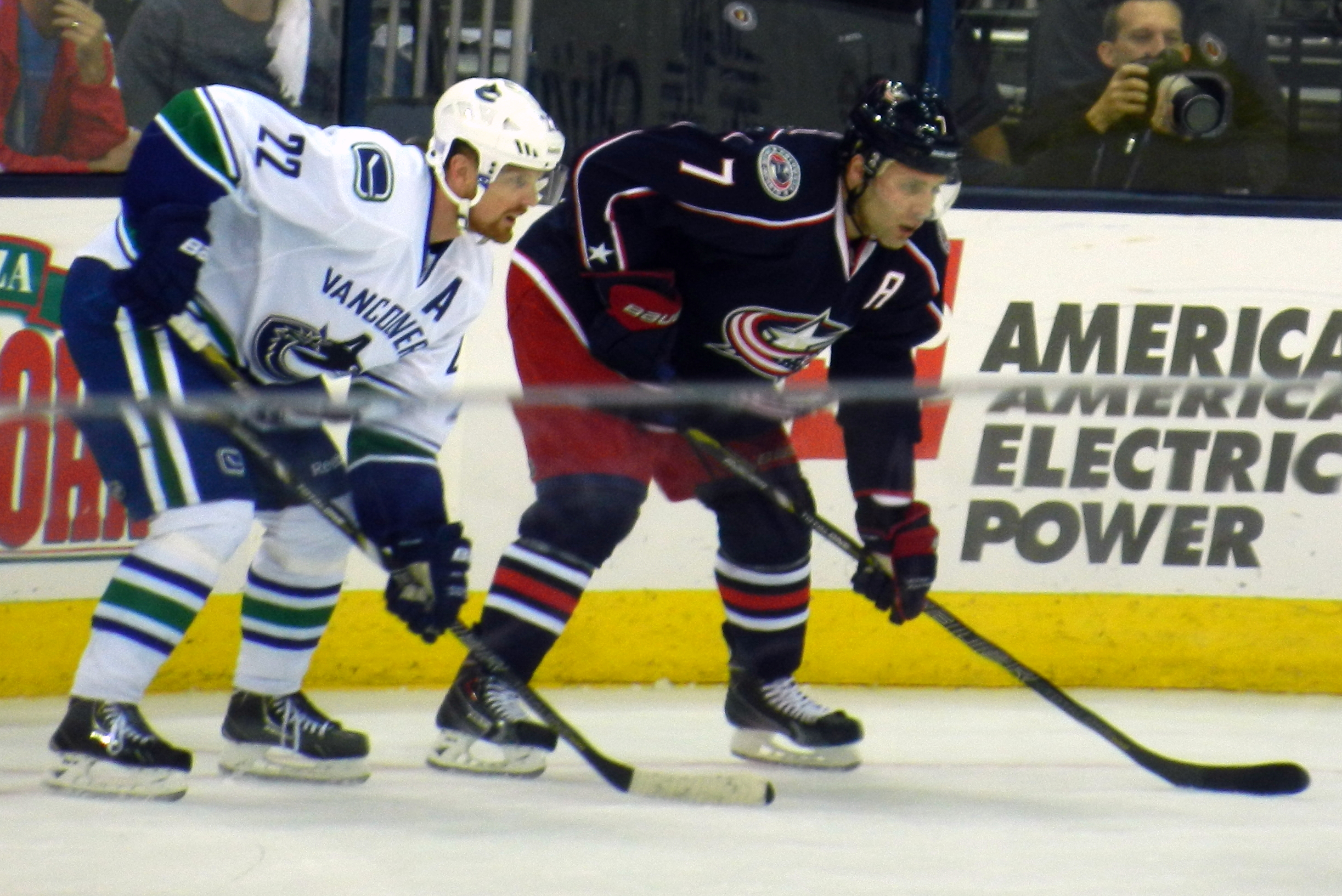
Johnson (right) lining up for a faceoff against Daniel Sedin in October 2013

On February 23, 2012, Johnson was traded by the Kings to the Columbus Blue Jackets, along with a conditional first-round draft pick (Marko Daňo), in exchange for Jeff Carter. Upon arriving in Columbus, Johnson took the jersey number 7, which had previously been worn by Carter. During a March 8 game against his former team, the Kings, the Blue Jackets offered their fans a one night offer to have their Carter jersey nameplates changed to "J. Johnson" nameplates for free. Playing in 21 games for the Jackets after his trade, he recorded four goals and ten assists, for a total of 14 points. Johnson declared that he had no hard feelings in leaving Los Angeles, given that "people [in Columbus] accepting me with such open arms," and "I was looking forward to my new opportunity and getting the chance to play and be myself in Columbus." Johnson added that he did not follow the Kings' subsequent run to win the Stanley Cup, as he was in Finland playing for Team USA at the 2012 IIHF World Championship.

With the 2012–13 NHL lockout halting play to start the year, Johnson spent the lockout training so he would be in the top shape once the game returned. In the shortened 2012–13 season, Johnson was one of the Blue Jackets' alternate captains, and was considered the de facto leader of the team as Columbus nearly qualified for the 2013 playoffs. He scored one of his team's goals in the season closer against the Nashville Predators, and broke the Blue Jackets record for most ice time in regulation, nearing 35 minutes in a game against the Detroit Red Wings, which was also the individual record for the season. After his impressive showing of both on-ice skill and leadership, Johnson was considered a front-runner to become Columbus' first full-fledged captain since Rick Nash, though the Blue Jackets ultimately named Nick Foligno as the team's next captain.

Johnson struggled during the first half of the 2013–14 season, with only 11 points in 43 games by January, a factor in the decision to not include Johnson on Team USA for the 2014 Winter Olympics in Sochi despite being considered by many to be a lock for the team. His play improved in the new year, however, and Johnson scored 22 points in the 39 remaining games to finish the year with five goals and 33 points and help the Blue Jackets clinch their first playoff berth since 2009. The Blue Jackets lost to the Pittsburgh Penguins in the first round of the playoffs. Johnson led all Blue Jackets players in playoff scoring, with three goals and seven points in the six-game series, including two assists in a narrow 4–3 loss on home ice that knocked the Blue Jackets out of the playoffs.

On January 13, 2018, it was reported that Johnson requested a trade from the Jackets, citing a reduced role as well as a desire to better position himself as a free agent in the summer. Despite his earlier trade request, Johnson remained a member of the Blue Jackets after the trade deadline had passed on February 26.

==== Pittsburgh Penguins ====
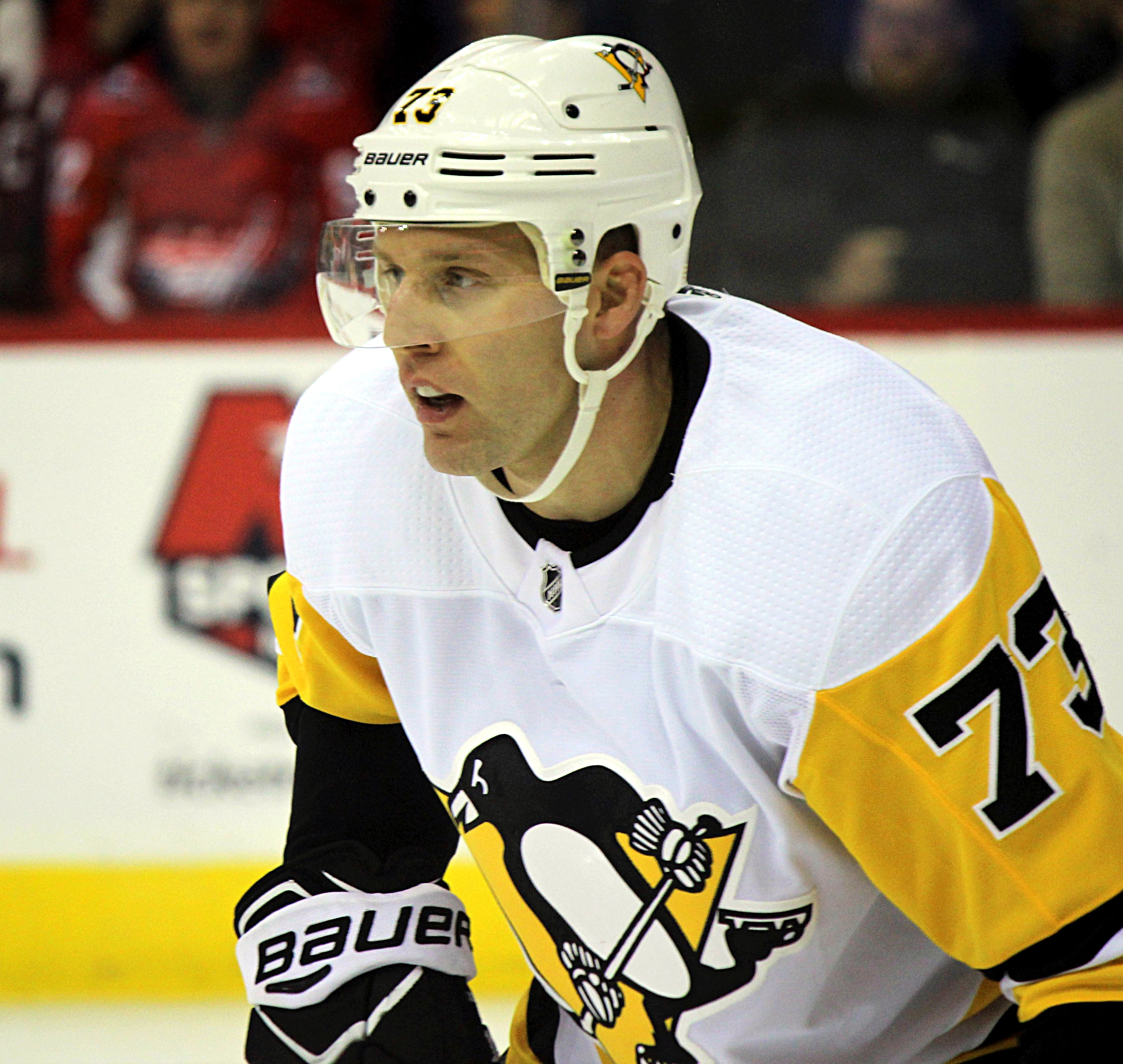
Johnson with the Penguins in 2018.

On June 27, 2018, it was reported that the Pittsburgh Penguins were interested in signing him in the free agency period. Johnson's signing was made official by the Penguins on July 1, 2018, announcing a five-year, $16.25 million agreement. Johnson wore number 73 for the Penguins as veteran Matt Cullen wore his usual number 7. For the 2019–20 season, Johnson again changed his number from 73 to the number 3 following the departure of Olli Määttä, who had previously worn that number.

On October 5, 2020, the Penguins placed Johnson on unconditional waivers for the purpose of buying out the remaining three years on his contract. The following day, Johnson cleared waivers, making him a free agent.

==== New York Rangers ====
On October 9, 2020, Johnson signed a one-year, $1.15 million contract with the New York Rangers. Johnson appeared in 13 games with the Rangers during the 2021 NHL season before it was announced on March 20, 2021, that he would undergo a core muscle repair surgery, effectively ending his season.

==== Colorado Avalanche ====
As an unrestricted free agent (UFA) heading into the 2021–22 NHL campaign, Johnson was invited to the Colorado Avalanche 2021 training camp on a professional tryout (PTO) contract on September 1, 2021. After participating in training camp and appearing in 5 out of 6 pre-season games with the Avalanche, Johnson made the club's final roster to open the 2021–22 season, securing a one-year, $750,000 contract, on October 10, 2021. On October 13, 2021, Johnson scored the Avalanche's first goal of the 2021–22 season against the Chicago Blackhawks. On March 1, 2022, Johnson played his 1000th NHL Game. The Avalanche finished second in the league in the regular season, and Johnson played all but eight of the Avalanche's games in the regular season.

With Bowen Byram having returned from injury and newly acquired Josh Manson having passed Johnson on the depth chart, however, Johnson was first a healthy scratch in the postseason. He did not participate in the first-round sweep of the Nashville Predators, nor was he active in the first three games of the second round against the St. Louis Blues. A season-ending sternum injury to Sam Girard in game three, however, elevated Johnson to the active roster once again. He went on to play all 13 games needed before the Avalanche won the Stanley Cup, finishing the Blues in three more games, sweeping the Edmonton Oilers and defeating the Tampa Bay Lightning in six games.

==== Chicago Blackhawks ====
After winning the Stanley Cup as a member of the Avalanche, Johnson left as a free agent to sign a one-year, $950,000 contract with the Chicago Blackhawks on August 17, 2022. Johnson made his Blackhawks debut on opening night of the 2022–23 season against the Avalanche, joining his former club in the raising of the Stanley Cup banner and appearing on ice for the ceremony on October 12, 2022. Deployed in an elevated top-four pairing role with the rebuilding Blackhawks, Johnson registered his first point with Chicago, assisting on a Sam Lafferty goal, in a 5–2 victory over the San Jose Sharks on October 15, 2022. Adding a veteran presence, Johnson added 4 assists through 58 regular season games.

==== Return to Colorado ====
Approaching the trade deadline, Johnson returned to the Avalanche for a second stint, after a trade with the Blackhawks in exchange for Andreas Englund on February 26, 2023.

As a free agent, Johnson opted to continue his tenure with the Avalanche, re-signing to a one-year, $775,000 contract extension on July 2, 2023.

==== Return to Columbus ====
A free agent at the end of the 2023–24 season, Johnson signed a one-year, $775,000 contract to return for a second stint with the Columbus Blue Jackets on July 2, 2024. In the following 2024–25 season, Johnson was used in a rotational bottom pairing role, registering 6 assists through 41 regular season games.

==== Retirement ====
As a free agent from the Blue Jackets and aspiring to extend his professional career, Johnson went un-signed over the summer. Approaching the 2025–26 season, Johnson accepted an invitation from the Minnesota Wild to attend training camp on a professional tryout on August 11, 2025. Johnson was released by the Wild on October 3. Three months later, on January 5, 2026, Johnson was hired as a professional scout by the Vancouver Canucks, ending his playing career.

== International play ==
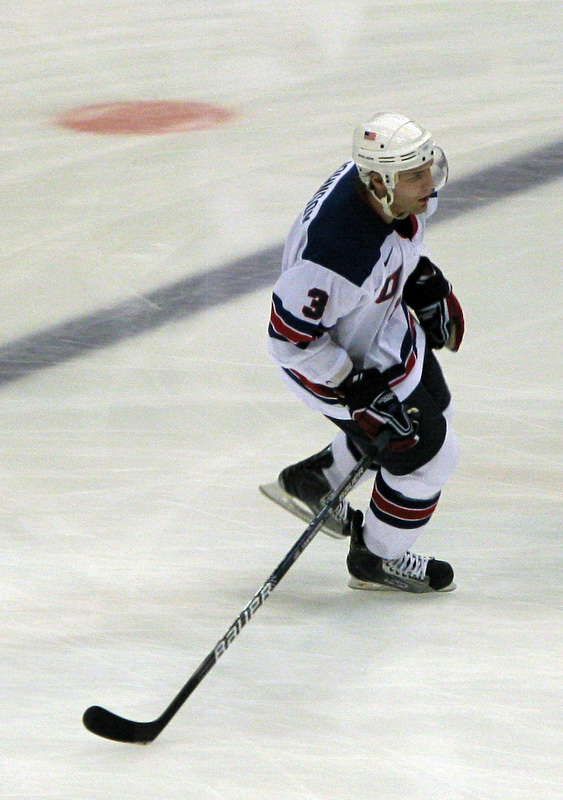
- Johnson warming up before the preliminary round game against Canada at the 2010 Winter Olympics

Medal record

Representing United States

Olympic Games
Silver medal – second place	2010 Vancouver	

World Junior Championships
Bronze medal – third place	2007 Sweden	

World U18 Championships
Gold medal – first place	2005 Czech Republic	
Silver medal – second place	2004 Belarus	

Johnson was first selected to the United States junior team at the 2004 IIHF World Championship. Despite failing to medal in the 2006 World Junior Championships, he was selected to the All-Star Team of the Tournament.

Johnson was named to his first Olympic team on January 1, 2010. Johnson marched on behalf of the United States Olympic team in the opening ceremony in Vancouver on February 12, 2010, being the first American-born NHL player to march in the Olympic opening ceremony. In six games with Team USA, Johnson collected one assist and helped claim a silver medal. In the following 2010 IIHF World Championship, he was selected and named as captain of Team USA.

== Personal life and legal issues ==
Johnson is married to Kelly Quinn, the sister of former National Football League (NFL) quarterback Brady Quinn. He is the brother-in-law of former NFL linebacker AJ Hawk.

In October 2014, Johnson filed for Chapter 11 bankruptcy protection, claiming just $50,000 in assets against $10 to $15 million in estimated debts. In 2008, he decided he no longer needed the guidance of long established sports agent Pat Brisson, and would rely on his mother, Tina Johnson, to manage him; in 2011, immediately before signing his first major contract – a seven-year, $30.5 million deal with the Los Angeles Kings – Johnson granted his mother power of attorney over all his finances, despite knowing, as he claimed in a later lawsuit against lenders, that she had no idea how to manage financial planning. Over the next few years, she and Johnson's father, John II, took out several large, high-interest loans against Johnson's future earnings, a lending practice known as "monetizing," and spent the money on homes, cars and travel.

Lenders, among whom was Iowa Congressman-elect Rod Blum, eventually brought three lawsuits against Johnson for defaulting on over $6 million in debt. In court documents, Johnson claimed to have had no knowledge of his parents' spending, but would not be pursuing criminal charges against them. Instead, he filed lawsuits, totalling at least $1.5 million, including for punitive damages, against: Steve Miller, the Los Angeles mortgage broker who first introduced Tina Johnson to monetizing, and his company, National Mortgage Resources; and an investment firm, CYA Investments. Johnson admitted that he signed documents, without question, that his mother brought him, but that the fault lay with the parties he was suing. By 2016, Johnson had come to an agreement with almost all of his creditors and agreed to liquidate two homes and a luxury car and would only keep $246,000 each of the next two seasons, making him the "lowest-paid player in the NHL for the next two seasons."

Johnson eventually cut ties with his parents, but he declined to take legal action or seek restitution from his parents for their behavior. More than a decade later, his parents were both investigated by the FBI and then charged and convicted by the federal government for falsification of records during a bankruptcy proceeding, relating to a bed and breakfast they owned. His father John II was sentenced to eighteen months in prison, and his mother Tina to fifteen months.

In the spring of 2022, at age 35, Johnson graduated from the University of Michigan with a degree in general studies.

== Career statistics ==
=== Regular season and playoffs ===
			Regular season					Playoffs
Season	Team	League	GP	G	A	Pts	PIM	GP	G	A	Pts	PIM
2002–03	Shattuck-Saint Mary's	Midget	48	15	27	42	136	—	—	—	—	—
2003–04	U.S. NTDP U17	USDP	31	12	9	21	78	—	—	—	—	—
2003–04	U.S. NTDP U18	NAHL	29	3	12	15	93	—	—	—	—	—
2004–05	U.S. NTDP U18	USDP	26	5	9	14	86	—	—	—	—	—
2004–05	U.S. NTDP U18	NAHL	12	7	10	17	57	—	—	—	—	—
2005–06	University of Michigan	CCHA	38	10	22	32	149	—	—	—	—	—
2006–07	University of Michigan	CCHA	36	16	23	39	83	—	—	—	—	—
2006–07	Los Angeles Kings	NHL	5	0	0	0	18	—	—	—	—	—
2007–08	Los Angeles Kings	NHL	74	3	8	11	76	—	—	—	—	—
2008–09	Los Angeles Kings	NHL	41	6	5	11	46	—	—	—	—	—
2009–10	Los Angeles Kings	NHL	80	8	28	36	48	6	0	7	7	6
2010–11	Los Angeles Kings	NHL	82	5	37	42	44	6	1	4	5	0
2011–12	Los Angeles Kings	NHL	61	8	16	24	24	—	—	—	—	—
2011–12	Columbus Blue Jackets	NHL	21	4	10	14	15	—	—	—	—	—
2012–13	Columbus Blue Jackets	NHL	44	5	14	19	12	—	—	—	—	—
2013–14	Columbus Blue Jackets	NHL	82	5	28	33	48	6	3	4	7	4
2014–15	Columbus Blue Jackets	NHL	79	8	32	40	44	—	—	—	—	—
2015–16	Columbus Blue Jackets	NHL	60	6	8	14	25	—	—	—	—	—
2016–17	Columbus Blue Jackets	NHL	82	5	18	23	32	5	1	1	2	0
2017–18	Columbus Blue Jackets	NHL	77	3	8	11	22	—	—	—	—	—
2018–19	Pittsburgh Penguins	NHL	82	1	12	13	41	3	0	0	0	6
2019–20	Pittsburgh Penguins	NHL	67	3	8	11	26	4	0	0	0	0
2020–21	New York Rangers	NHL	13	1	0	1	8	—	—	—	—	—
2021–22	Colorado Avalanche	NHL	74	1	8	9	42	13	0	0	0	10
2022–23	Chicago Blackhawks	NHL	58	0	4	4	16	—	—	—	—	—
2022–23	Colorado Avalanche	NHL	25	2	2	4	12	3	0	0	0	2
2023–24	Colorado Avalanche	NHL	80	3	13	16	38	11	0	0	0	2
2024–25	Columbus Blue Jackets	NHL	41	0	6	6	2	—	—	—	—	—
NHL totals			1,228	77	265	342	639	57	5	16	21	30

=== International ===
Year	Team	Event	GP	G	A	Pts	PIM
2004	United States	U17	5	3	1	4	16
2004	United States	U18	6	2	0	2	18
2005	United States	U18	6	0	2	2	35
2006	United States	WJC	7	1	5	6	45
2007	United States	WJC	7	3	0	3	14
2007	United States	WC	7	1	0	1	0
2009	United States	WC	9	5	2	7	10
2010	United States	OG	6	0	1	1	2
2010	United States	WC	6	0	3	3	4
2011	United States	WC	7	1	2	3	8
2012	United States	WC	8	3	1	4	16
2016	United States	WCH	2	0	0	0	0
Junior totals			31	9	8	17	128
Senior totals			45	10	9	19	40

== Awards and honors ==
Award	Year
College
All-CCHA Rookie Team	2005–06
All-CCHA First Team	2006–07
AHCA West First-Team All-American	2006–07
CCHA All-Tournament Team	2007
NHL
Stanley Cup champion	2022

Awards and achievements
Preceded by Andrew Ladd	Carolina Hurricanes first-round draft pick 2005	Succeeded by Brandon Sutter
Preceded by Andy Greene	CCHA Best Offensive Defenseman; 2006–07	Succeeded by Tyler Eckford
