= List of Carolina Hurricanes draft picks =

The Carolina Hurricanes are a professional ice hockey franchise based in Raleigh, North Carolina. They play in the Metropolitan Division of the Eastern Conference in the National Hockey League (NHL). The franchise was founded in 1971 as the New England Whalers, and relocated to North Carolina in 1997. Since arriving in North Carolina, the Hurricanes have drafted 91 players.

The NHL entry draft is held each June, allowing teams to select players who have turned 18 years old by September 15 in the year the draft is held. The draft order is determined by the previous season's order of finish, with non-playoff teams drafting first, followed by the teams that made the playoffs, with the specific order determined by the number of points earned by each team. The NHL holds a weighted lottery for the 14 non-playoff teams, allowing the winner to move up a maximum of four positions in the entry draft. The team with the fewest points has the best chance of winning the lottery, with each successive team given a lower chance of moving up in the draft. The Hurricanes have never won the lottery. Between 1986 and 1994, the NHL also held a Supplemental Draft for players in American colleges.

Carolina's first draft pick was Nikos Tselios, taken 22nd overall in the 1997 NHL entry draft. The highest that Carolina has drafted is second overall. They selected Eric Staal in 2003, and he went on to become the first player selected after the move from Hartford that went on to play over 1,000 NHL games. No Hurricanes picks have been elected to the Hockey Hall of Fame.

== Key ==
Played in at least one NHL game with the Hurricanes
Played in at least one NHL All-Star Game or 4 Nations Face-Off

Abbreviations for statistical columns
Pos	Position	GP	Games played
G	Goals	A	Assists
Pts	Points	PIM	Penalties in minutes
GAA	Goals against average	W	Wins
L	Losses	T	Ties
OT	Overtime or shootout losses		Does not apply

Position abbreviations
G	Goaltender
D	Defenseman
LW	Left wing
C	Center
RW	Right wing
F	Forward

== Draft picks ==
Statistics are complete as of the 2025–26 NHL season and show each player's career regular season totals in the NHL. Wins, losses, ties, overtime losses and goals against average apply to goaltenders and are used only for players at that position. This list includes players drafted by the team in Carolina only.

Draft	Round	Pick	Player	Nationality	Pos	GP	G	A	Pts	PIM	W	L	T	OT	GAA	SV%
1997	1	22	Nikos Tselios	(United States)	D	2	0	0	0	6						
1997	2	28	Brad DeFauw	(United States)	LW	9	3	0	3	2						
1997	3	80	Francis Lessard	(Canada)	RW	115	1	3	4	346						
1997	4	88	Shane Willis	(Canada)	RW	174	31	43	74	77						
1997	6	142	Kyle Dafoe	(Canada)	D											
1997	7	169	Andrew Merrick	(United States)	LW											
1997	8	195	Niklas Nordgren	(Sweden)	LW	58	4	2	6	34						
1997	8	199	Randy Fitzgerald	(Canada)	LW											
1997	9	225	Kent McDonell	(Canada)	RW	32	1	2	3	36						
1998	1	11	Jeff Heerema	(Canada)	RW	32	4	2	6	6						
1998	3	70	Kevin Holdridge	(United States)	D											
1998	3	71	Erik Cole	(United States)	LW	892	265	267	532	659						
1998	4	91	Josef Vasicek	(Czech Republic)	C	460	77	106	183	311						
1998	4	93	Tommy Westlund	(Sweden)	LW	203	9	13	22	48						
1998	4	97	Chris Madden	(United States)	G											
1998	7	184	Donald Smith	(United States)	C											
1998	8	208	Jaroslav Svoboda	(Czech Republic)	LW	134	12	17	29	62						
1998	8	211	Mark Kosick	(Canada)	C											
1998	9	239	Brent McDonald	(Canada)	C											
1999	1	16	David Tanabe	(United States)	D	449	30	84	114	245						
1999	2	49	Brett Lysak	(Canada)	C	2	0	0	0	2						
1999	3	84	Brad Fast	(Canada)	D	1	1	0	1	0						
1999	4	113	Ryan Murphy	(United States)	LW											
1999	6	174	Damian Surma	(United States)	LW	2	1	1	2	0						
1999	7	202	Jim Baxter	(Canada)	D											
1999	8	231	David Evans	(United States)	RW											
1999	8	237	Antti Jokela	(Finland)	G											
1999	9	259	Yauhenni Kurilin	(Belarus)	C											
2000	2	32	Tomas Kurka	(Czech Republic)	LW	17	3	2	5	2						
2000	3	80	Ryan Bayda	(Canada)	LW	179	16	24	40	94						
2000	4	97	Niclas Wallin	(Sweden)	D	614	21	58	79	460						
2000	4	110	Jared Newman	(United States)	D											
2000	6	181	J. D. Forrest	(United States)	D											
2000	7	212	Magnus Kahnberg	(Sweden)	F											
2000	8	235	Craig Kowalski	(United States)	G											
2000	9	276	Troy Ferguson	(Canada)	F											
2001	1	15	Igor Knyazev	(Russia)	D											
2001	2	46	Michael Zigomanis	(Canada)	C	197	21	19	40	89						
2001	3	91	Kevin Estrada	(Canada)	LW											
2001	4	110	Rob Zepp	(Canada)	G	10	0	0	0	0	5	2		0	2.89	.888
2001	6	181	Daniel Boisclair	(Canada)	G											
2001	7	211	Sean Curry	(United States)	D											
2001	8	244	Carter Trevisani	(Canada)	D											
2001	9	274	Peter Reynolds	(Canada)	D											
2002	1	25	Cam Ward	(Canada)	G	701	1	12	13	48	334	256		88	2.74	.909
2002	3	91	Jesse Lane	(United States)	D											
2002	5	160	Daniel Manzato	(Canada)	G											
2002	7	224	Adam Taylor	(Canada)	C											
2003	1	2	Eric Staal	(Canada)	C	1365	455	608	1063	854						
2003	2	31	Danny Richmond	(United States)	D	49	0	3	3	75						
2003	4	102	Aaron Dawson	(United States)	D											
2003	4	126	Kevin Nastiuk	(Canada)	G											
2003	4	130	Matej Trojovsky	(Czech Republic)	D											
2003	5	137	Tyson Strachan	(Canada)	D	186	1	19	20	199						
2003	7	198	Shay Stephenson	(Canada)	LW	2	0	0	0	0						
2003	8	230	Jamie Hoffmann	(United States)	F											
2003	9	262	Ryan Rorabeck	(Canada)	C											
2004	1	4	Andrew Ladd	(Canada)	LW	1001	256	294	550	615						
2004	2	38	Justin Peters	(Canada)	G	83	0	2	2	8	25	38		9	3.08	.901
2004	3	69	Casey Borer	(United States)	D	16	1	2	3	9						
2004	4	109	Brett Carson	(Canada)	D	90	2	11	13	20						
2004	5	137	Magnus Akerlund	(Sweden)	G											
2004	7	202	Ryan Pottruff	(Canada)	D											
2004	8	235	Jonas Fiedler	(Czech Republic)	RW											
2004	9	268	Martin Vagner	(Czech Republic)	D											
2005	1	3	Jack Johnson	(United States)	D	1228	77	265	342	639						
2005	2	58	Nate Hagemo	(United States)	D											
2005	3	64	Joe Barnes	(Canada)	C											
2005	4	94	Jakub Vojta	(Czech Republic)	D											
2005	4	123	Ondrej Otcenas	(Slovakia)	C											
2005	5	145	Timothy Kunes	(United States)	D											
2005	5	159	Risto Korhonen	(Finland)	D											
2005	6	192	Nicolas Blanchard	(Canada)	LW	9	0	0	0	20						
2005	7	198	Kyle Lawson	(United States)	D											
2006	2	63	Jamie McBain	(United States)	D	348	30	80	110	72						
2006	3	93	Harrison Reed	(Canada)	RW											
2006	4	123	Bobby Hughes	(Canada)	C											
2006	5	153	Stefan Chaput	(Canada)	C											
2006	6	183	Nick Dodge	(Canada)	RW											
2006	7	213	Justin Krueger	(Germany)	D											
2007	1	11	Brandon Sutter	(United States)	C	770	152	137	289	149						
2007	3	72	Drayson Bowman	(United States)	LW	179	15	18	33	53						
2007	4	102	Justin McCrae	(Canada)	C											
2007	5	132	Chris Terry	(Canada)	LW	152	22	16	38	34						
2007	6	162	Brett Bellemore	(Canada)	D	121	4	16	20	79						
2008	1	14	Zach Boychuk	(Canada)	C	127	12	18	30	16						
2008	2	45	Zac Dalpe	(Canada)	C	168	16	16	32	38						
2008	4	105	Michal Jordan	(Czech Republic)	D	79	3	4	7	18						
2008	6	165	Mike Murphy	(Canada)	G	2	0	0	0	0	0	1	0	0	0.00	1.000
2008	7	195	Samuel Morneau	(Canada)	LW											
2009	1	27	Philippe Paradis	(Canada)	C											
2009	2	51	Brian Dumoulin	(United States)	D	788	30	164	194	202						
2009	3	88	Mattias Lindstrom	(Sweden)	LW											
2009	5	131	Matt Kennedy	(Canada)	RW											
2009	6	178	Rasmus Rissanen	(Finland)	D	6	0	0	0	4						
2009	7	208	Tommi Kivisto	(Finland)	D											
2010	1	7	Jeff Skinner	(Canada)	C	1110	379	333	712	491						
2010	2	37	Justin Faulk	(United States)	D	1058	146	352	498	520						
2010	2	53	Mark Alt	(United States)	D	20	0	0	0	4						
2010	3	67	Danny Biega	(Canada)	D	10	0	2	2	0						
2010	3	85	Austin Levi	(United States)	D											
2010	4	105	Justin Shugg	(Canada)	LW	3	0	0	0	2						
2010	6	167	Tyler Stahl	(Canada)	D											
2010	7	187	Frederik Andersen	(Denmark)	G	552	0	17	17	30	324	149		58	2.59	.913
2011	1	12	Ryan Murphy	(Canada)	D	175	8	35	43	54						
2011	2	42	Victor Rask	(Sweden)	C	506	89	134	223	86						
2011	3	73	Keegan Lowe	(United States)	D	4	0	0	0	10						
2011	4	103	Gregory Hofmann	(Switzerland)	C	24	2	5	7	8						
2011	6	163	Matt Mahalak	(United States)	G											
2011	7	193	Brody Sutter	(Canada)	C	12	0	0	0	0						
2012	2	38	Phil Di Giuseppe	(Canada)	LW	302	28	53	81	127						
2012	2	47	Brock McGinn	(Canada)	LW	534	80	78	158	120						
2012	3	69	Daniel Altshuller	(Canada)	G											
2012	4	99	Erik Karlsson	(Sweden)	LW											
2012	4	115	Trevor Carrick	(Canada)	D	7	0	0	0	12						
2012	4	120	Jaccob Slavin	(United States)	D	784	56	251	307	98						
2012	5	129	Brendan Woods	(United States)	LW	7	0	0	0	7						
2012	6	159	Collin Olson	(United States)	G											
2012	7	189	Brendan Collier	(United States)	LW											
2013	1	5	Elias Lindholm	(Sweden)	C	969	252	400	652	253						
2013	3	66	Brett Pesce	(United States)	D	736	43	179	222	262						
2013	5	126	Brent Pedersen	(Canada)	LW											
2013	6	156	Tyler Ganly	(Canada)	D											
2014	1	7	Haydn Fleury	(Canada)	D	345	12	36	48	97						
2014	2	37	Alex Nedeljkovic	(United States)	G	219	1	6	7	19	92	74		31	2.97	.902
2014	3	67	Warren Foegele	(Canada)	LW	581	117	109	226	215						
2014	4	96	Josh Wesley	(United States)	D											
2014	4	97	Lucas Wallmark	(Sweden)	RW	187	23	36	59	64						
2014	5	127	Clark Bishop	(Canada)	C	53	2	7	9	20						
2014	7	187	Kyle Jenkins	(Canada)	D											
2015	1	5	Noah Hanifin	(United States)	D	829	75	278	353	215						
2015	2	35	Sebastian Aho	(Finland)	RW	756	310	401	711	342						
2015	4	93	Callum Booth	(Canada)	G											
2015	4	96	Nicolas Roy	(Canada)	C	443	76	115	191	194						
2015	5	126	Luke Stevens	(United States)	LW											
2015	5	138	Spencer Smallman	(Canada)	RW											
2015	6	156	Jake Massie	(Canada)	D											
2015	6	169	David Cotton	(United States)	C											
2015	7	186	Steven Lorentz	(Canada)	C	381	36	44	80	67						
2016	1	13	Jake Bean	(Canada)	D	277	16	49	65	100						
2016	1	21	Julien Gauthier	(Canada)	RW	181	19	22	41	44						
2016	2	43	Janne Kuokkanen	(Finland)	LW	119	14	28	42	28						
2016	3	67	Matt Filipe	(United States)	LW											
2016	3	74	Hudson Elynuik	(Canada)	C											
2016	3	75	Jack LaFontaine	(Canada)	G	2	0	0	0	0	0	1		0	7.20	.780
2016	4	104	Max Zimmer	(United States)	LW											
2016	5	134	Jeremy Helvig	(United States)	G											
2016	6	164	Noah Carroll	(Canada)	D											
2017	1	12	Martin Necas	(Czech Republic)	C	519	162	264	426	184						
2017	2	42	Eetu Luostarinen	(Finland)	C	447	61	101	162	138						
2017	2	52	Luke Martin	(United States)	D											
2017	3	67	Morgan Geekie	(Canada)	C	414	111	116	227	126						
2017	3	73	Stelio Mattheos	(Canada)	C											
2017	4	104	Eetu Mäkiniemi	(Finland)	G	2	0	0	0	0	1	1		0	2.13	.906
2017	6	166	Brendan de Jong	(Canada)	D											
2017	7	197	Ville Rasanen	(Finland)	D											
2018	1	2	Andrei Svechnikov	(Russia)	RW	557	182	252	434	493						
2018	2	42	Jack Drury	(United States)	C	268	30	52	82	102						
2018	4	96	Luke Henman	(Canada)	C											
2018	4	104	Lenni Killinen	(Finland)	RW											
2018	6	166	Jesper Sellgren	(Sweden)	D											
2018	7	197	Jacob Kucharski	(United States)	G											
2019	1	28	Ryan Suzuki	(Canada)	C	2	0	0	0	0						
2019	2	36	Pyotr Kochetkov	(Russia)	G	125	0	3	3	16	71	38		12	2.46	.904
2019	2	44	Jamieson Rees	(Canada)	C											
2019	3	73	Patrik Puistola	(Finland)	RW											
2019	3	83	Anttoni Honka	(Finland)	D											
2019	3	90	Domenick Fensore	(United States)	D	3	0	0	0	2						
2019	4	99	Cade Webber	(United States)	D											
2019	4	121	Tuukka Tieksola	(Finland)	RW											
2019	5	152	Kirill Slepets	(Russia)	RW											
2019	6	181	Kevin Wall	(United States)	RW											
2019	6	183	Blake Murray	(Canada)	C											
2019	7	216	Massimo Rizzo	(Canada)	C											
2020	1	13	Seth Jarvis	(Canada)	C	375	128	151	279	83						
2020	2	41	Noel Gunler	(Sweden)	RW											
2020	2	53	Vasili Ponomaryov	(Russia)	C	9	1	1	2	2						
2020	3	69	Alexander Nikishin	(Russia)	D	81	11	22	33	33						
2020	4	115	Zion Nybeck	(Sweden)	LW											
2020	6	159	Lucas Mercuri	(Canada)	C											
2020	7	199	Alexander Pashin	(Russia)	RW											
2020	7	208	Ronan Seeley	(Canada)	D	1	0	0	0	0						
2021	2	40	Scott Morrow	(United States)	D	45	1	11	12	4						
2021	2	44	Aleksi Heimosalmi	(Finland)	D											
2021	2	51	Ville Koivunen	(Finland)	LW	47	2	12	14	14						
2021	3	83	Patrik Hamrla	(Czech Republic)	G											
2021	3	94	Aidan Hreschuk	(United States)	D											
2021	4	109	Jackson Blake	(United States)	RW	162	39	48	87	70						
2021	5	136	Robert Orr	(Canada)	C											
2021	5	147	Justin Robidas	(Canada)	C	4	1	2	3	0						
2021	6	170	Bryce Montgomery	(United States)	D											
2021	6	187	Nikita Quapp	(Germany)	G											
2021	7	200	Yegor Naumov	(Russia)	G											
2021	7	209	Nikita Guslistov	(Russia)	C											
2021	7	219	Joel Nystrom	(Sweden)	D	38	1	9	10	6						
2022	2	60	Gleb Trikozov	(Russia)	LW											
2022	3	71	Alexander Perevalov	(Russia)	LW											
2022	4	101	Simon Forsmark	(Sweden)	D											
2022	4	124	Cruz Lucius	(United States)	RW											
2022	5	156	Vladimir Grudinin	(Russia)	D											
2022	6	171	Jakub Vondras	(Czech Republic)	G											
2022	7	205	Alexander Pelevin	(Russia)	D											
2023	1	30	Bradly Nadeau	(Canada)	LW	15	3	1	4	2						
2023	2	62	Felix Unger Sörum	(Norway)	RW	1	0	1	1	0						
2023	3	94	Jayden Perron	(Canada)	RW											
2023	4	100	Alexander Rykov	(Russia)	RW											
2023	4	126	Stanislav Yarovoi	(Russia)	RW											
2023	5	139	Charles-Alexis Legault	(Canada)	D	12	1	1	2	15						
2023	5	158	Ruslan Khazheyev	(Russia)	G											
2023	6	163	Timur Mukhanov	(Russia)	LW											
2023	6	190	Michael Emerson	(United States)	RW											
2023	7	222	Yegor Velkmakin	(Russia)	G											
2024	2	34	Dominik Badinka	(Czech Republic)	D											
2024	2	50	Nikita Artamonov	(Russia)	LW											
2024	3	69	Noel Fransen	(Sweden)	D											
2024	4	124	Alexander Siryatsky	(Russia)	D											
2024	5	133	Oskar Voullet	(Sweden)	LW											
2024	5	156	Justin Poirier	(Canada)	RW											
2024	6	168	Timur Kol	(Russia)	D											
2024	6	184	Roman Shokhrin	(Russia)	D											
2024	6	188	Fyodor Avramov	(Russia)	LW											
2024	7	220	Andrey Kutrov	(Russia)	LW											
2025	2	41	Semyon Frolov	(Russia)	G											
2025	2	49	Charlie Cerrato	(United States)	C											
2025	3	67	Kurban Limatov	(Russia)	D											
2025	3	87	Roman Bausov	(Russia)	D											
2025	3	87	Roman Bausov	(Russia)	D											
2025	6	183	Viggo Nordlund	(Sweden)	LW											
2025	7	221	Filip Ekberg	(Sweden)	LW											
2026	2	51	William Hakansson	(Sweden)	D											
2026	2	61	Wiggo Sorensson	(Sweden)	C											
2026	3	68	Zachary Lansard	(Canada)	RW											
2026	4	105	Michael Berchild	(United States)	LW											
2026	4	125	Ryder Fetterolf	(United States)	G											
2026	6	165	Zachary Jovanoski	(Canada)	G											

== See also ==
- List of Carolina Hurricanes players
- List of Hartford Whalers draft picks
