= Jeff Skinner =

Canadian ice hockey player (born 1992)

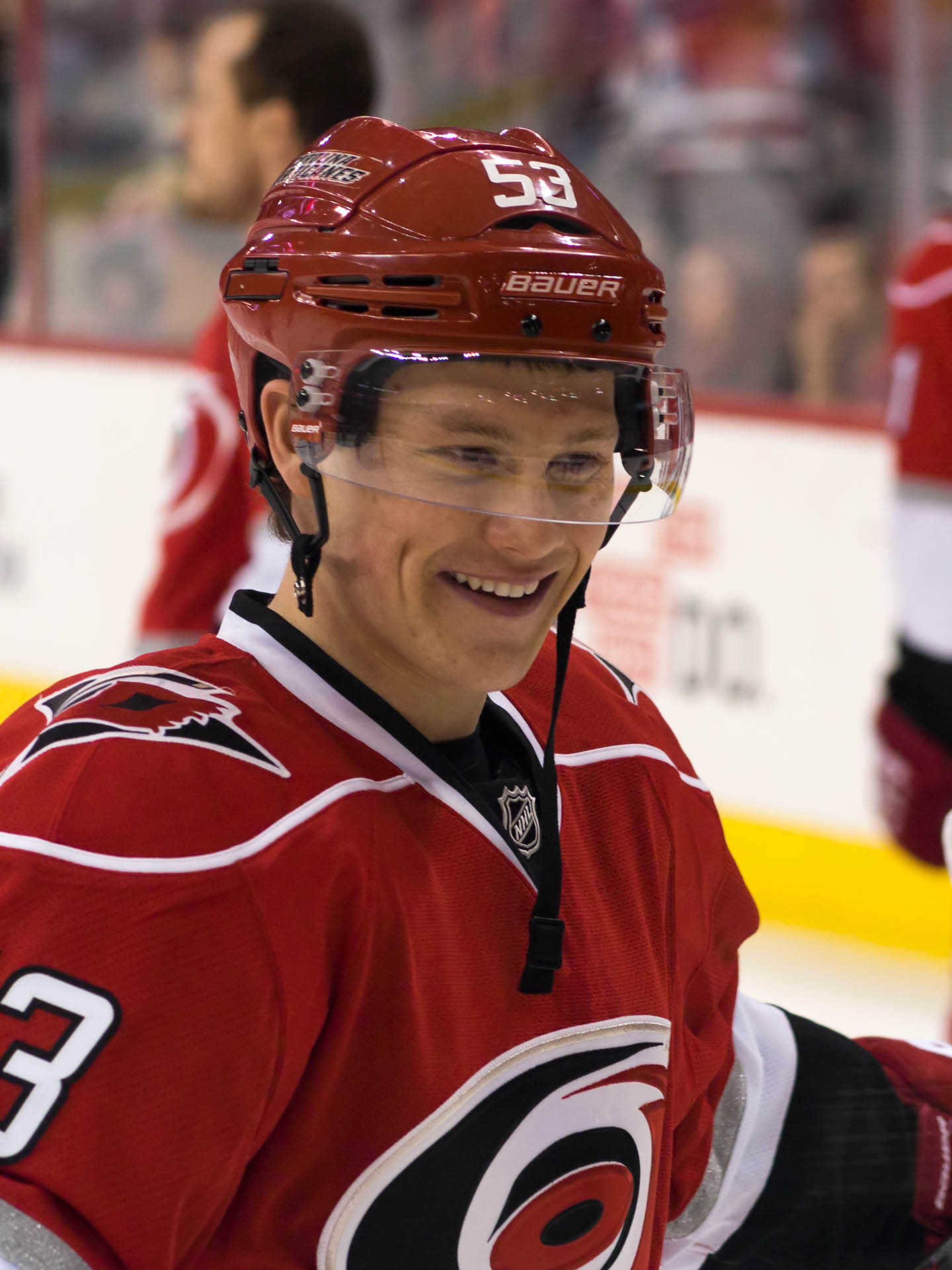
- Skinner with the Carolina Hurricanes in April 2013
- Born: May 16, 1992 (age 34) Markham, Ontario, Canada
- Height: 5 ft 11 in (180 cm)
- Weight: 200 lb (91 kg; 14 st 4 lb)
- Position: Forward
- Shoots: Left
- NL team Former teams: EHC Biel-Bienne; Carolina Hurricanes; Buffalo Sabres; Edmonton Oilers; San Jose Sharks
- National team: Canada
- NHL draft: 7th overall, 2010; Carolina Hurricanes
- Playing career: 2010–present

Jeffrey Scott Skinner (born May 16, 1992) is a Canadian professional ice hockey forward for EHC Biel-Bienne in the National League. He was selected seventh overall by the Carolina Hurricanes in the 2010 NHL entry draft, and has also played for the Buffalo Sabres, Edmonton Oilers and San Jose Sharks.

Skinner was the youngest player in the NHL during the 2010–11 season and is the youngest player ever to play in the NHL All-Star Game, as well as any All-Star game within the four major North American sports leagues. He won the Calder Memorial Trophy for best rookie in the 2010–11 season, becoming the first Hurricanes player to do so.

During the 2022–23 season, he surpassed Ron Hainsey’s record of 907 games without making the Stanley Cup playoffs. Skinner holds the NHL record for most regular season games played without a playoff appearance, having played 1,078 games before his first playoff game on April 21, 2025 with the Oilers.

== Early life ==
Skinner was born on May 16, 1992, to lawyers Andrew Skinner and Elisabeth Campin. He has five siblings, each of whom is or has been involved with hockey. He is the second-youngest among the siblings, four of whom are sisters: Jennifer, Andrea, Erica, and the youngest of the Skinner family, Jillian. Andrea formerly served as captain of the Cornell University women's hockey team and was named to Hockey Canada's board of directors in 2020, and later appointed as interim chair, the first woman to lead the organization. He also has one brother, Benjamin, who was in the Kitchener Rangers system and later played for the Herforder EV in Germany.

== Playing career ==
Involved in both ice hockey and figure skating growing up, he won a bronze medal in the juvenile division at the 2004 Canadian Junior National Figure Skating Championships. Soon after, he made the decision to focus solely on hockey. Skinner played minor ice hockey with the Toronto Jr. Canadians and Toronto Young Nationals of the Greater Toronto Hockey League and the Markham Waxers of the Ontario Minor Hockey Association. In his midget hockey career Skinner played on the wing with future Colorado Avalanche captain Gabriel Landeskog. He played in the 2005 Quebec International Pee-Wee Hockey Tournament with Markham.

=== Junior ===
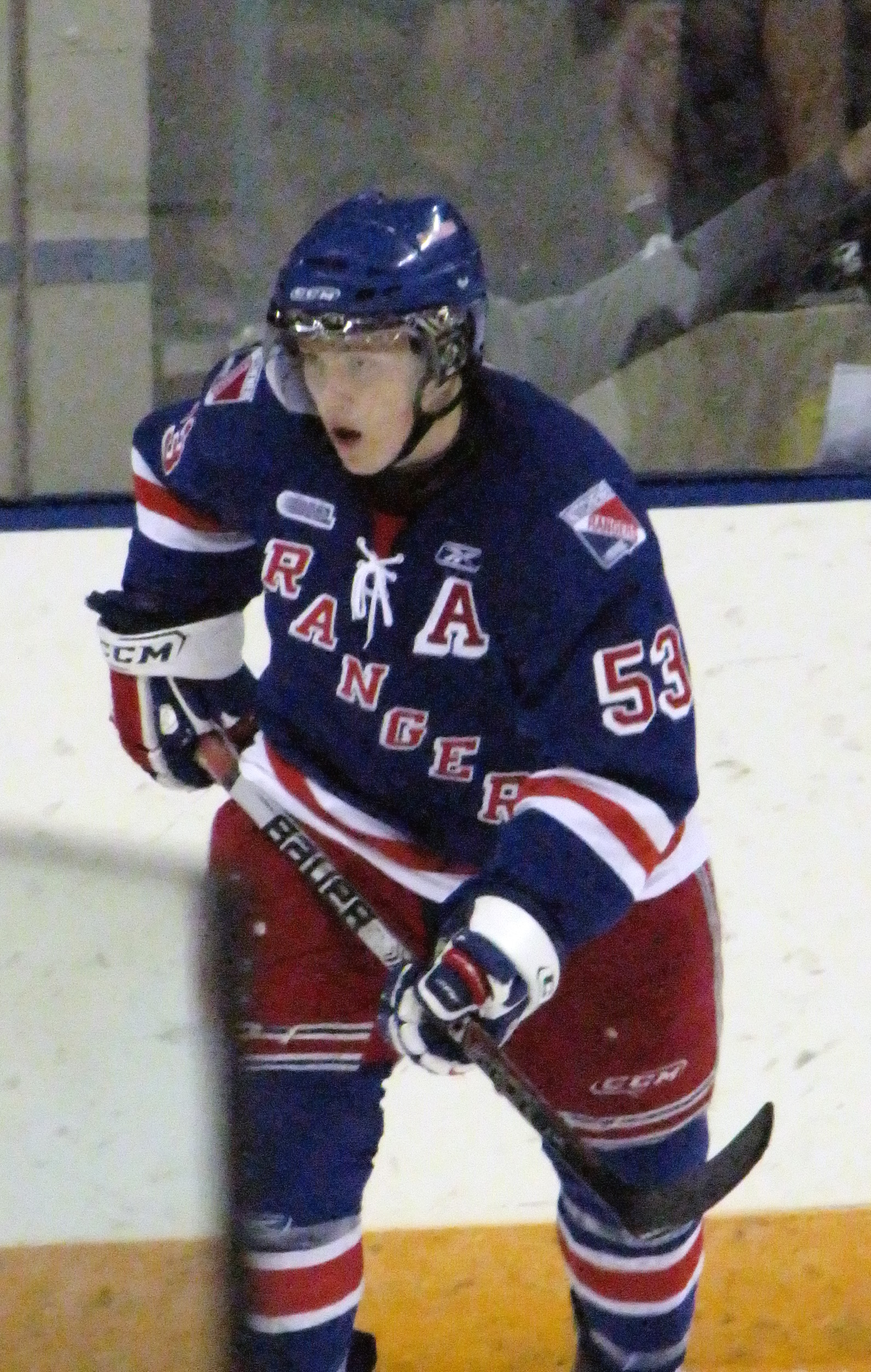
Skinner as a Kitchener Ranger in September 2010

Coming off a successful season with the Toronto Young Nationals, Skinner was drafted 20th overall in the 2008 Ontario Hockey League (OHL) draft by the Kitchener Rangers. He made his OHL debut on September 18, 2008, where he recorded two goals and an assist in the 4–2 win over the Plymouth Whalers. By November 13, 2008, Skinner was selected to compete with Team Canada at the 2009 World U-17 Hockey Challenge, where he helped the team win a gold medal by scoring the game-winning goal. A few days later, Skinner was presented with the Rangers Academic Player of the Month Award for his academic success while attending Eastwood Collegiate Institute.

After leading the Rangers in scoring through his rookie campaign, Skinner participated in the 2009 Ivan Hlinka Memorial Tournament, scoring 6 goals for 6 points, while winning the gold medal with Team Canada. Upon his return to the Ontario Hockey League for his sophomore season, he was named an Assistant Captain alongside Mike Mascioli. During the season, Skinner scored 50 goals and led all CHL draft-eligible forwards in goal scoring. He became the first Ranger in 23 years to reach the 50-goal milestone. However, despite leading the league in goals at the time, the NHL Central Scouting Bureau ranked Skinner as the 47th best North American skater during their midterm rankings, and only 34th during the final rankings. This contrasted ratings from other organizations such as ISS and TSN's Bob McKenzie who had him much higher.

=== Professional (2010–present) ===
==== Carolina Hurricanes (2010–2018) ====
In his first year of eligibility, Skinner was drafted in the first round, seventh overall, by the Carolina Hurricanes in the 2010 NHL entry draft. At the time of his selection, the Hurricanes’ director of amateur scouting stated ”There’s nobody in the draft that scores goals like Jeff Skinner." During his first NHL training camp, he signed a three-year, entry-level contract with the Hurricanes on September 21, 2010, worth $2.7 million. On October 7, Skinner made his NHL debut with the opening roster in the Hurricanes' 4–3 win against the Minnesota Wild during the NHL Premiere Series in Helsinki, Finland. In 16 minutes of ice time, he had two shots. The following day, Skinner recorded his first career NHL point with an assist on Tuomo Ruutu's goal. He also scored the game winning shootout goal to become the third-youngest player in NHL history to score a shootout goal. On October 20, Skinner scored his first NHL career goal against Jonathan Bernier of the Los Angeles Kings in his fifth game of the season.

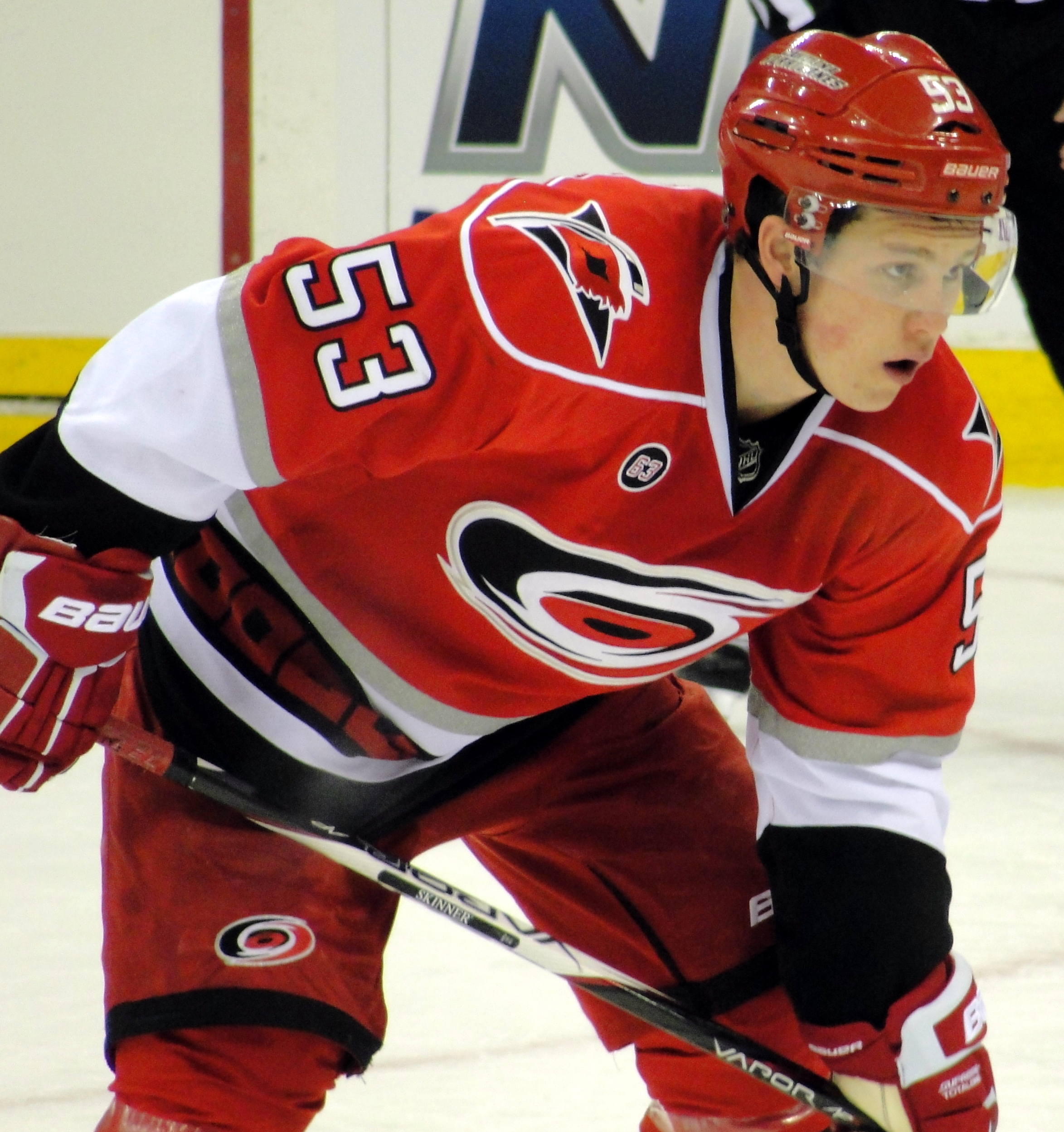
Skinner with the Hurricanes in November 2011.

Midway through his rookie campaign, Skinner was named to the 2011 All-Star Game roster as an injury replacement for Sidney Crosby, making him the first member of the 2010 draft class to be named to the All-Star Game, and the first 18-year-old NHL All-Star since Steve Yzerman. He was chosen by fellow Hurricane Eric Staal, captain of Team Staal. He was later named January 2011's NHL Rookie of the Month. As of 2024, Skinner remains the youngest player to play in an NHL All-Star Game. (Note: Connor Bedard had been named to the 2024 NHL All-Star Game. If he had played, Bedard would have beaten Skinner's youth record by 58 days. However, Bedard did not play in the 2024 All-Star game due to a jaw injury.) At the NHL Awards ceremony on June 22, 2011, in Las Vegas, Nevada, Skinner was awarded the Calder Memorial Trophy as the NHL's top rookie, beating-out fellow rookies Logan Couture of the San Jose Sharks and Michael Grabner of the New York Islanders. At that time, he was the NHL's youngest player as well as the first Hurricanes player to ever win the Calder. After his successful rookie campaign, Skinner was named to Team Canada's National Team to compete at the 2011 IIHF World Championship, becoming the youngest player in the tournament. However, he returned to the Hurricanes lineup for his sophomore season without a medal after Canada placed fifth. Skinner began the season strong, recording 12 goals and 12 assists in 30 games to lead the team in scoring, yet it would be cut short due to a hit by Andy Sutton. The hit which occurred during a game against the Edmonton Oilers on December 7, 2011, caused Skinner to miss time due to a concussion. He eventually returned to the Hurricanes lineup after missing 16 games on January 5, 2012. As Skinner slowly acclimated to playing again, he was suspended two games for kicking Scott Nichol of the St. Louis Blues on March 15, 2012.

During the 2012 off-season, and the final year of his entry-level contract, Skinner and the Hurricanes agreed to a six-year contract extension worth $34.4 million which would keep him under contract until the 2018–19 season. His third season in the NHL was once again plagued with injuries as on February 14, 2013, Skinner was diagnosed with an upper-body injury, later deemed a concussion, after a game in Toronto.

To begin the 2013–14 season, Skinner recorded nine points in nine games to lead the team. On December 4, 2013, Skinner earned his first career hat trick against the Nashville Predators. However, his high scoring play ended during the 2014–15 season when he sustained a concussion on a hit from Washington Capitals defenceman Matt Niskanen. He accumulated only 31 points that season and had an eight game long pointless streak.

On December 11, 2015, Skinner recorded his second hat trick against the Anaheim Ducks in a 5–1 victory. Three games later, on December 15, 2015, he scored another hat trick, this time against the Philadelphia Flyers. Skinner was named alternate captain of the Hurricanes for the 2016–17 and the 2017–18 seasons.

==== Buffalo Sabres (2018–2024) ====
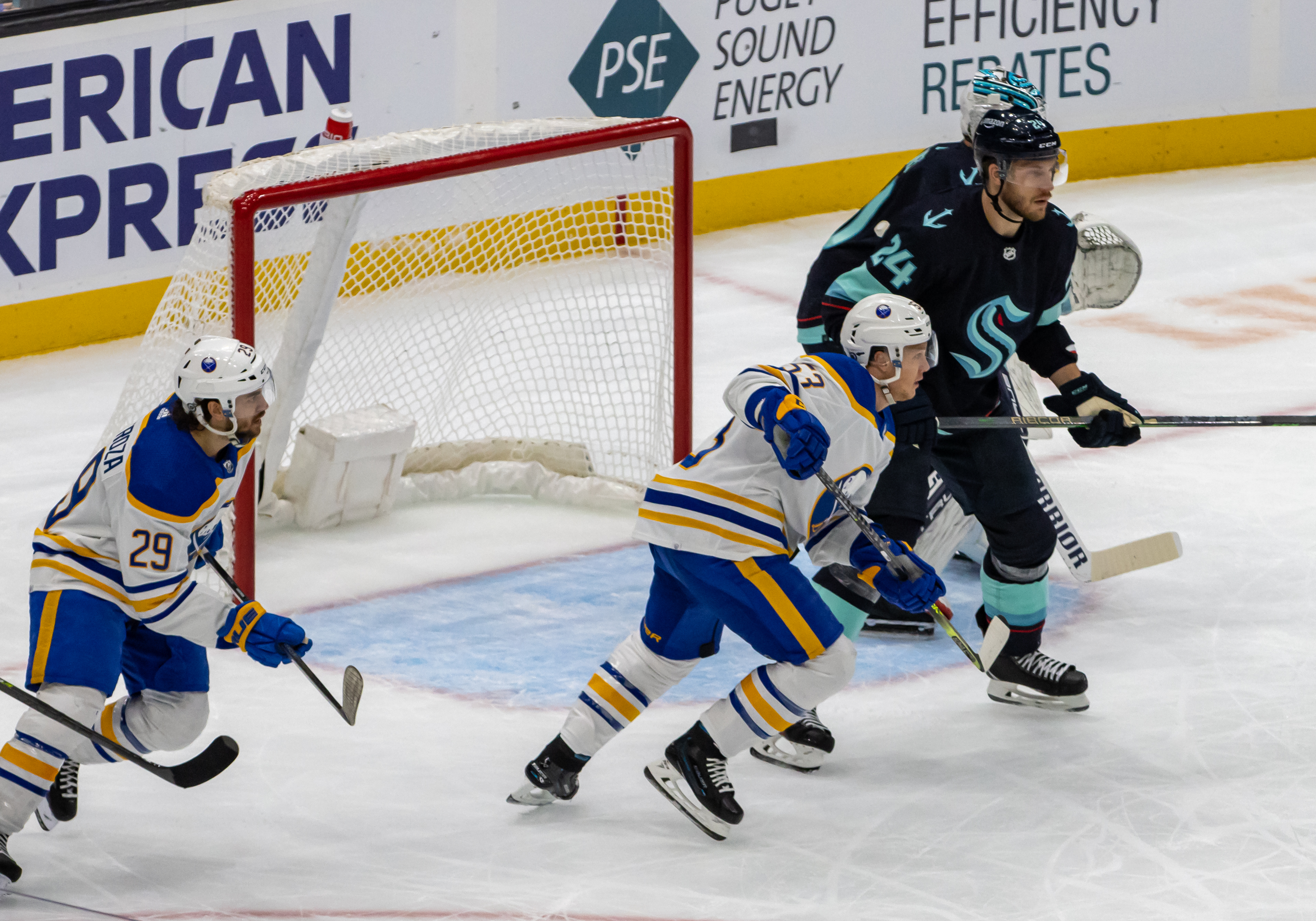
Skinner (middle) against the Seattle Kraken in October 2022.

On August 2, 2018, after eight seasons with the Hurricanes, Skinner was traded to the Buffalo Sabres in exchange for Cliff Pu, a second-round selection in the 2019 NHL entry draft, a third-Round pick in the 2020 NHL entry draft, and a sixth-round pick the same draft. In November 2018, Skinner became the second player in Sabres' history to score 20 goals before December, and the seventh player to score at least 20 goals in less than 27 games. On April 6, Skinner scored twice in the season finale against the Detroit Red Wings, upping his total to 40 goals scored on the season, the first time in his career that he has reached that mark.

On June 7, 2019, Skinner re-signed with the Sabres on an eight-year, $72 million contract extension with an annual average of $9 million. He struggled under new head coach Ralph Krueger, receiving limited icetime and limited opportunities, scoring just 21 goals and 37 points in 102 games in the next 2 seasons.

In 2021–22, Skinner enjoyed a bounce back season under new head coach Don Granato, scoring 33 goals and matching his career-high of 63 points for the fourth time.

He received a three-game suspension for cross-checking Jake Guentzel of the Pittsburgh Penguins during an altercation between the Penguins and Sabres on December 9, 2022.

In June 2024, rumors began circulating that Skinner’s time with the Buffalo Sabres could potentially be coming to an end. The left winger posted 24 goals and 22 assists in 74 games with the Sabres during the 2023–24 season. With Lindy Ruff replacing Don Granato as head coach, the possibility of a Skinner buyout seemed likely because Skinner did not fit the new coach’s scheme. On June 29, 2024, the Sabres announced that they would be buying out the remainder of Skinner’s contract, ending his tenure in Buffalo and rendering him a free agent.

==== Edmonton Oilers (2024–2025) ====
After becoming a free agent on July 1, 2024, Skinner signed a one-year, $3 million contract with the Edmonton Oilers. He scored his first goal as an Oiler on October 13, 2024, in a 4–1 loss to the Calgary Flames. Initially signed to play in the team's top six, he struggled in the role and was soon demoted down the lineup, with coach Kris Knoblauch said to fault his defensive responsibility. Skinner ultimately appeared in 72 games during the 2024–25 regular season, registering 16 goals and 13 assists.

Skinner made the playoffs for the first time in his career with the Oilers after 1,078 regular season games, an NHL record. In his playoff debut on April 21, 2025, in the first game of the Oilers' first round series against the Los Angeles Kings, he registered an assist on a goal by Mattias Janmark. However, he was healthy scratched in favour of Evander Kane for the second game, and thereafter did not play again against the Kings or in the Oilers' second round series against the Vegas Golden Knights. Following an injury to Zach Hyman, Skinner dressed for his second playoff game on May 29, the fifth game of the Oilers' Western Conference Final against the Dallas Stars, and scored his first career playoff goal. The Oilers reached the 2025 Stanley Cup Final, with Skinner making his Finals debut in Game 4 of the championship series.

==== San Jose Sharks (2025–2026) ====
On July 11, 2025, Skinner signed a one-year, $3 million contract with the San Jose Sharks for the 2025–26 season. After posting 13 points in 32 games, he was placed on waivers to terminate his contract on February 16, 2026.

==== EHC Biel-Bienne (2026–present) ====
On August 14, 2026, Skinner signed a one year contract with EHC Biel-Bienne of the National League in Switzerland.

== Personal life ==
During his tenure with the Hurricanes, Skinner launched the '53's Difference Makers' Program, aimed to recognize local teachers at home games.

== Career statistics ==
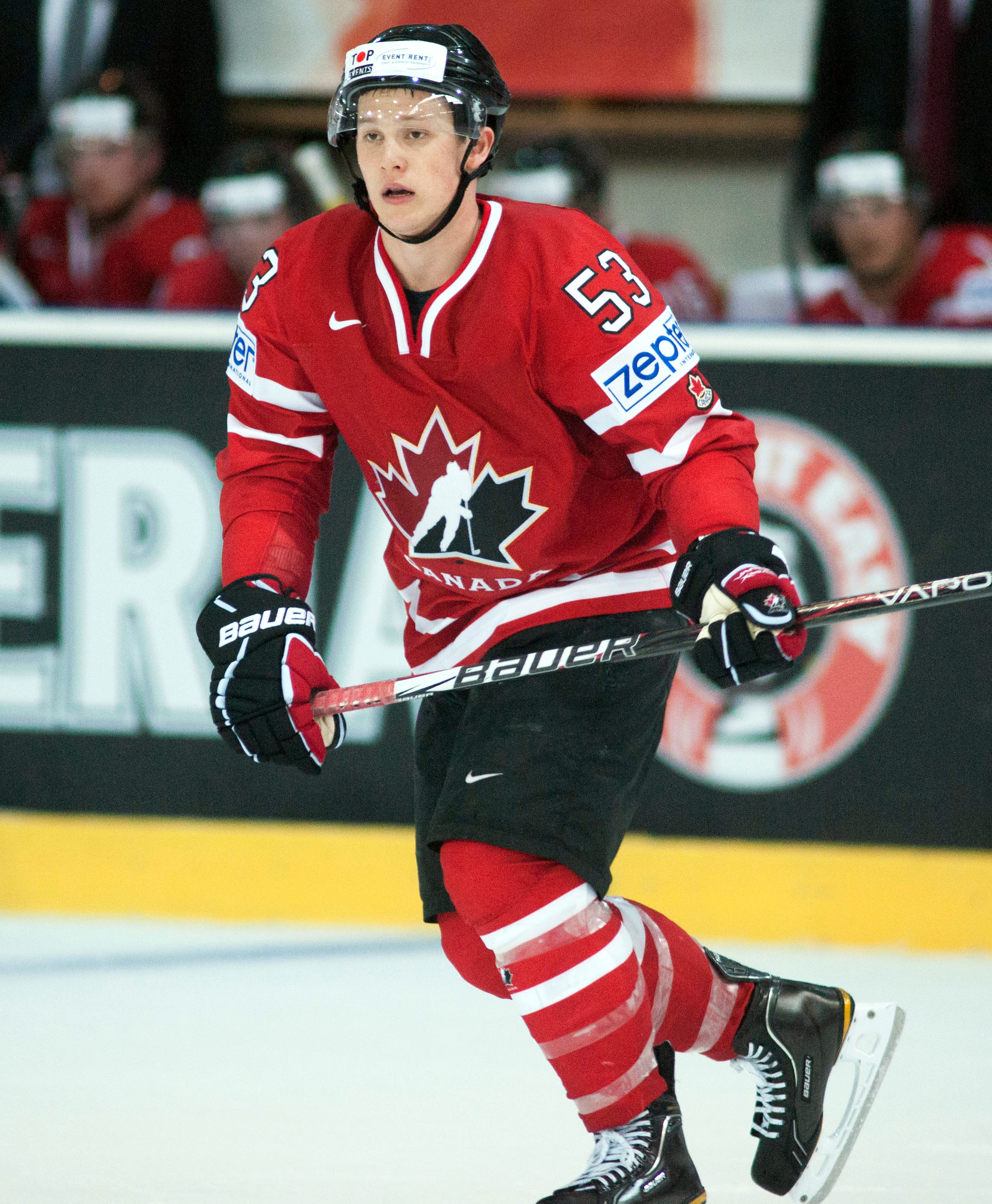
- Skinner at the 2012 World Championships

Medal record

Men's ice hockey

Representing Canada

World Championships
Silver medal – second place	2017 Germany/France	

=== Regular season and playoffs ===
			Regular season					Playoffs
Season	Team	League	GP	G	A	Pts	PIM	GP	G	A	Pts	PIM
2007–08	Toronto Young Nats AAA	GTHL U16	36	44	24	68	99	—	—	—	—	—
2008–09	Kitchener Rangers	OHL	63	27	24	51	72	—	—	—	—	—
2009–10	Kitchener Rangers	OHL	64	50	40	90	34	20	20	13	33	14
2010–11	Carolina Hurricanes	NHL	82	31	32	63	46	—	—	—	—	—
2011–12	Carolina Hurricanes	NHL	64	20	24	44	56	—	—	—	—	—
2012–13	Carolina Hurricanes	NHL	42	13	11	24	26	—	—	—	—	—
2013–14	Carolina Hurricanes	NHL	71	33	21	54	22	—	—	—	—	—
2014–15	Carolina Hurricanes	NHL	77	18	13	31	18	—	—	—	—	—
2015–16	Carolina Hurricanes	NHL	82	28	23	51	38	—	—	—	—	—
2016–17	Carolina Hurricanes	NHL	79	37	26	63	28	—	—	—	—	—
2017–18	Carolina Hurricanes	NHL	82	24	25	49	34	—	—	—	—	—
2018–19	Buffalo Sabres	NHL	82	40	23	63	36	—	—	—	—	—
2019–20	Buffalo Sabres	NHL	59	14	9	23	18	—	—	—	—	—
2020–21	Buffalo Sabres	NHL	53	7	7	14	14	—	—	—	—	—
2021–22	Buffalo Sabres	NHL	80	33	30	63	42	—	—	—	—	—
2022–23	Buffalo Sabres	NHL	79	35	47	82	39	—	—	—	—	—
2023–24	Buffalo Sabres	NHL	74	24	22	46	34	—	—	—	—	—
2024–25	Edmonton Oilers	NHL	72	16	13	29	26	5	1	1	2	0
2025–26	San Jose Sharks	NHL	32	6	7	13	14	—	—	—	—	—
NHL totals			1,100	379	333	712	491	5	1	1	2	0

=== International ===
Year	Team	Event	Result	GP	G	A	Pts	PIM
2009	Canada Ontario	U17	1st place, gold medalist(s)	6	2	4	6	4
2009	Canada	IH18	1st place, gold medalist(s)	4	6	0	6	16
2011	Canada	WC	5th	7	3	3	6	8
2012	Canada	WC	5th	8	3	2	5	4
2013	Canada	WC	5th	8	2	2	4	2
2017	Canada	WC	2nd place, silver medalist(s)	10	4	5	9	27
Junior totals				10	8	4	12	20
Senior totals				33	12	12	24	41

== Notes ==
Awards and achievements
Preceded by Philippe Paradis	Carolina Hurricanes first-round draft pick 2010	Succeeded by Ryan Murphy
Preceded by Tyler Myers	Winner of the Calder Trophy; 2011	Succeeded by Gabriel Landeskog
