= Alfie (name) =

- Pronunciation: /ælfi/

Origin
- Origin: Ælfred/Ælflaed

Alfie is a given name, surname, and nickname for the given names Alfonso and Alfred. Alfie may refer to:

== People ==
=== In sports ===
- Alfie Almario (1963–2001), Philippine Basketball Association player.
- Alfie Beestin (born 1997), English professional footballer.
- Alfred "Alfie" Biggs (1936–2012), English footballer.
- Alfred "Alfie" Binns (1929–2017), West Indian cricketer.
- Alfred "Alfie" Burden (born 1976), English snooker player
- Alfred "Alfie" Conn Sr. (1926–2009), Scottish international footballer
- Alfred "Alfie" Conn Jr. (born 1952), Scottish international footballer, son of the above
- Alfie Cullen (1914–1998), Irish hurler.
- Alfie Egan (born 1997), English footballer
- Alfie Evans (1917–1992), Australian rules footballer
- Alfie Gleadall (born 2000), English cricketer
- Alf-Inge Haaland (born 1972), Norwegian former footballer, also known as Alfie Haaland
- Alfred "Alfie" Hale (born 1939), Irish former footballer and manager
- Alfie Hewett (born 1997), British wheelchair tennis player
- Alfred "Alfie" Jacques (1949 – 2023), Native American lacrosse player and stickmaker
- Allan Jeffrey "Alfie" Langer (born 1966), Australian rugby league player
- Justin Langer (born 1970), Australian former cricketer, known by the nickname "Alfie"
- Adam Le Fondre (born 1986), English football player, known by the nickname ALF or subsequently Alfie
- Alphonsus "Alfie" Linehar (1940–2019), Irish former cricketer
- Alfie Mafi (born 1988), Australian rugby union football player
- Alfie Mawson (born 1994), English footballer
- Alfie May (born 1993), English professional footballer
- Alfie Michaud (born 1976), Canadian ice hockeyer
- Alfie Miller (born 1954), British ice hockey player
- Alfie Mocelutu (born 1971), former Fijian rugby union player
- Alfie Moore (1904–1979), professional ice hockey goaltender
- Alfie Pavey (born 1995), English footballer
- Alfie Plant (born 1995), English professional golfer
- Alfie Stokes (1932–2002), footballer
- Alfie Potter (born 1989), English footballer
- Alfred "Alfie" Shrubb (1879–1964), English middle and long-distance runner
- Gareth Thomas (rugby, born 1974) (born 1974), Welsh former rugby union team captain, nicknamed "Alfie"
- Real Jean "Alfie" Turcotte (born 1965), American former National Hockey League player
- Alfred Uluinayau (born 1970), New Zealand rugby union coach and former player
- Alfie Vaeluaga (born 1981), rugby union player from Samoa
- Alfie Whiteman (born 1998), English footballer

=== In arts and entertainment ===
- Alfie Agnew (born 1969), American mathematician, singer, musician, and songwriter
- Alfie Anido (1959–1981), popular Filipino matinee idol
- Alfie Arcuri (born 1988), Australian singer-songwriter
- Alfie Allen (born 1986), English actor
- Alfie Bass (1916–1987), English actor born Abraham Basalinsky
- Alfred "Alfie" Boe (born 1973), English tenor and actor
- Alfie Browne-Sykes (born 1994), English actor
- Alfie Clarke (actor) (born 2007), English actor
- Alfie Curtis (1930–2017), English actor
- Alfie Deyes (born 1993), English YouTuber, property investor, and author
- Robert Hannaford (born 1944), Australian realist artist known as Alfie
- Alfie Joey (born 1967), writer, comic, actor, impressionist, singer, presenter, and cartoonist
- Alfie Lorenzo (1939–2017), Filipino showbiz columnist, TV host, and talent manager
- Alfie Moore (comedian) (born 1966), English police officer, writer, stand-up comedian, and radio performer
- Alfie Scopp (1919–2021), Canadian actor
- Alfie Templeman (born 2003), English singer-songwriter, multi-instrumentalist and producer
- Alfie Williams (born 2011), English child actor
- Joe Alfie Winslet Mendes (born 2003), American-British actor, known professionally as Joe Anders
- Alfie Zappacosta (born 1953), Canadian singer/songwriter

=== Politicians ===
- Alfred "Alfie" Byrne (1882–1956), Irish politician
- Alfie Ferguson, British and unionist politician
- Alfred "Alfie" MacLeod (born 1956), Canadian politician

=== Other ===
- Alfie Dennen, British technologist and artist
- Alfred "Alfie" Fripp (1913–2013), Second World War Royal Air Force flight sergeant
- Alfie Kohn (born 1957), American author and lecturer
- Alfie Lambe (1932–1959), Irish-born Roman Catholic activist
- Isaac Alfie (born 1962), Uruguayan economist, former Minister of Economy and Finance

== Characters ==
- Alfie Moon, in the BBC soap opera EastEnders
- Alfie O'Meagan, a Marvel Comics supervillain
- Alfie Wickers, protagonist of the British TV series Bad Education
- Alfie, an excavator in Thomas & Friends
- Alfie, from "Demon Dentist" by David Walliams
- Alfie, one of the titular characters in the Alfie & Annie Rose stories by Shirley Hughes
- Alfie, a customer service assistant in Bluey
- Alfie, a love interest of the titular character in the Netflix series Emily in Paris

== See also ==
- Alf (name)
- Alfred (disambiguation)
- Alfie (disambiguation)
