= ALF =

Alf or ALF may refer to:

== Arts and entertainment ==
=== Fictional characters ===
- ALF (character), the title character of the American sitcom
- Alf Garnett, from the BBC's Till Death Us Do Part
- Alf Thompson, a character in BBC's stop motion named Postman Pat
- Alf Mason, character in American animated television series Fox's Peter Pan & the Pirates
- Alf Mushpie, in the comic strip Bloom County
- Alf Roberts, from the British television program Coronation Street
- Alf Stewart, from the Australian television program Home and Away
- Alf Tupper, in the comic Victor
- Alf Wit, in the comic The Beano
- Sir Alf, in the film Monty Python and the Holy Grail, eaten by the Black Beast of Aaaaarrrrrrggghhh
- 'Unlucky' Alf, in the BBC's The Fast Show
- One of the title characters in Alf, Bill and Fred, a 1964 American animated short film

=== Other uses in arts and entertainment ===
- ALF (TV series), American sitcom
  - "A.L.F." (ALF episode), the series premiere
  - ALF: The Animated Series, based on the TV series
  - ALF Tales, based on the TV series
- ALF (video game), released by Sega in 1989
- Alf (album), 1984, by Alison Moyet

== People ==
- Alf (name), given name, nickname or surname, including a list of people with the name
- Adam Le Fondre, English footballer whose nickname is ALF or Alfie due to his initials

== Places ==
- Alf, Rhineland-Palatinate, a local municipality in Zell, Germany
- Alf (river) or Alfbach, a tributary of the Moselle River in Germany

== Companies and organizations ==
- Academia Latinitati Fovendae, a learned society promoting the use of written and spoken Latin
- ALF Products, former personal-computer products manufacturer
- Afar Liberation Front, an Ethiopian political party of the Afar people
- Africa Leadership Forum, a Nigerian organization
- American LaFrance, a former emergency and vocational vehicle manufacturer
- American Legacy Foundation, the former name of the modern-day Truth Initiative
- American Liver Foundation, an American organization for liver health and disease prevention
- American Lighthouse Foundation, an American organization
- Animal Liberation Front, a name used by animal liberationists
- Arab Liberation Front, a Palestinian group

== Health ==
- ALF (psychology), a group therapy model
- Acute liver failure
- Assisted living facility, facility providing assistance to aged, infirm, or disabled adults

== Mythology ==
- Alf, the son of Alrik, of Yngvi and Alf
- Alf, the son of Sigar, of Alf and Alfhild
- Alf, one of the álfar

== Technology ==
- Alege language (ISO-639-3 code "alf")
- ALF (proof assistant), dependently typed programming language/theorem prover
- Action Language for Foundational UML
- Advanced Library Format, an ASIC databook
- Algebraic Logic Functional programming language
- Algorithms for Lattice Fermions, a Quantum Monte Carlo package
- Application layer framing
- Application Lifecycle Framework, integration framework for ALM tools
- Atomic line filter, an advanced optical filter

== Transportation ==
- Hildesheim (district), Germany (vehicle license plate prefix "ALF")
- Alta Airport, Norway (IATA airport code "ALF")
- Alfreton railway station, UK (National Rail code "ALF")
- Alf (barque), wrecked on Haisboro Sands in 1909

== Other uses ==
- Atlas linguistique de la France, a dialect atlas published between 1902 and 1910

== See also ==
- ALFSEA, or Allied Land Forces South East Asia, the British Army unit during the Second World War
- Alfred (disambiguation)
- Alfie (disambiguation)
- Alph (disambiguation)
