= Alfred =

Alfred may refer to:

== Arts and entertainment ==
- Alfred J. Kwak, Dutch-German-Japanese anime television series
- Alfred (Arne opera), a 1740 masque by Thomas Arne
- Alfred (Dvořák), an 1870 opera by Antonín Dvořák
- "Alfred (Interlude)" and "Alfred (Outro)", songs by Eminem from the 2020 album Music to Be Murdered By

== Business and organisations ==
- Alfred, a radio station in Shaftesbury, England
- Alfred Coffee, a Los Angeles-based coffeehouse company.
- Alfred Music, an American music publisher
- Alfred University, New York, U.S.
- The Alfred Hospital, a hospital in Melbourne, Australia

== People ==
- Alfred (given name), including a list of people and fictional characters called Alfred
- Alfred (surname)

== Places ==
=== Antarctica ===
- Mount Alfred (Antarctica)

=== Australia ===
- Alfredtown, New South Wales
- County of Alfred, South Australia

=== Canada ===
- Alfred and Plantagenet, Ontario
  - Alfred, Ontario, a community in Alfred and Plantagenet
- Alfred Island, Nunavut
- Mount Alfred, British Columbia

=== United States ===
- Alfred, Maine, a New England town
  - Alfred (CDP), Maine, the main village in the town
- Alfred, New York, a town
  - Alfred (village), New York, within the town of Alfred
- Alfred, North Dakota
- Alfred, Texas
- Lake Alfred, Florida

== Other uses ==
- HMS Alfred, the name of several ships of the Royal Navy
- USS Alfred, launched in 1774 as Black Prince
- PS Alfred, a paddle steamer
- Alfred (software), an application launcher for macOS
- ALFRED (nuclear reactor), lead-cooled fast reactor demonstrator
- Allele Frequency Net Database (AlFreD), an electronic database of genetic alleles
- Cyclone Alfred, several tropical cyclones in the Australian region

== See also ==
- Alfredo (disambiguation)
- HMS King Alfred
- HMS Royal Alfred (1864)
