= Jonathon Blum =

American ice hockey player (born 1989)

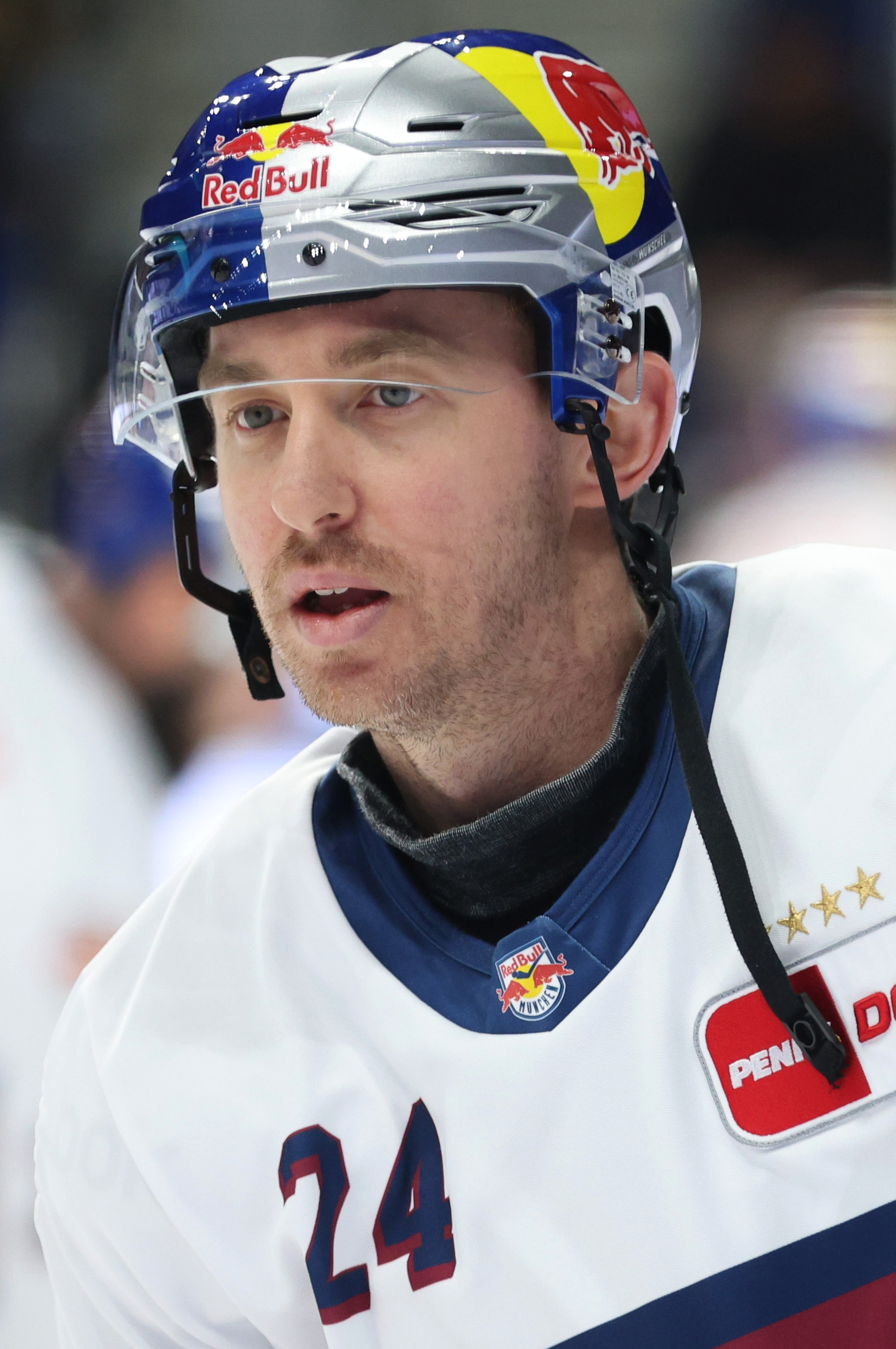
- Blum with Munich in 2025
- Born: January 30, 1989 (age 37) Long Beach, California, U.S.
- Height: 6 ft 2 in (188 cm)
- Weight: 194 lb (88 kg; 13 st 12 lb)
- Position: Defense
- Shoots: Right
- DEL2 team Former teams: EV Landshut; Milwaukee Admirals; Nashville Predators; Minnesota Wild; Iowa Wild; Admiral Vladivostok; HC Sochi; Dinamo Minsk; Färjestad BK; EHC Red Bull München; HC Pustertal Wölfe
- National team: United States
- NHL draft: 23rd overall, 2007; Nashville Predators
- Playing career: 2009–present

Jonathon Gregory Blum (born January 30, 1989) is an American professional ice hockey defenseman, currently playing with EV Landshut of the DEL2.

Blum was born in Long Beach, California and grew up in Rancho Santa Margarita, California. During his major junior career with the Vancouver Giants of the Western Hockey League (WHL), Blum helped the club to a President's Cup as WHL champions in 2006 and a Memorial Cup as Canadian Hockey League (CHL) champions in 2007. He received the Bill Hunter Memorial Trophy as the WHL's top defenseman and the CHL Defenceman of the Year Award in 2009. In his final season with the Giants, he established himself as the franchise's all-time assists leader.

He was selected by the Predators 23rd overall in the 2007 NHL entry draft. Turning professional in 2009, he spent parts of three seasons with the Predators' minor league affiliate, the Milwaukee Admirals of the American Hockey League (AHL), before joining the Predators. Internationally, Blum has represented Team USA on four occasions. He won silver at the 2006 Ivan Hlinka Memorial Tournament, and has competed in the 2008 and 2009 World Junior Championships, finishing without a medal both times. He also competed at the 2018 Winter Olympics, once again failing to medal.

== Early life ==
Blum was born in Long Beach, California, to parents John and Dana. An avid surfer growing up in Rancho Santa Margarita, approximately 40 miles southeast of Long Beach, Blum was initially playing roller hockey recreationally at the age of four before discovering ice hockey a couple of years later. He played minor hockey with the California Wave, a team led by Jeff Turcotte, younger brother of former NHL player Alfie Turcotte. Due to the lack of elite minor hockey competition in California, the team travelled to Canada and the Northeast United States to play in top-level tournaments. Blum and the Wave recorded second-place finishes in national Midget AAA and Bantam AAA championships culminating in an international Bantam tournament championship in Kamloops, British Columbia, in 2004. Discovered by scouts at one such tournament, Blum was drafted by the Vancouver Giants of the WHL in the seventh round of the junior draft.

In the midst of his pending major junior career, his family was beset with tragedy. A few months prior to his first training camp in Vancouver and still a freshman at Trabuco Hills High School, his family's house caught fire from a gas leak on April 2, 2004, killing his twin sister, Ashley. Blum has two remaining half-siblings, an older brother and sister. Shortly after, his mother was diagnosed with a form of juvenile cancer, which almost caused Blum to opt not to leave for Vancouver to be close to family instead, but he went at her urging to continue on his hockey path. She underwent heart surgery and chemotherapy to overcome the cancer by May 2006.

== Playing career ==
=== Vancouver Giants ===
Drafted 134th overall in the 2004 WHL Bantam Draft, Blum played his first season with the Vancouver Giants of the WHL in 2005–06, recording 24 points as a rookie. He added 8 points in the post-season, helping the Giants to a President's Cup as WHL champions and a berth in the 2006 Memorial Cup in Moncton, where they finished third. The following season, in 2006–07, Blum improved to 51 points as the Giants prepared to defend their WHL title as 2007 Memorial Cup hosts. With a league-high +37 plus-minus, he earned the WHL Plus-Minus Award. Blum also participated in the CHL Top Prospects Game along with teammates Tyson Sexsmith, Michal Repik and Spencer Machacek. The Giants met the Medicine Hat Tigers in the WHL finals, where they were defeated in seven games. Then, facing the Tigers in the Memorial Cup final Blum and the Giants captured the franchise's first Canadian Hockey League (CHL) title by a 3–1 score. That off-season, going into the 2007 NHL entry draft, Blum was ranked 17th among North American skaters by NHL Central Scouting. He was selected 23rd overall by the Nashville Predators, becoming the first California-born-and-raised player to be drafted in the first round.

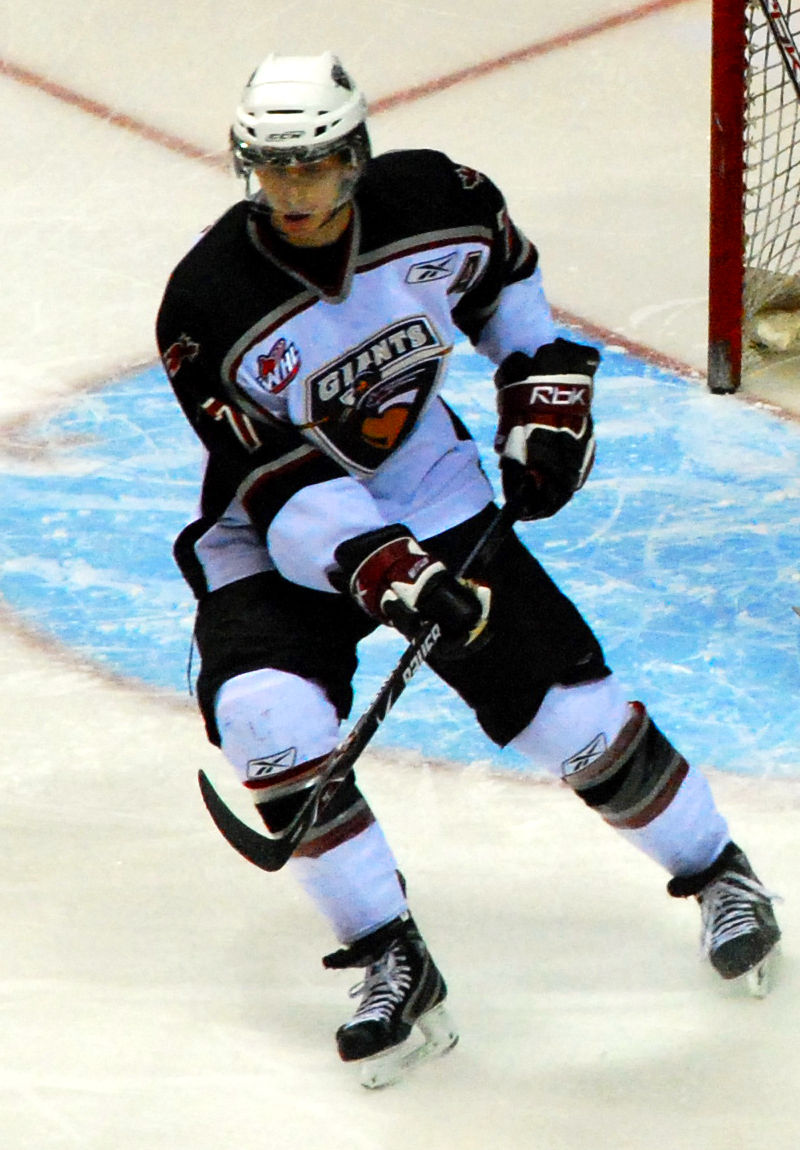
Blum with the Vancouver Giants in 2007–08

After being sent back to junior from the Predators' training camp in September 2007, Blum was signed to an entry-level contract with Nashville on December 17, 2007. Earlier that month, on December 2, he set a Giants' franchise record with four assists in a 6–1 win over Portland Winter Hawks. One of the Giants' alternate captains along with forward Garet Hunt, he finished the season with career-highs of 18 goals and 63 points, finishing second among league defensemen (behind Ty Wishart's 67 points in 72 games). His offensive production also set a single-season franchise-record among Giants defensemen for goals (surpassed by Kevin Connauton in 2009–10) and points (surpassed by Brent Regner in 2008–09). At the end of the season, he was named to the WHL West Second All-Star Team, along with teammate Tyson Sexsmith.

With the departure of team captain Spencer Machacek to the professional ranks the following season, Blum was chosen in his place for the 2008–09 season. He began the season with 14 points in his first 10 games and was named WHL Player of the Month for September/October. On November 19, 2008, he recorded his first career WHL hat trick in a 4–1 win against the Chilliwack Bruins. Later that season, on February 7, 2009, during a 4–2 victory over the Portland Winter Hawks, Blum became the Giants' all-time assists leader with his 148th assist to pass Adam Courchaine's 147-assists mark. Nearly a week later, however, he was sidelined with a shoulder injury after receiving a couple of hits from Kelowna Rockets forward Jamie Benn in a 3–2 overtime loss.

Blum returned to complete the season with 66 points in just 51 games to finish third in league scoring among defensemen behind teammate Brent Regner and Paul Postma of the Calgary Hitmen. Despite missing 21 games, Blum was named to the WHL West First All-Star Team, along with teammates Casey Pierro-Zabotel and Evander Kane, and won the Bill Hunter Memorial Trophy as the league's top defenseman. He was later chosen as the CHL Defenceman of the Year over Dmitri Kulikov of the Quebec Major Junior Hockey League (QMJHL) and Ryan Ellis of the Ontario Hockey League (OHL), who were both chosen as defensemen of the year in their respective leagues. In addition to his league-wide honors, he was named co-team MVP with Casey Pierro-Zabotel, as well as the Giants' Top defenseman and Most Sportsmanlike Player. After eliminating the Prince George Cougars in the first round, Blum scored 2 goals and 1 assist in the first 2 games of the second round against the Spokane Chiefs, earning WHL Player of the Week honors on April 6. The Giants' post-season ended in the semi-finals against the Kelowna Rockets. Blum led the team in playoff scoring with 18 points in 17 games.

=== Nashville Predators ===
Upon the Giants' elimination, Blum was assigned by the Predators to their American Hockey League (AHL) affiliate, the Milwaukee Admirals, for the remainder of their 2009 playoff run. He joined the Admirals, making his professional debut, in the second round against the Houston Aeros. Blum appeared in 5 games, recording no points, as the Admirals were eliminated in seven games.

He remained with Milwaukee in the AHL the following season and scored his first professional goal on October 14, 2009, against Hannu Toivonen in a 5–2 win against the Peoria Rivermen. Blum finished the campaign with 11 goals and 30 assists for 41 points, third among all rookie defensemen in the league. He then added eight points in seven playoff games as the Admirals were eliminated by the Chicago Wolves in the opening round.

Blum began the 2010–11 season with Milwaukee for a second consecutive year. After recording 7 goals and 34 points in 54 games, he was called up by the Predators on February 22, 2011.

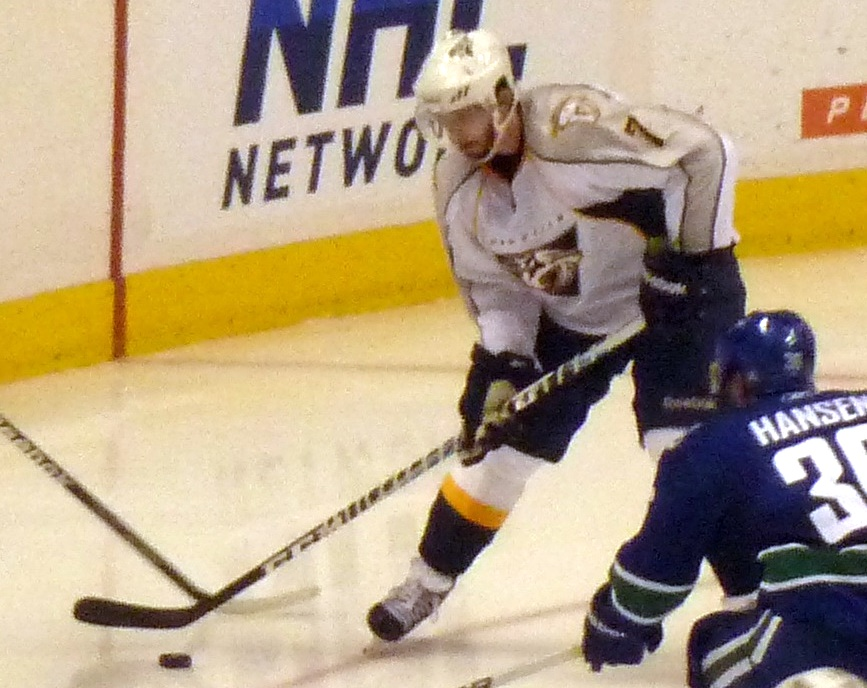
Blum with the Nashville Predators in 2011

Blum appeared in his first NHL game on the night of his first call-up, registering a -1 plus-minus rating in 16 minutes of ice time; the Predators lost 4–0 to the Columbus Blue Jackets. In a rematch with Columbus five days later, he scored his first NHL goal against Mathieu Garon in a 3–2 win. Remaining with the Predators for the remainder of the campaign, Blum recorded 3 goals and 8 points over 23 NHL games while averaging 17 minutes and 45 seconds of ice time per contest. Making his Stanley Cup playoffs debut in Game 1 of the opening round against the Anaheim Ducks, Blum helped the Predators to a 4–1 win with one assist. The following game, Ducks forward Bobby Ryan stomped on Blum's foot with his skate while the two players were tied up behind the Predators' net. Blum was not injured on the play, while Ryan was given a two-game suspension for the play. The Predators went on to eliminate the Ducks in six games, advancing to the second round, where they were defeated by the Vancouver Canucks. Blum finished the 2011 playoffs with two assists over 12 games. Following the elimination, Blum was reassigned to the Admirals for their 2011 playoff season. He dressed for one game, an elimination match against the Houston Aeros in the second round, which Milwaukee lost.

Blum made the Predators' roster out of training camp for the first time in 2011–12. After being made a healthy scratch in two consecutive games, however, he was returned to Milwaukee on December 12, 2011.

=== Minnesota Wild ===
The Nashville Predators failed to tender Blum following the 2012-2013 season. On July 12, 2013, Blum signed a two-way contract as a free agent with the Minnesota Wild.

=== Europe ===
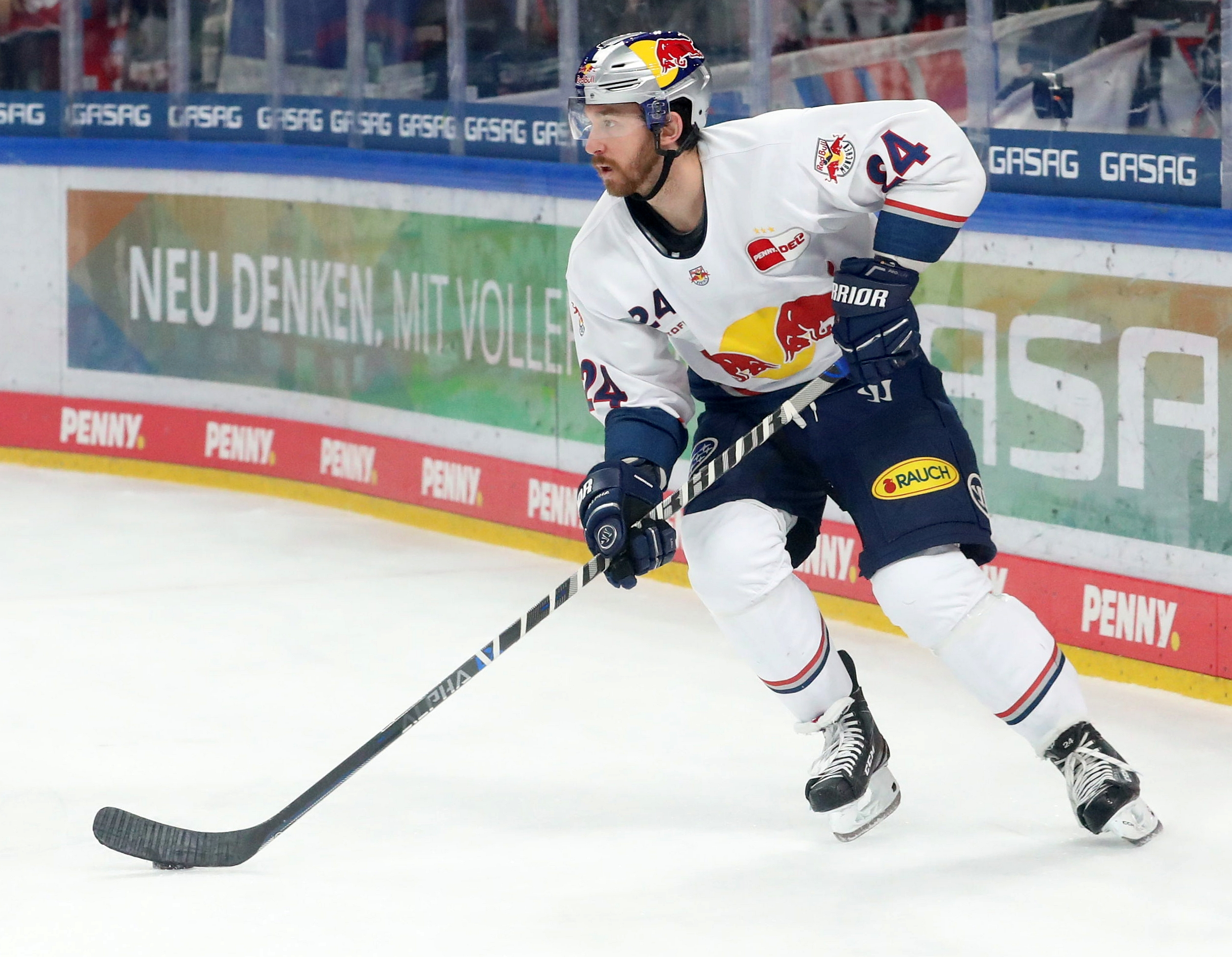
Blum with Munich in 2022

On August 8, 2015, as a restricted free agent with the Wild, Blum confirmed he had signed a contract with Russian club, Admiral Vladivostok of the Kontinental Hockey League.

Over the following four seasons, Blum remained in the KHL, playing with Vladivostok, HC Sochi and HC Dinamo Minsk.

Having completed the 2018–19 season Blum left Dinamo Minsk and the KHL, opting to sign his first contract in Sweden in agreeing to a two-year deal with Färjestad BK of the Swedish Hockey League on July 1, 2019.

After his time in Sweden, he transitioned to playing for EHC München of the DEL for four seasons. For the 2025-26 season, Blum played for HC Pustertal of the ICEHL before returning to Germany the following year with EV Landshut of the DEL2.

== International play ==
Medal record

Ice hockey

Representing United States

Ivan Hlinka Memorial Tournament
Silver medal – second place	2006 Czech Republic/Slovakia	

Blum debuted internationally for Team USA at the 2006 Ivan Hlinka Memorial Tournament in the Czech Republic and Slovakia. He captured a silver medal, as the United States lost to Canada in the final. Two years later, he competed in the 2008 World Junior Championships in the Czech Republic, finishing fourth with Team USA. Set to appear in the 2009 World Junior Championships in Ottawa, Blum was named team captain of the United States. He contributed two goals and two assists in six games, but once again failed to win a medal, finishing in fifth place. He was later represented the United States at the 2018 Winter Olympics.

== Career statistics ==
=== Regular season and playoffs ===
			Regular season					Playoffs
Season	Team	League	GP	G	A	Pts	PIM	GP	G	A	Pts	PIM
2004–05	California Wave	18U AAA	55	15	50	65	65	—	—	—	—	—
2005–06	Vancouver Giants	WHL	61	7	17	24	25	18	1	7	8	16
2006–07	Vancouver Giants	WHL	72	8	43	51	48	22	3	6	9	8
2007–08	Vancouver Giants	WHL	64	18	45	63	44	10	3	4	7	10
2008–09	Vancouver Giants	WHL	51	16	50	66	30	17	7	11	18	6
2008–09	Milwaukee Admirals	AHL	—	—	—	—	—	5	0	0	0	0
2009–10	Milwaukee Admirals	AHL	80	11	30	41	32	7	1	7	8	0
2010–11	Milwaukee Admirals	AHL	54	7	27	34	20	1	0	0	0	0
2010–11	Nashville Predators	NHL	23	3	5	8	8	12	0	2	2	0
2011–12	Nashville Predators	NHL	33	3	4	7	6	—	—	—	—	—
2011–12	Milwaukee Admirals	AHL	48	4	22	26	36	3	0	1	1	4
2012–13	Milwaukee Admirals	AHL	34	1	11	12	16	—	—	—	—	—
2012–13	Nashville Predators	NHL	35	1	6	7	6	—	—	—	—	—
2013–14	Iowa Wild	AHL	54	7	22	29	23	—	—	—	—	—
2013–14	Minnesota Wild	NHL	15	0	1	1	0	—	—	—	—	—
2014–15	Iowa Wild	AHL	66	12	25	37	18	—	—	—	—	—
2014–15	Minnesota Wild	NHL	4	0	1	1	2	—	—	—	—	—
2015–16	Admiral Vladivostok	KHL	55	8	22	30	45	5	0	1	1	4
2016–17	Admiral Vladivostok	KHL	36	2	19	21	20	4	0	1	1	6
2017–18	Admiral Vladivostok	KHL	43	1	18	19	4	—	—	—	—	—
2017–18	HC Sochi	KHL	10	0	3	3	0	5	1	3	4	0
2018–19	Dinamo Minsk	KHL	35	3	7	10	27	—	—	—	—	—
2019–20	Färjestad BK	SHL	51	8	25	33	20	—	—	—	—	—
2020–21	Färjestad BK	SHL	46	3	10	13	10	6	1	4	5	0
2021–22	EHC München	DEL	53	6	28	34	2	11	0	4	4	2
2022–23	EHC München	DEL	55	4	37	41	10	18	0	10	10	6
2023–24	EHC München	DEL	43	8	30	38	33	9	1	5	6	4
2024–25	EHC München	DEL	46	3	29	32	6	6	0	5	5	0
2025-26	HC Pustertal	ICEHL	42	4	22	26	10	13	2	5	7	4
NHL totals			110	7	17	24	22	12	0	2	2	0
KHL totals			179	14	69	83	96	14	1	5	6	10

=== International ===
Year	Team	Event	Result	GP	G	A	Pts	PIM
2007	United States	IH18	5th	4	1	2	3	0
2008	United States	WJC	4th	6	0	1	1	0
2009	United States	WJC	5th	6	2	2	4	0
2018	United States	OG	7th	5	0	0	0	0
Junior totals				16	3	5	8	0
Senior totals				5	0	0	0	0

- All stats taken from Jonathon Blum player profile at NHL.com

== Awards ==
=== CHL ===
Award	Year(s)
Memorial Cup (Vancouver Giants)	2007
Defenceman of the Year	2009

=== WHL ===
Award	Year(s)
President's Cup (Vancouver Giants)	2006
Memorial Cup (Vancouver Giants)	2007
WHL Plus-Minus Award	2007
West Second All-Star Team	2008
Player of the Month	September/October 2008
West First All-Star Team	2009
Bill Hunter Memorial Trophy (top defenseman)	2009
Player of the Week	April 6, 2009

=== Vancouver Giants ===
Award	Year(s)
Team MVP	2009 (shared with Casey Pierro-Zabotel)
Top Defenseman	2009
Most Sportsmanlike Player	2009

== Records ==
- Vancouver Giants' franchise record; all-time assists – 155 (surpassed Adam Courchaine, 147, on February 7, 2009)

== Transactions ==
- June 22, 2007 – Drafted by the Nashville Predators 23rd overall in the 2007 NHL entry draft.
- December 17, 2007 – Signed to an entry-level contract by the Nashville Predators.

== See also ==
- List of select Jewish ice hockey players

Awards and achievements
Preceded by Paul Albers	Winner of the WHL Plus-Minus Award; 2007	Succeeded by Greg Scott
Preceded by Karl Alzner	Bill Hunter Memorial Trophy; 2009	Succeeded by Tyson Barrie
Preceded by Karl Alzner	Winner of the CHL Defenceman of the Year; 2009	Succeeded by David Savard
Sporting positions
Preceded by Ryan Parent	Nashville Predators first-round draft pick 2007	Succeeded by Colin Wilson
Preceded by Spencer Machacek	Vancouver Giants captain 2008–09	Succeeded by Lance Bouma
