= Alfie Evans =

Alfie Evans can refer to:

- Alfie Evans (footballer) (1917–1992), Australian rules footballer
- The Alfie Evans case, a 2018 British legal case involving a severely ill child
