= Alf (name) =

- Gender: male
- Language: Norwegian, Swedish, Spanish, Danish

Origin
- Meaning: elf

Other names
- See also: Alvar, Alfhild, Alva, Álvaro

Alf is a given name, nickname (also Alfie) and surname.

The male name Alf or Alv is derived from álf, the Old Norse for "elf". It is also the shortened form of various Spanish names with álf as their first part, notably Alfred, Álvaro, or more directly from Ataulf (English: Adolph).

There are two kings called Alf in Mellmark mythology:

- Alf son of Sigar, a king in Norse mythology
- Alf son of Alaric, a Swedish king of the House of Yngling

In some cases, Alf may also be derived from Alfons, which does not contain the "elf" element, but is derived from adal-fons "noble-ready". The name day for Alf is 3 January in Norway. Also 21 February in Finland (Finnish-Swedish calendar) and 21 June in Sweden.

The name Alf may refer to:

== People with the given name ==
- Alf Aanning (1896–1948), Norwegian gymnast who competed in the 1920 Olympic Games
- Alf Andersen (ski jumper) (1906–1975), Norwegian ski jumper
- Alf Bakken (born 1962), Norwegian politician
- Alf Brown (1914–2002), Australian footballer
- Alf Clausen (1941–2025), American composer, best known for his work on The Simpsons
- Alf Engen (1909–1997), Norwegian-American skier
- Alf Eriksson (born 1948), Swedish politician
- Alf Evers (1905–2004), American historian
- Alf Hansen (born 1948), Norwegian world and Olympic champion rower
- Alf Hjort (1877–1944), Norwegian-born American electrical engineer
- Alf Jacobsen (1885–1948), Norwegian sailor who competed in the 1920 Olympic Games
- Alf Larsen (1885–1967), Norwegian poet, essayist and magazine editor
- Alf Lie (1887–1969), Norwegian gymnast
- Alf Meyerhöffer (1891–1962), Swedish officer and politician
- Alf Palmer (c. 1891–1981), last native speaker of the Australian aboriginal language Warrungu
- Alf Pearson (1910–2012), English variety performer
- Alf Poier (born 1967), Austrian comedian
- Alf Prøysen (1914–1970), Norwegian writer and musician
- Alf Ridyard (1908–1981), English footballer
- Alf Ross (1899–1979), Danish philosopher of law
- Alf Ivar Samuelsen (1942–2014), Norwegian politician
- Alf Sandqvist (born 1945), Swedish Army major general
- Alf Sjöberg (1903–1980), Swedish film director
- Alf Sommerfelt (1892–1965), Norwegian linguist
- Alf Svensson (politician) (born 1938), Swedish politician
- Alf Svensson (guitarist) (born 1967), Swedish heavy metal guitarist
- Alf Watts (1862–1928), British communist

== People with the nickname ==
- Alf Goddard (1897–1981), an English film actor
- Alf Goonan (1904–1942), an Australian rules footballer who played with North Melbourne in the Victorian Football League (VFL)
- Allan Langer (born 1966), champion Australian rugby league halfback

=== Named Alfred ===
- Alf Baker (1898–1955), English footballer
- Alf Blair (1896–1944), Australian rugby player
- Alf Bussell (1816–1882), early Australian settler
- Alf Cleverley (1907–1992), New Zealand boxer
- Alf Common (1880–1946), English footballer
- Alf Dubs, Baron Dubs (born 1932), British Labour Party politician and former MP
- Alf Engers (born 1940), English racing cyclist
- Alf Farman (1869–?), English footballer
- Alf Gover (1908–2001), English cricketer
- Alf Jacques (1949–2023), Native American lacrosse player and stickmaker
- Alf Kumalo (1930–2012), South African photographer
- Alf Kirchen (1930–1999), English footballer and trainer for Norwich
- Alf Landon (1887–1987), American politician, governor of Kansas and 1936 presidential candidate
- Alf Lythgoe (1907–1967), English footballer and former manager of Altrincham
- Alfred Lennon (1912–1976), John Lennon's father
- Alf Meakin (born 1938), British sprinter
- Alf Milward (1870–1941), English footballer
- Alf Morgans (1850–1933), Premier of Western Australia for 32 days
- Alf Morris (1928–2012), Baron Morris of Manchester, British politician and disability campaigner
- Alf McMichael (1927–2006), Irish footballer who played for Newcastle
- Alf Padgham (1906–1966), British golfer
- Alf Perry (1904–1974), English golfer
- Alf Richards (1867–1904), South African rugby player
- Alf Ringstead (1927–2000), English footballer
- Alf Sherwood (1923–1990), Welsh footballer
- Alfred Shrubb (1879–1964), English middle-distance runner
- Alf Skinner (1894–1961), Canadian National Hockey League player
- Alf Smith (ice hockey) (1873–1953), Canadian ice hockey player
- Alf Steward (1896–?), English goalkeeper and cricketer
- Alfred A. Taylor (1848–1931), American politician and Governor of Tennessee
- Alf Valentine (1930–2004), West Indian cricketer
- Alf West (1881–1944), English footballer who played for Liverpool
- Alf Young (1905–1977), English footballer who played for Huddersfield
- Alf Ramsey (1920–1999), manager of the England national football team when they won the 1966 World Cup

=== Other ===
- James Herriot (1916–1995), British author and veterinarian born James Alfred Wight
- Adam Le Fondre (born 1986), English footballer
- Alison Moyet (born 1961), British pop singer

== People with the surname ==
- Gregg Alf (born 1957), American luthier
- Martha Alf (1930–2019), American artist

== See also ==
- Alf (disambiguation)
- Alfredo
- Alfie (disambiguation)
