= Affie =

Affie may refer to:

- Affie Ellis, American politician
- Affie Jarvis (1860–1933), Australian wicket-keeper
- Alfred, Duke of Saxe-Coburg and Gotha (1844–1900), nicknamed "Affie"

== See also ==
- Alfred (disambiguation)
