= HMS King Alfred (1939 shore establishment) =

1939 Royal Navy shore establishment

Coordinates: 50.8251°N 0.1789°W

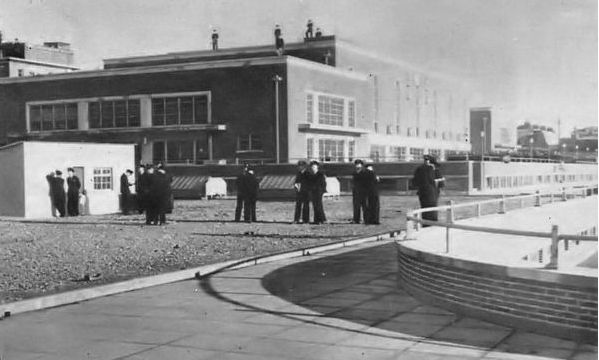

History

- Name: HMS King Alfred
- Commissioned: 11 September 1939
- Decommissioned: August 1946

The second Royal Navy "ship" to be called HMS King Alfred was the shore establishment sited at Hove in Sussex. In 1939 on the outbreak of the Second World War, the Navy was searching for a site for a training depot for officers of the Royal Navy Volunteer Reserve (RNVR). The Sussex Division of the RNVR was based in Hove and its Motor Launch, ML 1649, was called HMS King Alfred and near to the divisional base was a new leisure centre that was just finishing construction. The Admiralty immediately requisitioned the leisure centre and on 11 September 1939 commissioned it as HMS King Alfred under the command of Captain John Pelly.

The first trainees arrived the same day and by May 1940 1,700 men had passed through the base. Most of these were members of the pre-war Royal Navy Volunteer (Supplementary) Reserve (RNV(S)R) (The RNV(S)R had been formed in 1936 for gentlemen who are interested in yachting or similar pursuits and aged between 18 and 39).

With the mobilisation of the members of the RNV(S)R being completed, the role of HMS King Alfred changed to training new officers of the RNVR. This required a longer course as many members of the RNVR had no experience of either maritime pursuits or the "officer-like qualities" required. Longer courses needed more space so the Admiralty requisitioned two further premises: Mowden School, also in Hove and Lancing College near Lancing. Mowden School, taken over in 1940, became known as HMS King Alfred II or HMS King Alfred (M) while Lancing College, taken over in 1941 became HMS King Alfred III or HMS King Alfred (L). The Hove site continued to be referred to as HMS King Alfred or sometimes HMS King Alfred (H).

A training course consisted of ten weeks, the first two weeks at HMS King Alfred II, then six weeks at HMS King Alfred III and the final four weeks at Hove. Upon successful completion of the course, the men emerged as Temporary Acting Probationary Sub-Lieutenants and attended further training at the Royal Naval College, Greenwich before being posted operationally.

Training ended in December 1945, HMS King Alfred II had closed in October that year and HMS King Alfred III closed in December 1945. In January 1946 HMS King Alfred moved to Exbury near Southampton and the Hove site became HMS King Alfred II. This only lasted a short time as the Hove site was returned to civilian use in June 1946 and the Exbury site was renamed HMS Hawke in August 1946.

During its six-year existence, over 22,500 officers graduated from the establishment.
