= Vancouver Giants =

Western Hockey League team in Langley, British Columbia

- City: Langley, British Columbia
- League: Western Hockey League
- Conference: Western
- Division: B.C.
- Founded: 2001
- Home arena: Langley Events Centre
- Colours: Black, red, silver and white
- General manager: Hnat Domenichelli
- Head coach: Parker Burgess
- Website: chl.ca/whl-giants

Championships
- Playoff championships: Memorial Cup; 1 (2007); Ed Chynoweth Cup; 1 (2006); Conference Championships; 6 (2005–06, 2006–07, 2007–08, 2008–09, 2009–10, 2018–19)

Current uniform

The Vancouver Giants are a Canadian major junior ice hockey team based in Langley, British Columbia, and playing in the Western Hockey League (WHL). Founded in 2001, the Giants won the Ed Chynoweth Cup as league champions in 2006 and the Memorial Cup as Canadian junior champions in 2007. The team was based in the Pacific Coliseum in Vancouver, the former arena of the National Hockey League's Vancouver Canucks, until moving to the Langley Events Centre in 2016.

== History ==
British Columbia-based businessman Ron Toigo was granted a WHL expansion franchise for the city of Vancouver ahead of the 2001–02 season. In the following years, the club's ownership group would grow to include Sultan Thiara, former Vancouver Canucks head coach Pat Quinn, the estate of Hockey Hall of Fame member Gordie Howe, and singer Michael Bublé. The team was first based out of Pacific Coliseum, the former Canucks arena in east Vancouver; in 2016, after 15 seasons, the team moved to the Langley Events Centre.

After a dismal inaugural season, typical for an expansion team, that saw the Giants win only 13 games, the team rapidly improved. In 2002, the Giants selected Gilbert Brule first overall in the WHL Bantam Draft—Brule would go on to become the team's first major star player, beginning with winning the Jim Piggott Memorial Trophy as the WHL's rookie of the year in 2004. That season, the team won its first playoff round, defeating the Kamloops Blazers before losing to the Everett Silvertips in the second round. Along with the Giants' improving play, the 2004–05 NHL lockout led to a boost in attendance for the club—nearly 9,000 fans attended the team's season-opener, and the team averaged 8,400 spectators that season; Toigo later stated that the lockout was a definite factor in "putting us on the map". The Giants capitalized by putting together a string of successful seasons that saw the team capture five consecutive B.C. Division titles between 2005 and 2010.

The run of success began with the hiring of former NHL coach Don Hay as head coach, replacing Dean Evason. Then, in 2005, general manager Scott Bonner acquired a number of key players including Kenndal McArdle, Wacey Rabbit, and goaltender Dustin Slade, who, along with Brule, would lead the team to its first championship. In 2006, the Giants captured their first league championship, defeating the Moose Jaw Warriors in the league final in four games, with Brule earning most valuable player honours. The win advanced the Giants to their first Memorial Cup tournament, in which they were eliminated in the semifinal by the host Moncton Wildcats. Despite the loss, Brule recorded 12 points in the tournament, the highest total in the tournament since 1997 and enough to secure the Ed Chynoweth Trophy as the leading scorer.

With the breakthrough of second-year forward Milan Lucic helping to make up for the off-season loss of Brule, the Giants returned to the WHL championship series in 2007 in a playoff run that also featured the debut of future star Evander Kane. In the final, they faced the Medicine Hat Tigers, narrowly losing the series in the second overtime period of game seven. However, the Giants were selected to host the 2007 Memorial Cup, which secured them a berth in the tournament despite their championship series defeat. The Giants secured a spot in the tournament final with an 8–1 semifinal win over the Plymouth Whalers, setting up a rematch with the Tigers. In the final, the Giants avenged their WHL title defeat with a 3–1 victory over the Tigers to secure the team's first Memorial Cup championship. Lucic was named tournament MVP. In 2023, the 2007 Giants team was inducted into the B.C. Hockey Hall of Fame.

The Giants would set franchise records with 57 wins 119 points in 2008–09 and make consecutive runs to the Conference finals in 2009 and 2010. However, after the 2010, the team failed to win another playoff series until they returned to the championship final in 2019. During that stretch, Bonner stepped down as manager after 15 seasons, replaced first by Glen Hanlon and then, in 2018, by Barclay Parneta, who hired Michael Dyck as head coach. In the 2019 final, the Giants faced the regular season champion Prince Albert Raiders; the Giants fell behind in the series three games to one before forcing a decisive game seven in Prince Albert. In game seven, the Raiders won 3–2 in overtime, marking the second game seven overtime defeat in the finals in Giants history.

In 2022, the Giants made history by selecting Chloe Primerano in the thirteenth round of the WHL prospects draft, making Primerano the first-ever female skater selected in a Canadian Hockey League draft.

In 2023, when Michael Dyck left the organization to join the professional ranks, the Giants hired Manny Viveiros as their new head coach.

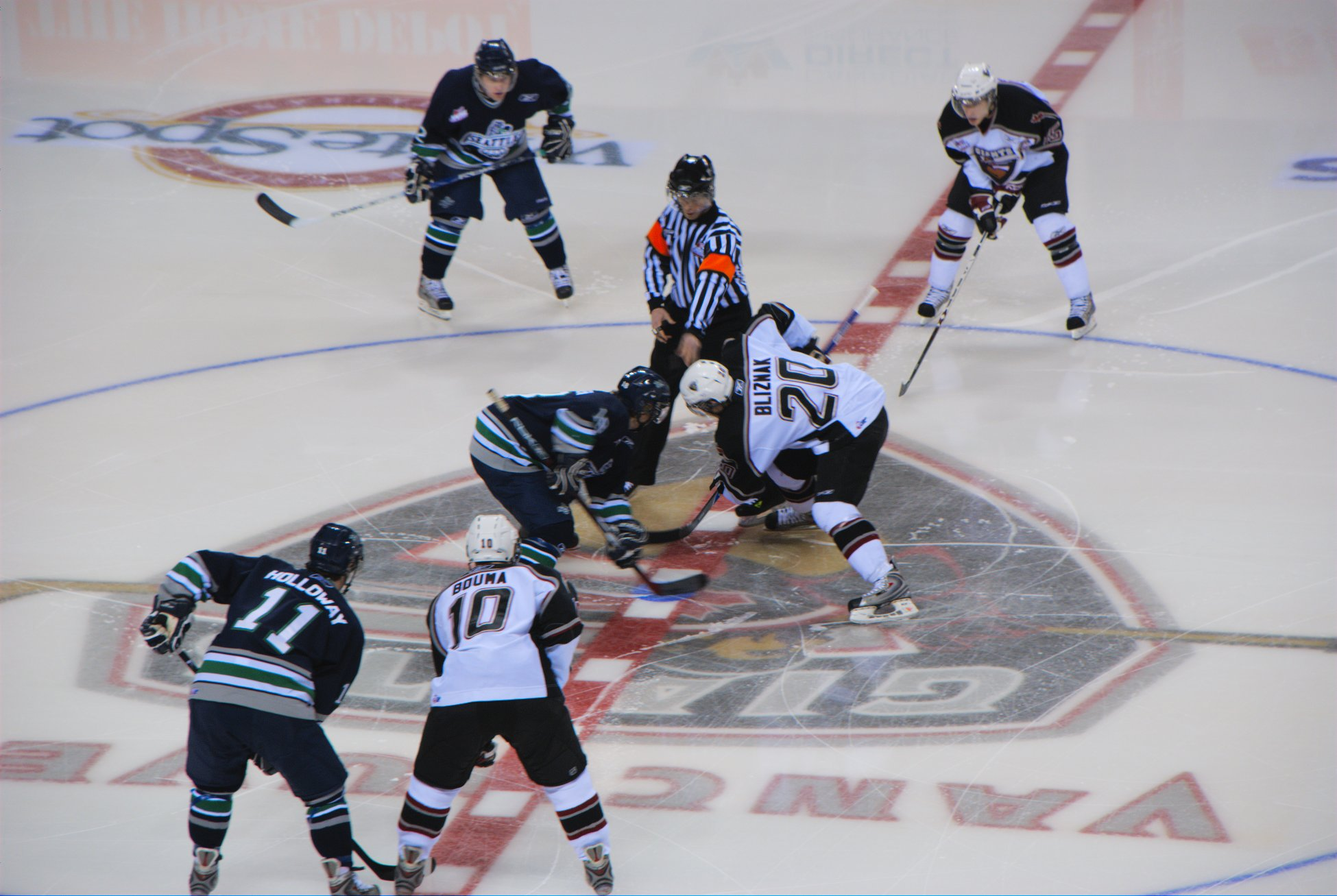
The Giants hosting the Seattle Thunderbirds in 2008.

== Season-by-season record ==
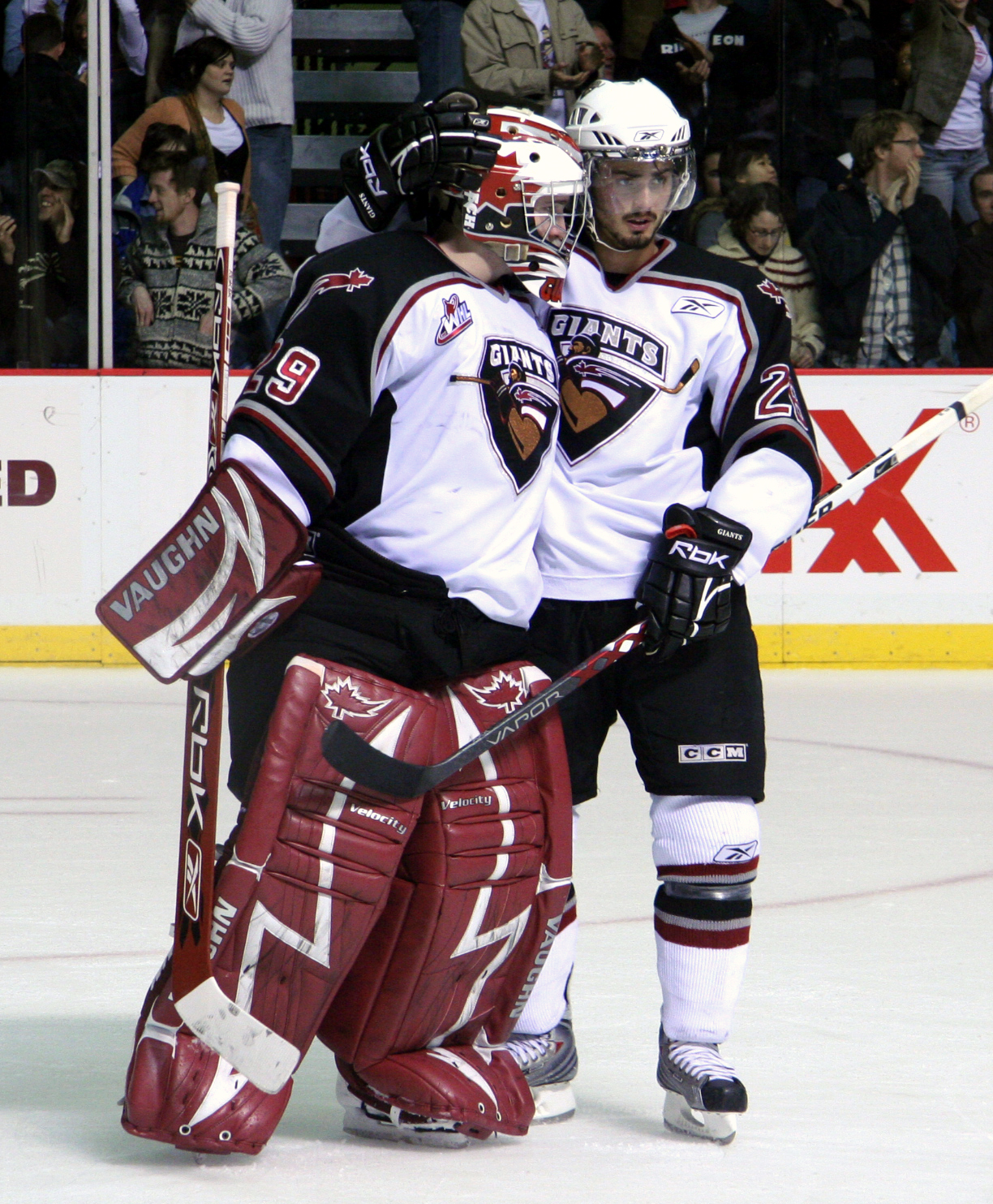
Tyson Sexsmith and Michal Řepík playing for the Giants in 2007.

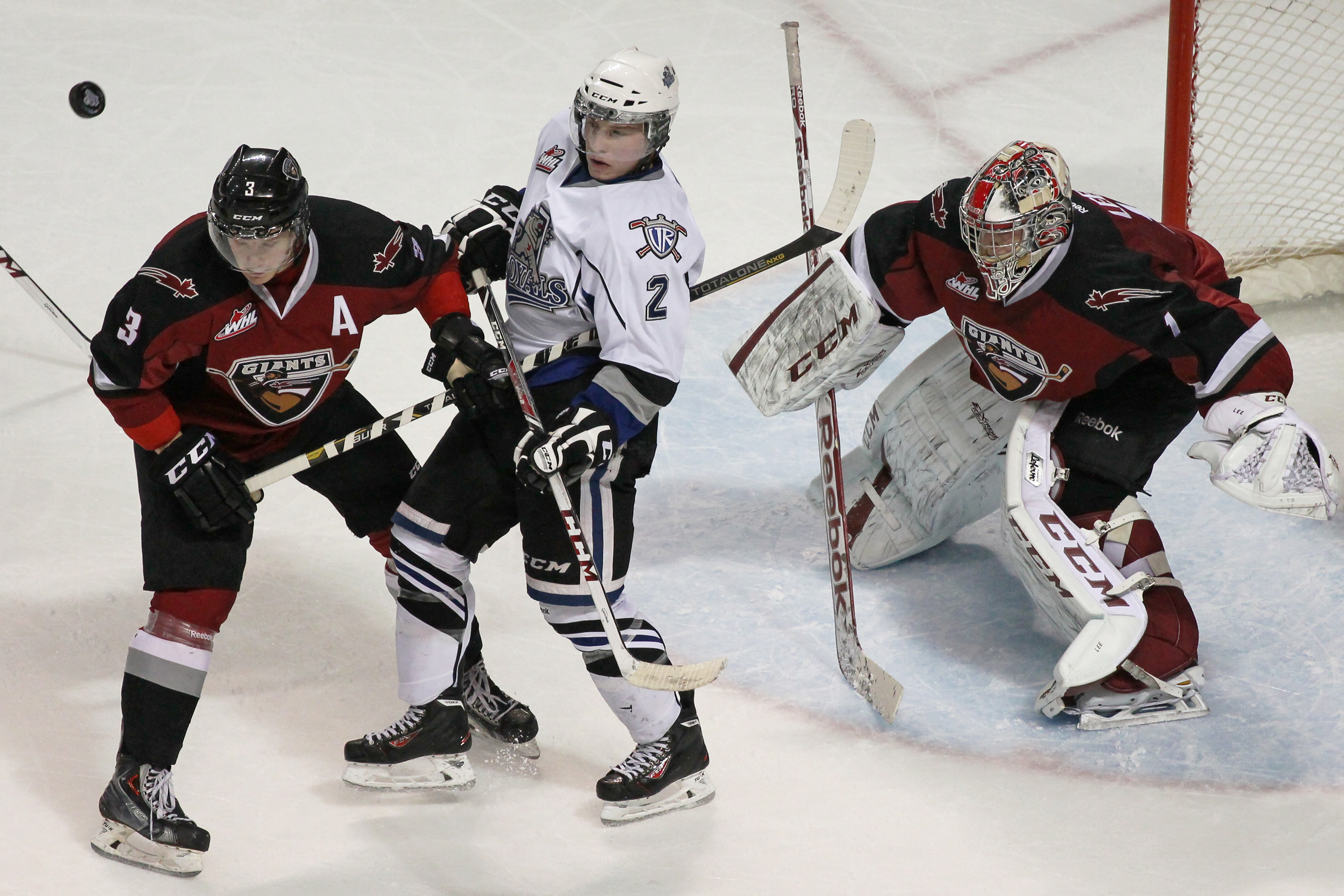
Game action between the Giants and the rival Victoria Royals in 2014.

Note: GP = Games played, W = Wins, L = Losses, T = Ties OTL = Overtime losses Pts, SOL = Shootout losses Pts, GF = Goals for, GA = Goals against

Season	GP	W	L	T	OTL	GF	GA	Points	Finish	Playoffs
2001–02	72	13	49	6	4	198	365	36	5th B.C.	Did not qualify
2002–03	72	26	37	5	4	217	292	61	4th B.C.	Lost Western Conference quarterfinal
2003–04	72	33	24	9	6	215	196	81	2nd B.C.	Lost Western Conference semifinal
2004–05	72	34	30	4	4	212	205	76	3rd B.C.	Lost Western Conference quarterfinal
2005–06	72	47	19	0	6	252	156	100	1st B.C.	Won Championship
2006–07	72	45	17	3	7	245	143	100	1st B.C.	Lost final; Won Memorial Cup
2007–08	72	49	15	2	6	250	155	106	1st B.C.	Lost Western Conference semifinal
2008–09	72	57	10	2	3	319	151	119	1st B.C.	Lost Western Conference final
2009–10	72	41	25	3	3	267	211	88	1st B.C.	Lost Western Conference final
2010–11	72	35	32	1	4	236	251	75	2nd B.C.	Lost Western Conference quarterfinal
2011–12	72	40	26	2	4	255	234	86	2nd B.C.	Lost Western Conference quarterfinal
2012–13	72	21	49	2	0	197	299	44	5th B.C.	Did not qualify
2013–14	72	32	29	7	4	234	248	75	3rd B.C.	Lost Western Conference quarterfinal
2014–15	72	27	41	2	2	189	251	58	5th B.C.	Did not qualify
2015–16	72	23	40	5	4	199	273	55	5th B.C.	Did not qualify
2016–17	72	20	46	3	3	183	296	46	5th B.C.	Did not qualify
2017–18	72	36	27	6	3	233	257	81	3rd B.C.	Lost Western Conference quarterfinal
2018–19	68	48	15	3	2	228	162	101	1st B.C.	Lost final
2019–20	62	32	24	4	2	189	166	70	3rd B.C.	Cancelled due to the COVID-19 pandemic
2020–21	22	12	10	0	0	71	59	24	2nd B.C.	No playoffs held due to COVID-19 pandemic
2021–22	68	24	39	5	0	185	254	53	4th B.C.	Lost Western Conference semifinal
2022–23	68	28	32	5	3	188	238	64	3rd B.C.	Lost Western Conference quarterfinal
2023–24	68	32	32	4	0	222	249	68	3rd B.C.	Lost Western Conference quarterfinal
2024–25	68	34	26	8	0	252	246	76	3rd B.C.	Lost Western Conference quarterfinal
2025–26	68	25	39	2	2	196	282	54	6th B.C.	did not qualify

== Championship history ==
Memorial Cup

Canadian Hockey League champion

- 2007 – Champions
- 2006 – 3rd place

Ed Chynoweth Cup

Western Hockey League playoff champion

- 2019 — Finalists
- 2007 – Finalists
- 2006 – Champions

Western Conference Champions

- 2005–06, 2006–07, 2018–19

B.C. Division Champions

First place in regular season

- 2005–06, 2006–07, 2007–08, 2008–09, 2009–10, 2018–19

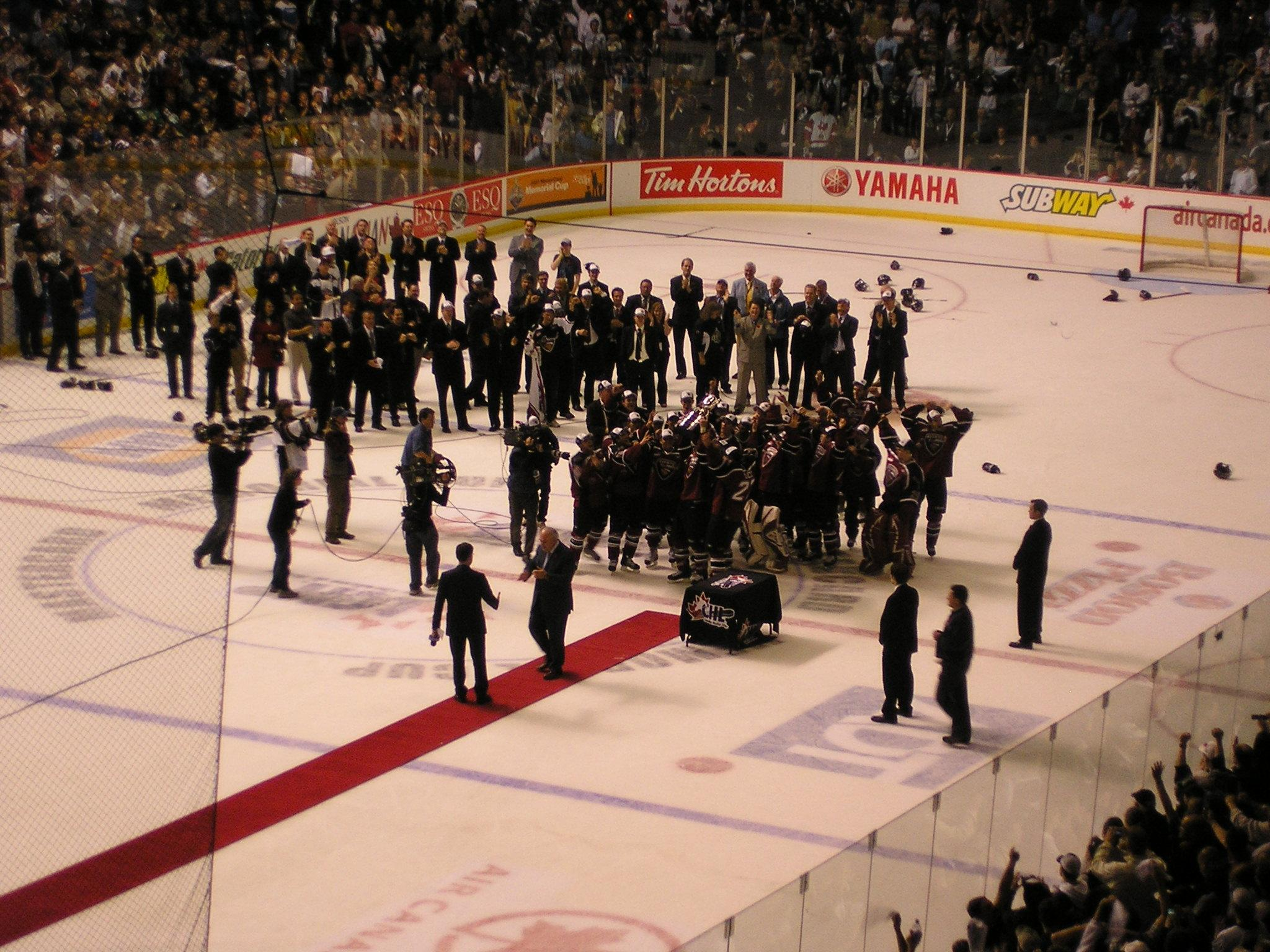
The Giants celebrating their Memorial Cup win on May 27, 2007.

=== WHL Championship series ===
- 2005–06: Win, 4–0 vs Moose Jaw Warriors
- 2006–07: Loss, 3–4 vs Medicine Hat Tigers
- 2018–19: Loss, 3–4 vs Prince Albert Raiders

=== Memorial Cup finals ===
- 2007: Win, 3–1 vs Medicine Hat Tigers

== Players ==
=== NHL alumni ===
List of National Hockey League (NHL) alumni:

- Tyler Benson
- Mario Bliznak
- Jonathon Blum
- Lance Bouma
- Gilbert Brule
- Bowen Byram
- Craig Cunningham
- Brendan Gallagher
- Mason Geertsen
- Triston Grant
- Brett Festerling
- Mark Fistric
- Cody Franson
- Evander Kane
- Matt Kassian
- Brett Kulak
- Andrew Ladd
- Milan Lucic
- Spencer Machacek
- Kenndal McArdle
- Jordan Martinook
- Andrej Meszaros
- Brendan Mikkelson
- David Musil
- Tristen Nielsen
- Brent Regner
- Michal Repik
- Marek Schwarz
- Justin Sourdif
- Nick Tarnasky
- Tomas Vincour
- James Wright

=== Ring of Honour ===
List of players on the team's Ring of Honour:

- Brett Festerling (inducted on December 7, 2010)
- Andrej Meszaros (inducted on December 27, 2010)
- Mark Fistric (inducted on January 23, 2011)
- Gilbert Brule (inducted on January 28, 2011)
- Milan Lucic (inducted on February 25, 2011)
- Cody Franson (inducted on February 17, 2012)
- Evander Kane (inducted on March 7, 2012)
- Brendan Gallagher (inducted on February 15, 2014)
- Lance Bouma (inducted on November 20, 2015)
- Craig Cunningham (inducted on December 2, 2018)

=== NHL first round draft picks ===
List of first round selections in the NHL entry draft:

Year	#	Player	NHL team
2004	28	Mark Fistric (D)	Dallas Stars
2005	6	Gilbert Brulé (C)	Columbus Blue Jackets
2007	23	Jonathon Blum (D)	Nashville Predators
2009	4	Evander Kane (LW)	Atlanta Thrashers
2019	4	Bowen Byram (D)	Colorado Avalanche
2023	16	Samuel Honzek (LW)	Calgary Flames
2026	21	Ryan Lin (D)	San Jose Sharks

== Team records ==
Team records for a single season
Statistic	Total	Season
Most points	119	2008–09
Fewest points	36	2001–02
Most wins	57	2008–09
Fewest wins	13	2001–02
Most goals for	319	2008–09
Fewest goals for	183	2016–17
Fewest goals against	143	2006–07
Most goals against	365	2001–02

Individual player records for a single season
Statistic	Player	Total	Season
Most goals	Ty Ronning	61	2017–18
Most assists	Casey Pierro-Zabotel	79	2008–09
Most points	Casey Pierro-Zabotel	115	2008–09
Most points, rookie	Kevin Connauton	72	2009–10
Most points, defenceman	Kevin Connauton	72	2009–10
Best GAA, goalie	Tyson Sexsmith	1.79	2006–07
Goalies = minimum 1500 minutes played

Note: Pos = Position; GP = Games played; G = Goals; A = Assists; Pts = Points; P/G = Points per game; * = current Giants player

Franchise scoring leaders
Player	Pos	GP	G	A	Pts	P/G
Brendan Gallagher	RW	244	136	144	280	1.15
Adam Courchaine	C	241	126	147	273	1.13
Craig Cunningham	LW	295	86	136	222	0.75
Ty Ronning	RW	285	127	91	218	0.76
Mitch Bartley	LW	280	107	107	214	0.76
Jonathon Blum	D	248	49	155	204	0.82
Darren Lynch	RW	213	81	121	202	0.95
Jackson Houck	RW	268	91	107	198	0.74
Gilbert Brule	C	165	87	98	185	1.12
James Henry	LW	281	62	122	184	0.66
Tyler Benson	LW	190	61	123	184	0.97

=== Awards ===
==== WHL ====
Jim Piggott Memorial Trophy

Rookie of the year

- Gilbert Brule – 2003–04

Bill Hunter Memorial Trophy

Defenceman of the year

- Jonathon Blum – 2008–09

WHL Plus-Minus Award

Regular season plus-minus leader

- Paul Albers – 2005–06
- Jonathon Blum – 2006–07

Doug Wickenheiser Memorial Trophy

Humanitarian of the year

- Ty Ronning – 2017–18

Bob Clarke Trophy

Regular season scoring champion

- Casey Pierro-Zabotel – 2008–09

Dunc McCallum Memorial Trophy

Coach of the Year

- Don Hay – 2008–09

==== CHL ====
Ed Chynoweth Trophy

Memorial Cup scoring leader

- Gilbert Brule – 2006
- Michal Repik – 2007

Stafford Smythe Memorial Trophy

Memorial Cup MVP

- Milan Lucic – 2007

CHL Defenceman of the Year

- Jonathon Blum – 2009

== See also ==
- List of ice hockey teams in British Columbia
