= Alfie =

Alfie may refer to:

== Theatre and film ==
- Alfie (play), a 1963 play by Bill Naughton
- Alfie (1966 film), a film based on the play starring Michael Caine
- Alfie (2004 film), a remake of the 1966 film
- Alfie (2013 film), an Indian short film

== Music ==
- The Alfee, Japanese rock band formerly named Alfie
- Alfie (band), English indie rock band
- Alfie (Sonny Rollins album), album based on the music for the 1966 film
- Alfie (Alfie Boe album), the sixth studio album by Alfie Boe
- Alfie (Carmen McRae album), 1966
- Alfie (2004 film soundtrack), the soundtrack to the 2004 film remake
- "Alfie" (Burt Bacharach song), a 1966 Burt Bacharach and Hal David song
- "Alfie" (Lily Allen song), a 2007 song

== People ==
- Alfie (name), a given name, nickname, and surname

== See also ==
- ALF (disambiguation)
- Alfi (disambiguation)
- Alf (disambiguation)
