= Alfie Cullen =

Irish hurler

Personal information
- Native name: Ailfrid Ó Cuilinn (Irish)
- Born: Alfred Joseph Cullen; 13 January 1913 Jail Street, Kilkenny, Ireland
- Died: 10 May 1998 (aged 85) Freshford Road, Kilkenny, Ireland
- Occupation: National school teacher

Sport
- Sport: Hurling
- Position: Left corner-back
Club
- Years: Club
- Dicksboro
Club titles
- Kilkenny titles: 0
Inter-county
- Years: County
- 1936-1939: Kilkenny
Inter-county titles
- Leinster titles: 2
- All-Irelands: 0
- NHL: 0

Alfred Joseph Cullen (13 January 1913 – 10 May 1998) is an Irish hurler who played as a left wing-back and full-back for the Kilkenny senior team.

Born in Kilkenny, Cullen first played competitive hurling during his schooling at CBS Kilkenny. He arrived on the inter-county scene at the age of thirteen when he first linked up with the Kilkenny minor team. He joined the senior panel during the 1936 championship. Cullen remained as a non-playing substitute for most of his career, however, he won two Leinster medals as a non-playing substitute.

At club level Cullen began his career with Erin's Own before later joining Dicksboro.

Cullen retired from inter-county hurling prior to the start of the 1939 championship.

In retirement from playing Cullen became involved in team management and coaching. As trainer he guided the Dicksboro minor team to three successive championships.

== Honours ==
=== Player ===
CBS Kilkenny

- Leinster Colleges Junior Hurling Championship: 1930

Kilkenny

- Leinster Senior Hurling Championship: 1936 (sub), 1937 (sub)
- All-Ireland Minor Hurling Championship: 1931
- Leinster Minor Hurling Championship: 1930, 1931

=== Trainer ===
Dicksboro

- Kilkenny Minor Hurling Championship: 1951, 1952, 1953
