= Alfi (disambiguation) =

Alfi or ALFI may refer to:

- Association of the Luxembourg Fund Industry
- Alfi (car manufacturer), a defunct German motor vehicle manufacturer
- Alfi's Syndrome or Monosomy 9p, a rare chromosomal disorder
- Alfi, inventor of skipass

== People ==
=== Given name ===
- Alfi Conteh-Lacalle (born 1985), Spanish–Sierra Leonean football player
- Alfi Kabiljo (1935–2025), Croatian composer and musician

=== Surname ===
- Hassan Al Alfi (1936–2021), an Egyptian politician

== See also ==
- Alfie (disambiguation)
