= Alph =

Alph may refer to:

- Alpheus River, a river on the Peloponnese
- Alph River, a river in Antarctica
- Alph Lake, a lake in Antarctica
- Alph, a fictional river in the poem Kubla Khan by Samuel Taylor Coleridge
- Alph, a character from Luminous Arc
- Alph, a character from the game Pikmin 3

== See also ==
- ALF (disambiguation)
- Alph Lyla, the in-house band of video game developer Capcom
