= HMS Alfred =

Four ships that served the Royal Navy have borne the name HMS Alfred:

- HMS Alfred (1778) was a 74-gun third rate ship of the line, launched 1778 and out of service in 1814
- USS Alfred, launched in 1774 as Black Prince, was captured by British warships on March 9, 1778, near Barbados, and served as HMS Alfred, a sloop of 20 guns, until 1782.
- HMS Alfred (1793) was a 8-gun armed brig, hired between 1793 and 1801
- HMS Alfred (1819) was a 74-gun third-rate ship of the line, launched in 1811 as HMS Asia, renamed HMS Alfred in 1819 and broken up in 1865
- HMS Alfred (1855) was a screw storeship, renamed HMS Abundance in 1855, out of service in 1856

== See also ==
- HMS King Alfred
- HMS Royal Alfred (1864)
