= Kevin Connauton =

Canadian ice hockey player (born 1990)

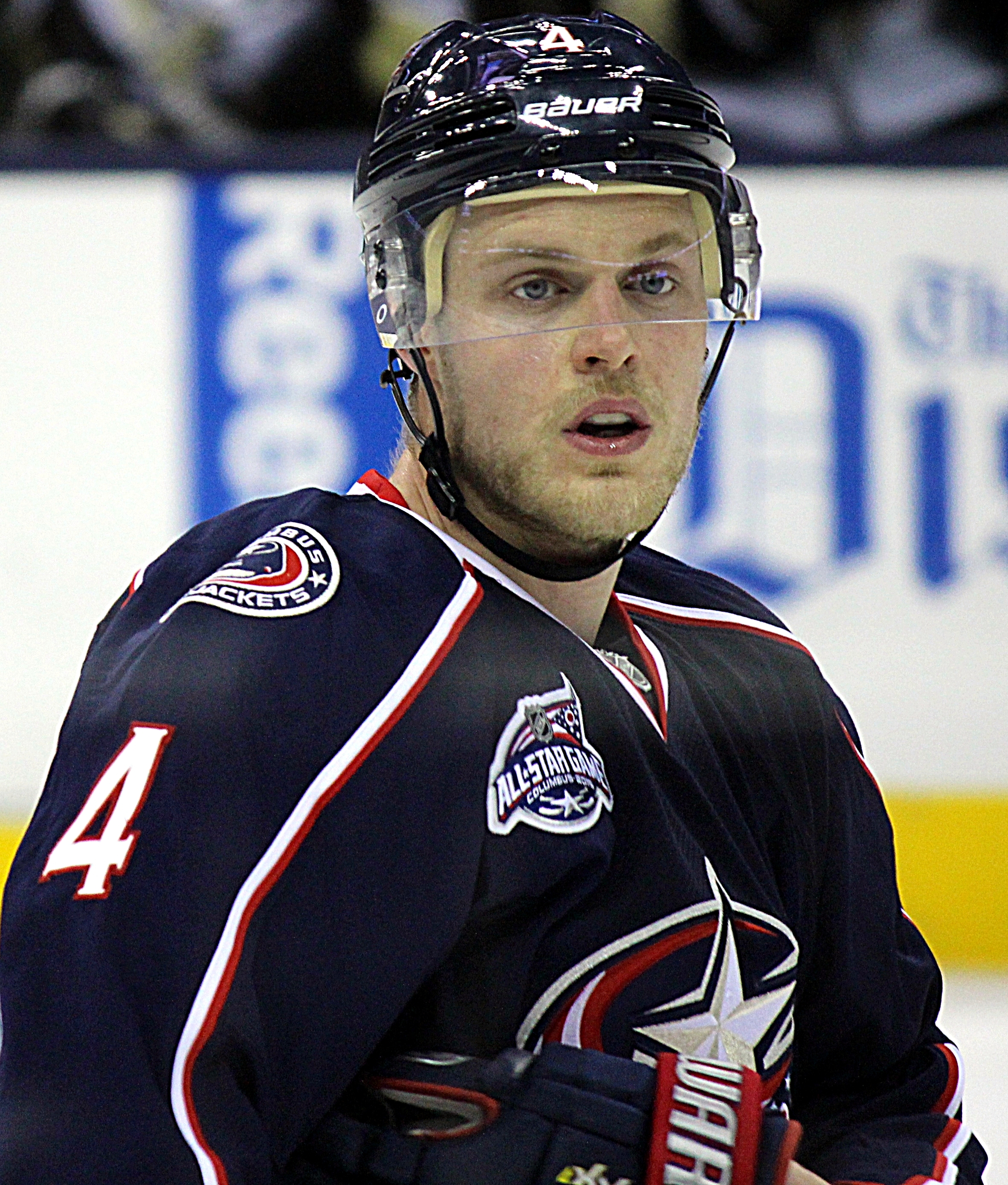
- Connauton with the Columbus Blue Jackets in 2014
- Born: February 23, 1990 (age 36) Edmonton, Alberta, Canada
- Height: 6 ft 2 in (188 cm)
- Weight: 205 lb (93 kg; 14 st 9 lb)
- Position: Defence
- Shoots: Left
- NHL team Former teams: Free agent Dallas Stars; Columbus Blue Jackets; Arizona Coyotes; Colorado Avalanche; Florida Panthers; Philadelphia Flyers
- NHL draft: 83rd overall, 2009; Vancouver Canucks
- Playing career: 2010–present

Kevin Connauton (born February 23, 1990) is a Canadian professional ice hockey defenceman who is currently an unrestricted free agent. He most recently played for the Tucson Roadrunners of the American Hockey League (AHL) while under contract to the Utah Mammoth of the National Hockey League (NHL). He was drafted 83rd overall by the Vancouver Canucks in the 2009 NHL entry draft. Connauton has also played for the Dallas Stars, Columbus Blue Jackets, Arizona Coyotes, Colorado Avalanche, Florida Panthers, and Philadelphia Flyers.

Connauton played Junior A with the Spruce Grove Saints of the Alberta Junior Hockey League (AJHL) before joining the Western Michigan Broncos of the Central Collegiate Hockey Association (CCHA) in 2008–09. He joined the Vancouver Giants of the Western Hockey League (WHL) for the 2009–10 season. Connauton set franchise records for most goals and points by a defenceman, while being named a WHL West First Team All-Star.

== Early life ==
Connauton was born on February 23, 1990, in Edmonton, Alberta, to William Connauton and Glenna Demco. His father, a prominent Edmonton attorney, represented Daryl Katz, the owner of the Edmonton Oilers of the National Hockey League (NHL), during Connauton's adolescence. As such, Connauton and his family grew up supporting the Oilers.

== Playing career ==
=== Amateur ===
Connauton began his junior career in the AJHL with the Spruce Grove Saints in 2007–08. He recorded 13 goals and 45 points over 56 games – first among rookie defencemen and third among defencemen overall – to earn a rookie of the year nomination and a unanimous selection to the AJHL North All-Rookie Team. He garnered interest from the Vancouver Giants of the WHL, who put him on their protected list in October 2008, but opted to play college hockey instead in the NCAA. He signed with the Western Michigan Broncos of the Central Collegiate Hockey Association (CCHA) in April 2008 and initially intended to join them for the 2009–10 season, due to an already full defensive corps. However, after Jesse Perrin departed for the Central Hockey League (CHL) in August 2008, Connauton was invited to join the Broncos for the 2008–09 season. He went on to record a 7-goal, 18-point campaign as a freshman to earn an honourable mention to the CCHA All-Rookie Team.

Going into the 2009 NHL entry draft, Connauton was ranked 202nd among North American draft-eligible prospects. He was subsequently selected in the third round, 83rd overall, by the Vancouver Canucks. He was one of three CCHA players taken in the draft and the highest overall. He was originally eligible for the 2008 NHL entry draft, but was not chosen. Canucks director of collegiate scouting Stan Smyl highlighted Connauton's break-out pass as one of his strengths, while associate head scout Thomas Gradin noted his skating abilities.

Following his NHL draft, Canucks management encouraged Connauton to join the major junior ranks in hopes of bettering his progress. He accordingly signed with the Vancouver Giants of the WHL on July 29, 2009. Prior to joining the Giants, he attended his first NHL training camp with the Canucks, but was an early cut, being assigned to junior on September 16, 2009. Connauton established himself as a high-scoring defenceman in the WHL. He broke Jonathon Blum's record for goals by a Giants defenceman on January 3, 2010, with his 19th goal of the season. He was later named WHL Player of the Week with a four-goal, 10-point effort in five games from December 27, 2009, to January 3, 2010. In the last month of the regular season, he then broke Brent Regner's mark for most points by a Giants defenceman of 67, set the previous season, with two points against the Kelowna Rockets on March 11. Connauton finished his first WHL season atop the league's scoring list among defencemen (he finished with five more goals than Tyson Barrie, who tied him in point-scoring) and rookies with 72 points in 69 games. He was named to the WHL West First All-Star Team, along with Giants teammate Craig Cunningham. In the playoffs, the Giants advanced to the semifinals, but were eliminated in six games by the Tri-City Americans. Connauton recorded three goals and 13 points over 16 postseason games.

=== Professional ===
==== Vancouver Canucks (2010–2013) ====
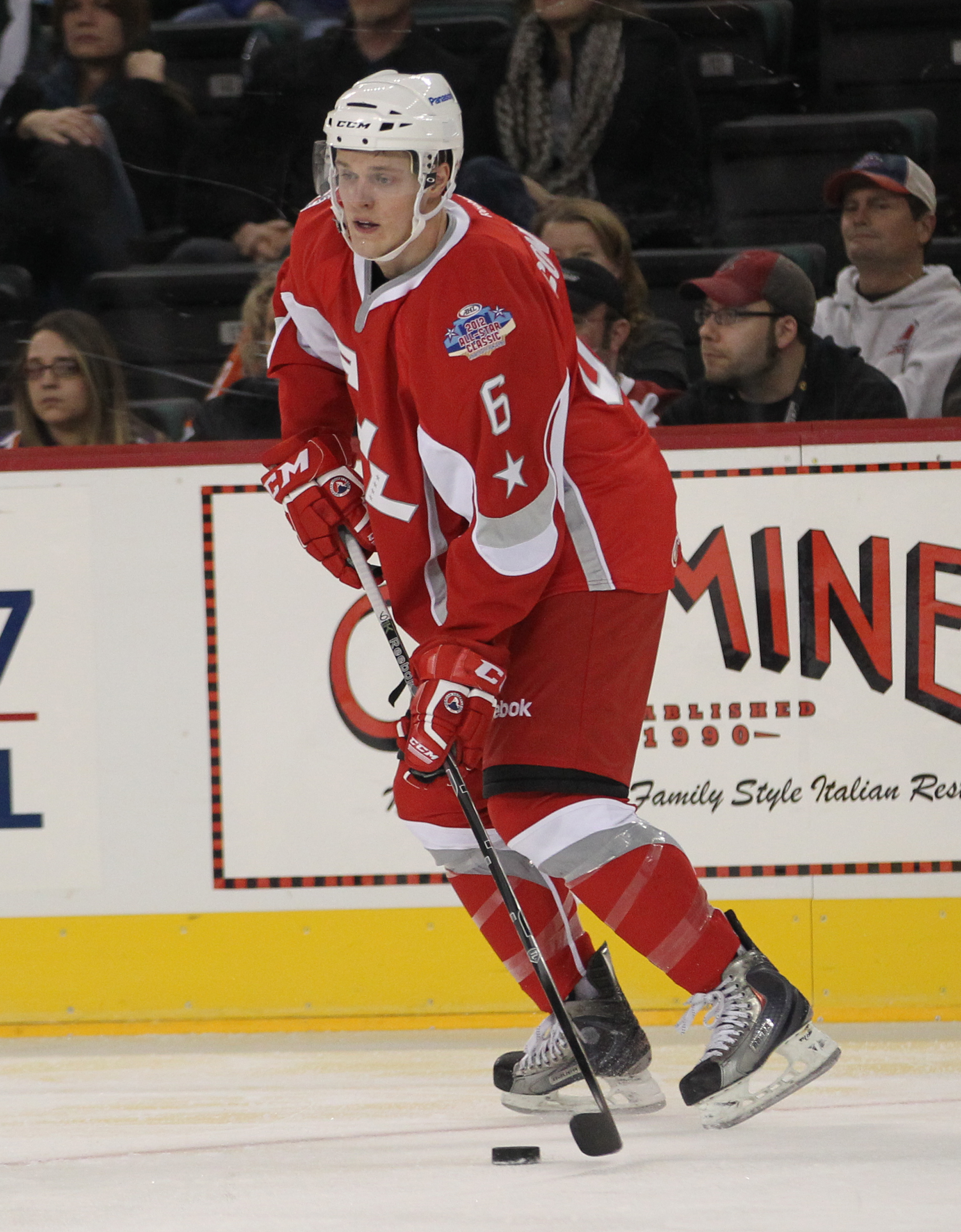
Cannauton at the AHL All-Star Classic 2012

On April 28, 2010, Connauton signed three-year, entry-level contract with the Canucks. He was assigned to the Canucks' minor league affiliate, the Manitoba Moose of the American Hockey League (AHL), out of training camp in September. During his AHL debut on October 8, he scored his first goal, a game-winner against goaltender Ben Bishop in a 4–3 win over the Peoria Rivermen. Connauton finished the season with 23 points (11 goals and 12 assists) over 73 games. He added one assist in six playoff games, as the Moose were eliminated by the Lake Erie Monsters in the first round. The following season, Connauton was assigned to a new AHL team, the Chicago Wolves, who had become the Canucks' new minor league affiliate. At mid-season, he was selected to participate in the 2012 AHL All-Star Game. He was one of two Wolves representatives, joining forward Darren Haydar. During the All-Star skills competition, he won the hardest shot competition, recording a slapshot at 99.4 miles per hour.

==== Dallas Stars (2013–2014) ====
On April 2, 2013, the Canucks traded Connauton and a second round selection in the 2013 NHL entry draft to the Dallas Stars for Derek Roy. At the time of the trade Connauton was leading the Wolves in goals by a defenceman, 7, and was second for points by a defenceman, with 25.

Connauton started the 2013–14 season with the Dallas Stars, and made his NHL debut on October 24, 2013, against the Calgary Flames.

==== Columbus Blue Jackets (2014–2016) ====
On November 18, 2014, Connauton was placed on waivers by the Stars with the intention of sending him to their AHL affiliate. However, before he could drive to Austin, Texas, Connauton was picked up off waivers by the Columbus Blue Jackets. Upon joining the team, Connauton went pointless in three straight games before being named a healthy scratch. Upon returning to the Blue Jackets lineup, he scored seven goals in his first 21 games and had accumulated 16 points by mid-March. As a result of his surprising defensive play, the team traded James Wisniewski to the Anaheim Ducks. As he became a replacement for Wisniewski, Connauton finished the season tied for 12th among NHL defensemen in ice time, including six games when he exceeded 20 minutes.

==== Arizona Coyotes (2016–2019) ====
On January 13, 2016, Connauton was claimed off waivers by the Arizona Coyotes.

On June 27, 2018, Connauton signed a two-year contract with the Coyotes. In the 2018–19 season, Connauton appeared in 50 games with the Coyotes, contributing with 1 goal and 8 points in a bottom six role from the blueline.

==== Colorado Avalanche (2019–2020) ====
On June 25, 2019, Connauton was traded by the Coyotes, along with a third-round 2020 draft pick, to the Colorado Avalanche in exchange for Carl Söderberg. Connauton was waived and reassigned to begin the 2019–20 season with Avalanche AHL affiliate, the Colorado Eagles. Leading the blueline with the Eagles, Connauton posted 5 goals and 27 points through 38 games while making 4 regular season appearances in a recall to the Avalanche. With the COVID-19 pandemic ending the AHL season, Connauton was added to the Avalanche's return to play roster, and made 4 playoff appearances in registering 1 assist.

==== Florida Panthers (2020–2021) ====
As a free agent leading into the pandemic-delayed 2020–21 season, Connauton agreed to join the Florida Panthers training camp on a professional tryout basis on December 27, 2020. Remaining with the team upon completion of camp, Connauton was signed by the Panthers to a one-year, two-way contract on January 14, 2021, and was added to the club's taxi squad. On June 1, Connauton was signed to a one-year, two-way contract extension by the Panthers.

==== Philadelphia Flyers (2021–2023) ====
On December 7, 2021, the Philadelphia Flyers claimed Connauton on waivers from the Panthers.

==== Los Angeles Kings (2023–2024) ====
On June 6, 2023, Connauton was traded to the Los Angeles Kings as part of a three-team deal also involving the Blue Jackets. He played the 2023–24 season exclusively with the Kings AHL affiliate, the Ontario Reign, posting 3 goals and 18 points through 61 regular season games.

==== Utah Mammoth (2024–present) ====
As a free agent from the Kings, Connauton was signed to a two-year, two-way contract with the Utah Mammoth (then the Utah Hockey Club) on July 1, 2024.

== Personal life ==
Connauton's older brother Sean played college ice hockey as a defenseman for Brown University.

== Career statistics ==
			Regular season					Playoffs
Season	Team	League	GP	G	A	Pts	PIM	GP	G	A	Pts	PIM
2005–06	CAC Canadians AAA	AMHL	36	10	11	21	60	—	—	—	—	—
2006–07	CAC Canadians AAA	AMHL	33	11	13	24	79	—	—	—	—	—
2006–07	Fort Saskatchewan Traders	AJHL	1	0	0	0	0	—	—	—	—	—
2007–08	Spruce Grove Saints	AJHL	56	13	32	45	59	—	—	—	—	—
2008–09	Western Michigan Broncos	CCHA	40	7	11	18	44	—	—	—	—	—
2009–10	Vancouver Giants	WHL	69	24	48	72	107	16	3	10	13	21
2010–11	Manitoba Moose	AHL	73	11	12	23	51	6	1	0	1	0
2011–12	Chicago Wolves	AHL	73	13	20	33	58	5	0	1	1	8
2012–13	Chicago Wolves	AHL	60	7	18	25	67	—	—	—	—	—
2012–13	Texas Stars	AHL	9	2	4	6	6	9	2	3	5	6
2013–14	Dallas Stars	NHL	36	1	7	8	16	4	0	0	0	16
2013–14	Texas Stars	AHL	6	0	1	1	23	—	—	—	—	—
2014–15	Dallas Stars	NHL	8	0	2	2	6	—	—	—	—	—
2014–15	Columbus Blue Jackets	NHL	54	9	10	19	29	—	—	—	—	—
2015–16	Columbus Blue Jackets	NHL	27	1	7	8	21	—	—	—	—	—
2015–16	Arizona Coyotes	NHL	38	4	5	9	39	—	—	—	—	—
2016–17	Arizona Coyotes	NHL	24	0	1	1	24	—	—	—	—	—
2016–17	Tucson Roadrunners	AHL	2	1	2	3	2	—	—	—	—	—
2017–18	Arizona Coyotes	NHL	73	11	10	21	20	—	—	—	—	—
2018–19	Arizona Coyotes	NHL	50	1	7	8	22	—	—	—	—	—
2019–20	Colorado Eagles	AHL	38	5	22	27	36	—	—	—	—	—
2019–20	Colorado Avalanche	NHL	4	0	0	0	0	4	0	1	1	6
2020–21	Florida Panthers	NHL	7	0	1	1	7	—	—	—	—	—
2021–22	Florida Panthers	NHL	13	0	0	0	2	—	—	—	—	—
2021–22	Philadelphia Flyers	NHL	26	1	2	3	2	—	—	—	—	—
2022–23	Lehigh Valley Phantoms	AHL	63	3	12	15	49	3	0	0	0	0
2023–24	Ontario Reign	AHL	61	3	15	18	77	7	1	0	1	10
2024–25	Tucson Roadrunners	AHL	56	6	11	17	78	3	0	1	1	0
2025–26	Tucson Roadrunners	AHL	30	0	5	5	27	—	—	—	—	—
NHL totals			360	28	52	80	188	8	0	1	1	22

== Awards and honours ==
Award	Year
AJHL
North All-Rookie Team	2008
College
CCHA All-Rookie Team honourable mention	2009
WHL
West First All-Star Team	2010
CHL All-Rookie Team	2010
AHL
All-Star Game	2012

== Records ==
Vancouver Giants

- Most goals in a single season by a defenceman – 24 in 2009–10 (surpassed Jonathon Blum, 18 in 2007–08)
- Most points in a single season by a defenceman – 72 in 2009–10 (surpassed Brent Regner, 67 in 2008–09)
