= Alfred (surname) =

Alfred is the surname of the following notable people:

- Agnes Alfred (c.1890–1992), Canadian storyteller and noblewoman
- Brian Alfred (born 1974), American artist
- Jerry Alfred (born 1955), Canadian musician
- Julien Alfred (born 2001), Saint Lucian sprint runner
- Mike Alfred, South African poet
- Taiaiake Alfred, Canadian author, educator and activist
- William Alfred (1922–1999), American playwright, poet, and professor of English literature
