= Alex Turcotte =

American ice hockey player (born 2001)

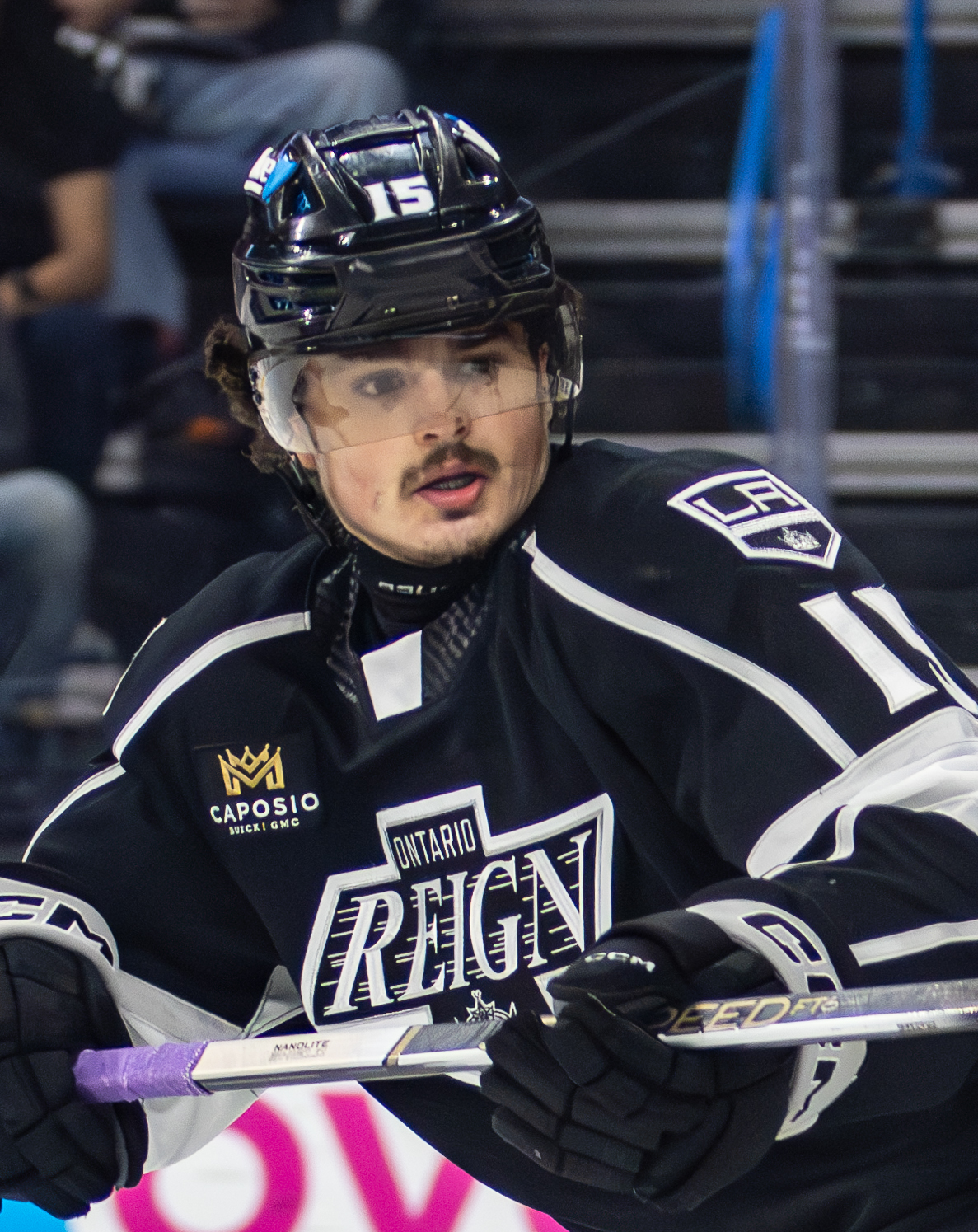
- Turcotte with the Ontario Reign in 2024
- Born: February 26, 2001 (age 25) Elk Grove, Illinois, U.S.
- Height: 5 ft 11 in (180 cm)
- Weight: 195 lb (88 kg; 13 st 13 lb)
- Position: Center
- Shoots: Left
- NHL team: Los Angeles Kings
- NHL draft: 5th overall, 2019; Los Angeles Kings
- Playing career: 2021–present

Alex Turcotte (born February 26, 2001) is an American professional ice hockey player who is a center for the Los Angeles Kings of the National Hockey League (NHL). Regarded as one of the top prospects of the 2019 NHL entry draft, Turcotte was selected fifth overall by the Kings. Turcotte played at the University of Wisconsin-Madison before signing with the Kings in March 2020.

== Playing career ==
On June 21, 2019, Turcotte was selected in the first round, fifth overall, by the Los Angeles Kings in the 2019 NHL entry draft. On March 11, 2020, Turcotte signed three-year, entry-level contract with Kings.

On September 22, 2020, with the 2020–21 season delayed due to the COVID-19 pandemic, Turcotte, along with fellow Kings prospects Akil Thomas, Tyler Madden, Aidan Dudas, and Jacob Ingham, was loaned to Eisbären Berlin of the Deutsche Eishockey Liga (DEL). However, his loan spell was terminated a month later, as there was no timetable for the DEL season to begin.

On December 28, 2021, Turcotte made his NHL debut in a 6–3 loss against the Vegas Golden Knights. On January 31, 2024, Turcotte scored his first NHL goal in a 4–2 win over the Nashville Predators.

On June 22, 2024, the Kings signed Turcotte to a three-year contract extension.

== International play ==
Medal record

Men's ice hockey

Representing United States

World Junior Championships
Gold medal – first place	2021 Canada	

IIHF World U18 Championship
Silver medal – second place	2018 Russia	
Bronze medal – third place	2019 Sweden	

Turcotte competed in the 2017 World U-17 Hockey Challenge where his team won the gold medal against Canada. He assisted on a first period goal in the gold medal game and tallied six points in six games during the tournament. In 2018, Turcotte played in the 2018 World U18 Championships where he scored five points in seven games, but lost the final game to Finland under-18 team, taking home a silver medal.

== Personal life ==
Turcotte is the son of former NHL forward Alfie Turcotte, who played with the Montreal Canadiens, Winnipeg Jets, and Washington Capitals. Turcotte's grandfather Réal played at Michigan State University, once owned and coached the Nanaimo Islanders of the Western Hockey League (WHL), and ran stickhandling camps across North America for more than 50 years. Turcotte's uncle Jeff played for the Toronto Marlboros of the Ontario Hockey League (OHL) and is the head coach of the Los Angeles Jr. Kings under-13 team.

== Career statistics ==
=== Regular season and playoffs ===
			Regular season					Playoffs
Season	Team	League	GP	G	A	Pts	PIM	GP	G	A	Pts	PIM
2017–18	U.S. National Development Team	USHL	31	8	24	32	14	—	—	—	—	—
2018–19	U.S. National Development Team	USHL	16	12	22	34	14	—	—	—	—	—
2019–20	University of Wisconsin	B1G	29	9	17	26	20	—	—	—	—	—
2020–21	Ontario Reign	AHL	32	6	15	21	20	—	—	—	—	—
2021–22	Ontario Reign	AHL	27	6	12	18	20	3	0	2	2	2
2021–22	Los Angeles Kings	NHL	8	0	0	0	2	—	—	—	—	—
2022–23	Ontario Reign	AHL	32	6	11	17	18	2	0	1	1	0
2022–23	Los Angeles Kings	NHL	4	0	0	0	5	—	—	—	—	—
2023–24	Ontario Reign	AHL	35	10	19	29	12	8	2	2	4	4
2023–24	Los Angeles Kings	NHL	20	1	3	4	6	—	—	—	—	—
2024–25	Los Angeles Kings	NHL	68	9	16	25	20	3	0	0	0	0
2025–26	Los Angeles Kings	NHL	62	3	11	14	21	1	0	0	0	0
NHL totals			162	13	30	43	54	4	0	0	0	0

=== International ===
Year	Team	Event	Result	GP	G	A	Pts	PIM
2017	United States	U17	1st place, gold medalist(s)	6	3	3	6	2
2018	United States	U18	2nd place, silver medalist(s)	7	2	3	5	2
2019	United States	U18	3rd place, bronze medalist(s)	7	4	5	9	4
2020	United States	WJC	6th	5	0	2	2	6
2021	United States	WJC	1st place, gold medalist(s)	7	3	5	8	2
Junior totals				32	12	18	30	16

Awards and achievements
Preceded by Rasmus Kupari	Los Angeles Kings first-round draft pick 2019	Succeeded by Tobias Björnfot
