= Jeff Turcotte =

Canadian ice hockey player

- Born: April 24, 1969 (age 57) Montreal, Quebec, Canada
- Height: 5 ft 9 in (175 cm)
- Weight: 160 lb (73 kg; 11 st 6 lb)
- Position: Centre
- Shot: Right
- Played for: ECHL; Hampton Roads Admirals; SuHL; Daytona Beach Sun Devils
- Playing career: 1990–1991

Jeff Turcotte (born April 24, 1969) is a Canadian former professional ice hockey centre who played briefly in the East Coast Hockey League (ECHL) and Sunshine Hockey League (SuHL).

== Playing career ==
Turcotte played three years of junior hockey in the Ontario Hockey League (OHL) with the Toronto Marlboros, including a brief stay in the British Columbia Junior Hockey League (BCJHL) with the New Westminster Royals. He turned pro near the end of the 1989–90 season, joining the Hampton Roads Admirals of the ECHL for 12 games, scoring 7 points. The next season, he moved to the SuHL to play one season for the Daytona Beach Sun Devils, where he scored 54 points in 47 games.

After retiring, Turcotte became a minor hockey coach with the California Wave. He helped guide a team that included defenceman Jonathon Blum, who became the first California-born-and-trained player to be drafted in the first round of the NHL entry draft (23rd overall by the Nashville Predators), to second-place finishes in national Midget AAA and Bantam AAA championships, culminating in an international Bantam tournament championship in Kamloops, B.C., in 2004.

== Family ==
Turcotte's older brother, Alfie Turcotte, is a former National Hockey League player, drafted by the Montreal Canadiens 17th overall in the 1983 NHL entry draft. Alex Turcotte is Turcotte's nephew.
