= John Pelly (cricketer) =

English cricketer and Royal Navy officer

Personal information
- Full name: John Noel Pelly
- Born: 15 June 1888; Ware, Hertfordshire, England
- Died: 6 June 1945 (aged 56); Hove, Sussex, England
- Batting: Unknown

Career statistics
Competition	First-class
Matches	1
Runs scored	5
Batting average	2.50
100s/50s	–/–
Top score	5
Catches/stumpings	–/–
- Source: Cricinfo, 17 December 2019

John Noel Pelly CBE (15 June 1888 – 6 June 1945) was an English first-class cricketer and Royal Navy officer.

The son of Edmund Nevill Richard Pelly and Emma Mary Fowler, he was born in June 1888 at Ware, Hertfordshire. He graduated from the Britannia Royal Naval College and in May 1908 he was a sub-lieutenant. He was promoted to the rank of lieutenant in December 1910. He served in the First World War and shortly after the conclusion of the war he was promoted to the rank of lieutenant commander in December 1918. His next promotion, to commander, came in June 1925. The following year he made a single appearance in first-class cricket for the Royal Navy against the British Army cricket team at Lord's. Batting twice in the match, Pelly was dismissed in the navy first-innings without scoring by Kenneth Mackessack, while in their second-innings he was dismissed for 5 runs by Robert Melsome.

Pelly was placed on the retired list at his own request in June 1934, at which point he was granted the rank of captain. He came out of retirement during the Second World War and was placed in command of the HMS King Alfred shore establishment at Hove in 1939. He was made a CBE in the 1942 Birthday Honours. He continued to command HMS King Alfred throughout the war, before collapsing suddenly and dying at the establishment on 6 June 1945.
