= Alfie (2013 film) =

- Release poster
- Directed by: Thomas Mathai
- Screenplay by: Thomas Mathai
- Produced by: Sreeraj Nadarajan, Thomas Mathai
- Starring: Ashirvad Madhusoodanan, Reshma Malayath
- Cinematography: Sreeraj Nadarajan, Sandeep Nair
- Edited by: Sreeraj Nadarajan
- Music by: Vivian Varghese
- Production company: Meatshop Cinema
- Release date: 2013
- Running time: 27 minutes
- Country: India
- Language: Malayalam

Alfie is a 2013 Indian short film written and directed by Dr. Thomas Mathai.

== Plot summary ==
Alfie is a drug abuser, struggling to keep a career in acting, lost in filth. One afternoon, she and her new lover travel to a remote waterfall inside the woods. Tired with all the walking, she soon falls asleep by the waterfall and is afflicted with a nightmare wherein she is inflicted with harsh torture.

== Festival Screenings and Release ==
Alfie was premiered at short film corner of 2013 Festival de Cannes. It was also screened in the competition section of 6th International Documentary and Short Film Festival of Kerala held in June 2013 at Thiruvananthapuram. A 20-minute version, the dungeon edit was released online via YouTube on 12 December 2013.
