= 1931 All-Ireland Minor Hurling Championship =

All-Ireland Minor Hurling Championship 1931
All Ireland Champions
- Winners: Kilkenny (1st win)
- Captain: John Shortall

All Ireland Runners-up
- Runners-up: Galway

Provincial Champions
- Munster: Tipperary
- Leinster: Kilkenny
- Ulster: Antrim
- Connacht: Galway

The 1931 All-Ireland Minor Hurling Championship was the fourth staging of the All-Ireland Minor Hurling Championship since its establishment by the Gaelic Athletic Association in 1928.

Tipperary entered the championship as the defending champions, however, they were beaten by Kilkenny in the All-Ireland semi-final.

On 27 September 1931 Kilkenny won the championship following a 4-7 to 2-3 defeat of Galway in the All-Ireland final. This was their first All-Ireland title.

== Results ==
=== All-Ireland Minor Hurling Championship ===
Semi-finals

16 August 1931 Semi-final	Galway	10-02 - 0-01	Antrim	Croke Park, Dublin

16 August 1931 Semi-final	Kilkenny	3-06 - 3-01	Tipperary	Nowlan Park, Kilkenny

Final

27 September 1931 Final	Kilkenny	4-07 - 2-03	Galway	Croke Park, Dublin

== Championship statistics ==
=== Miscellaneous ===
- The Connacht Championship is contested for the first time.
- Antrim win the Ulster title for the first time in their history.
