= Advanced Library Format =

IEEE and IEC standard

Advanced Library Format (ALF), also known as IEEE 1603 or IEC 62265, is an IEEE and IEC standard that describes a data specification language for library elements used in ASIC design applications for integrated circuits. ALF can model behavior, timing, power and noise, hot electron, electromigration, antenna effects, physical abstraction and physical implementation rules of library elements.
