= Alfred Island =

Island in Canada

- Location within Nunavut Location within Canada

Geography
- Location: Northern Canada
- Coordinates: 69°52′7.23″N 85°19′51.63″W
- Archipelago: Arctic Archipelago
- Highest elevation: 24 m (79 ft)

Administration
- Canada
- Territory: Nunavut
- Region: Qikiqtaaluk

Demographics
- Population: Uninhabited

Alfred Island is an uninhabited, irregularly shaped island located in Nunavut's Qikiqtaaluk Region within the northern Canadian Arctic. Approximately 24 m (79 ft) above sea level, it is in the Fury and Hecla Strait, north of the mainland's Melville Peninsula, and south of Baffin Island.
