= Agnes Alfred =

Qwiqwasutinuxw storyteller and noblewoman

Axuw (Note: Kwak'wala: [aʔχuwˀ]; the more affectionate form 'Axuwaw' [aʔχuwˀaw] is sometimes used) (c. 1890 – 1992), known as Agnes Bertha Alfred following her baptism, was a Qwiqwasutinuxw storyteller and noblewoman of the Kwakwaka'wakw. Alfred was recognized by her peers as one of the last great storytellers with a long memory. Alfred was born on Village Island, British Columbia. The location of her death is unknown. Alfred was renowned for her hand-woven cedar-root and cedar-bark baskets, and also practiced the art of storytelling. Alfred was keen on relaying her knowledge and her people's way of life using classic oral tradition. In 1922, Agnes Alfred was imprisoned by the Canadian government for participating in a potlatch ritual, which was outlawed at the time. In 2004, her memoirs were published in "Paddling to Where I Stand: Agnes Alfred, Qwiqwasutinuxw Noblewoman."

== Early life and family ==
As a child, Alfred attended missionary school for a short time. It was said that this portion of her life 'deprived her of her cultural and human identity.' Despite this, Alfred considered her life to begin the moment she was baptized as a Christian. Alfred's name was given to her at baptism by bishop Mors. Joe Harris. This occurred much later in life. As Alfred refers to it, she did not 'come to her sense' as a Christian earlier. As a result of this perspective on practicing Christianity, there is little documentation of her life before her baptism. Alfred was already married to her husband, Morris, at this point. All of Alfred's thirteen children were named 'by the book', meaning Alfred chose all thirteen names with biblical reference. Throughout her life as a Christian, Alfred worked to keep alive her Indigenous traditions of potlatches and winter dancing while transitioning her career into a money economy and experiencing the changes of white technology and culture.

== Career ==
Born in about 1890, Alfred grew up one generation behind the practice of slavery among the Qwiqwasutinuxw people. She also lived two generations before oral storytelling began to give way to literature. This gave her unique talent for the art of storytelling extraordinary precedents during the time she was alive. For the entirety of her adult life and career, Alfred was a respected, nonliterate woman who had experienced unthinkable shifts to the state of her people. Throughout this time of her life she maintained her position in the Kwakwaka'wakw nobility, and continued to hone her crafts as a storyteller and cedar basket weaver. Majority of the documentation of Alfred's story-telling career was done in her later life. Alfred experienced practically no western education and spoke no English. Throughout her career as a storyteller, Alfred managed to keep the Kwakwala language alive in both its classical and everyday forms. Some of Alfred's stories were recorded in her later life by ethnographic recordings that collected the Kwakwakewak view of the sea. These recordings of stories told by Alfred related to myths and beliefs pertaining to aquatic mythical creatures, as well as the sea itself. Alfred's career exemplifies the type of knowledge that quickly disappears when language is not in everyday use.

== Imprisonment ==
Alfred's career was storytelling and basket weaving. However, she also worked to protest her peoples' right to potlatch ritual practice. Both Alfred and her husband Moses Alfred were arrested by the Canadian government for participating in potlatch ritual, an outlawed practice, in 1922. Fortunately, Alfred lived to see the return of potlatch ritual in 1978 in the Qwiqwasutinuxw ceremonial paraphernalia in the National Museum of Man in Ottawa.

== Major works and contributions ==
Paddling to Where I Stand (titled from the name meaning 'Many guests are paddling towards me;' i.e., to attend her family's potlatch) is Alfred's most significant piece of work. Alfred documents through imagination and historical accounts the basis of surviving Indigenous life during the turbulent time she lived. Paddling to Where I Stand tells the role of First Nations women as noble matriarchs in a changing society, in context with her own life and personal experiences. Alfred also uses this book to offer a deeper understanding of traditions and practices such as prearranged marriage and potlatches. Alfred includes the significance of knowledge portrayed through songs, storytelling, and chants. Arranged in a lax sequence of events, this book is a raw representation of Alfred's voice, occasionally interrupted by editor Sewid-Smith to enhance the meaning of Alfred's portrayals. Paddling to Where I Stand goes beyond a Kwakwaka'wakw culture interpretation piece. With this work, Alfred contributes her first-hand experience, as a woman, to one of the most influential moments in Canadian history.

While it was not the bulk of Alfred's career, she was an extremely talented and successful cedar basket weaver. The cedar baskets are woven with green and cream twine. Alfred created functional, West Coast open multi-purpose baskets. These are bowl shaped with flat bottoms. The handle ties in this example are worn, implying signs of use.
