= ALF (video game) =

1989 video game

- Developer: Nexa
- Publisher: Sega
- Producers: John Sauer; John Emerson
- Programmers: Kevin T. Seghetti; Jinda Pan
- Artist: George Kanalias
- Composer: Randy Roseberry
- Platform: Master System
- Release: NA: May 1989
- Genre: Action-adventure
- Mode: Single-player

ALF is an action-adventure video game developed by Nexa and released by Sega for the Master System in 1989. It is based on the American television series ALF. Players attempt to control the title character as he attempts to locate parts with which to repair his spaceship, so he can meet up with his friends Skip and Rhonda on the planet Mars.

The game is the only home console game based on the ALF television show. Other ALF games have been released for various computer systems, including ALF: The First Adventure, the first ALF game. A couple of edutainment games based on the character were also released in later years: ALF's US Geography and ALF's Thinking Skills.

== Gameplay ==
The player controls ALF, who must collect the necessary items and solve puzzles to repair ALF's spaceship.

The game features several locations through which players can roam freely: ALF's house, street, basement of the house, ALF's backyard and a pond in the backyard. The player must collect various objects to progress in the game: a stick of salami, which can be used to deal with the bats, a swimsuit, allowing him to plunge to the bottom of the pond, and other objects. Items can be found as the game progresses and can also be purchased through a series of in-game stores.

Bats can be defeated with the stick of salami, while all other enemies, such as secret agents and street cyclists, must be dodged.

== Development ==
The game was a side project for Kevin Seghetti, who at the time was under the employment for Nexa, then integrated with Spectrum Holobyte, who in turn changed their name to Sphere. Although Seghetti was not a fan of the ALF TV Show, he worked heavily on the game's engine. The quality of the code he wrote was an improvement over the Master System version of Monopoly. The artwork was done in Deluxe Paint and converted via a Amiga to become transferable character and map files.

In the later stages of development, ALF was lacking audio and the producer John Sauer did not have adequate game design experience. With only a maximum budget of $200, Sauer managed to find Randy Roseberry to compose the music and sound. With weeks of revision and cleaning up the game's code, the game was shipped by the end of 1989, overruling Sauer's objection due to the crude quality of the product.
