= Alfredo (disambiguation) =

Alfredo is a given name.

Alfredo may also refer to:

- Alfredo (album), by Freddie Gibbs and the Alchemist, 2020
- Alfredo (footballer, born 1946) (Alfredo Mostarda Filho, 1946–2025), Brazilian footballer
- Alfredo (footballer, born 1992), Brazilian footballer
- Alfredo II (Alfredo dos Santos, 1920–1997), Brazilian footballer
- Alfredo Ramos (Brazilian footballer) (1924–2012), Brazilian footballer known as Alfredo

== See also ==
- Fettuccine Alfredo, an Italian pasta dish
