= Alfie Evans (footballer) =

Australian rules footballer, born 1917

Personal information
- Full name: Alfred Ernest Evans
- Born: 9 June 1917; Carlton, Victoria
- Died: 14 June 1992 (aged 75)
- Height: 178 cm (5 ft 10 in)
- Weight: 81 kg (179 lb)

Playing career^{1}
Years	Club	Games (Goals)
1945	North Melbourne	3 (0)
- ^{1} Playing statistics correct to the end of 1945.

Alfred Ernest Evans (9 June 1917 – 14 June 1992) was an Australian rules footballer who played for the North Melbourne Football Club in the Victorian Football League (VFL).
