= HMS King Alfred =

One ship and two shore establishments of the Royal Navy have borne the name HMS King Alfred, after Alfred the Great:

== Ships ==
- HMS King Alfred was a Drake-class armoured cruiser launched in 1901 and sold in 1920.

== Shore establishments ==
- HMS King Alfred (1939 shore establishment) was a training establishment at Hove and later at Exbury. It was commissioned at Hove in 1939, moved to Exbury in January 1946 and paid off in August that year, reopening as HMS Hawke.
  - HMS King Alfred II was a branch of the main King Alfred between 1940 and 1944, being renamed HMS King Alfred (M) in 1943.
  - HMS King Alfred II was the Hove base from January 1946 after the main base had moved to Exbury, until being paid off in June 1946.
- HMS King Alfred (1994 shore establishment) is the Portsmouth division of the Royal Naval Reserve, commissioned in 1994.
