= Alfie Turcotte =

American ice hockey player

- Born: January 5, 1965 (age 61) Gary, Indiana, U.S.
- Height: 5 ft 11 in (180 cm)
- Weight: 185 lb (84 kg; 13 st 3 lb)
- Position: Center
- Shot: Left
- Played for: Montreal Canadiens; Winnipeg Jets; Washington Capitals
- National team: United States
- NHL draft: 17th overall, 1983; Montreal Canadiens
- Playing career: 1983–1999

Real Jean "Alfie" Turcotte (born January 5, 1965) is an American former ice hockey player.

== Biography ==
Turcotte was born in Gary, Indiana, and raised in Holt, Michigan. As a youth, he played in the 1978 Quebec International Pee-Wee Hockey Tournament with a minor ice hockey team from Detroit.

Turcotte was selected by the Montreal Canadiens in the 1983 NHL entry draft. He played for the Canadiens, Winnipeg Jets, Orlando Solar Bears, Baltimore Skipjacks and Washington Capitals. Turcotte represented the United States at the 1984 World Junior Ice Hockey Championships and at the 1986 World Ice Hockey Championships.

His younger brother, Jeff Turcotte, had a brief minor professional stint in the East Coast Hockey League (ECHL) and Sunshine Hockey League (SuHL). Turcotte's son, Alex, was drafted 5th overall by the Los Angeles Kings in the 2019 NHL entry draft.

== Career statistics ==
=== Regular season and playoffs ===
			Regular season					Playoffs
Season	Team	League	GP	G	A	Pts	PIM	GP	G	A	Pts	PIM
1981–82	Detroit Compuware Ambassadors	MNHL	93	131	152	283	40	—	—	—	—	—
1982–83	Nanaimo Islanders	WHL	36	23	27	50	22	—	—	—	—	—
1982–83	Portland Winter Hawks	WHL	39	26	51	77	26	14	14	18	32	9
1983–84	Portland Winter Hawks	WHL	32	22	41	63	39	—	—	—	—	—
1983–84	Montreal Canadiens	NHL	30	7	7	14	10	—	—	—	—	—
1984–85	Montreal Canadiens	NHL	53	8	16	24	35	5	0	0	0	0
1985–86	Montreal Canadiens	NHL	2	0	0	0	2	—	—	—	—	—
1985–86	Sherbrooke Canadiens	AHL	75	29	36	65	60	—	—	—	—	—
1986–87	Nova Scotia Oilers	AHL	70	27	41	68	37	5	2	4	6	2
1987–88	Sherbrooke Canadiens	AHL	8	3	8	11	4	—	—	—	—	—
1987–88	Baltimore Skipjacks	AHL	33	21	33	54	42	—	—	—	—	—
1987–88	Winnipeg Jets	NHL	3	0	0	0	0	—	—	—	—	—
1987–88	Moncton Hawks	AHL	25	12	25	37	18	—	—	—	—	—
1988–89	Winnipeg Jets	NHL	14	1	3	4	2	—	—	—	—	—
1988–89	Moncton Hawks	AHL	54	27	39	66	74	10	3	9	12	17
1989–90	Washington Capitals	NHL	4	0	2	2	0	—	—	—	—	—
1989–90	Baltimore Skipjacks	AHL	65	26	40	66	42	12	7	9	16	14
1990–91	Washington Capitals	NHL	6	1	1	2	0	—	—	—	—	—
1990–91	Baltimore Skipjacks	AHL	65	33	52	85	20	6	3	3	6	4
1991–92	EC VSV	AUT	45	43	61	104	36	—	—	—	—	—
1991–92	HC Lugano	NDA	—	—	—	—	—	2	1	3	4	0
1992–93	EC VSV	AUT	56	26	75	101		—	—	—	—	—
1993–94	EC VSV	AUT	51	26	63	89		—	—	—	—	—
1994–95	SERC Wild Wings	DEL	33	7	40	47	30	11	7	5	12	12
1995–96	Orlando Solar Bears	IHL	73	22	47	69	44	23	3	10	13	8
1996–97	Lausanne HC	CHE.2	42	25	45	70	63	4	2	1	3	2
1996–97	SERC Wild Wings	DEL	1	0	0	0	0	—	—	—	—	—
1997–98	Indianapolis Ice	IHL	17	5	6	11	26	—	—	—	—	—
1997–98	Frankfurt Lions	DEL	26	2	6	8	12	7	0	0	0	0
1998–99	Arkansas GlacierCats	WPHL	2	0	0	0	0	—	—	—	—	—
NHL totals			112	17	29	46	49	5	0	0	0	0
AHL totals			395	178	274	452	297	33	15	25	40	37
AUT totals			152	95	199	294	—	—	—	—	—	—

=== International ===
Year	Team	Event	GP	G	A	Pts	PIM
1984	United States	WJC	7	2	9	11	2
1986	United States	WC	9	0	2	2	8

Preceded by Alain Héroux	Montreal Canadiens first-round draft pick 1983	Succeeded by Petr Svoboda
