= Alf Jacques =

American lacrosse player and stick craftsman (1949–2023)

Personal information
- Born: March 2, 1949 Syracuse, New York, US
- Died: June 14, 2023 (aged 74) Jamesville, New York, US

Sport
- NLL team: Syracuse Stingers

Career highlights
- Ontario Lacrosse Hall of Fame (2011); Upstate Lacrosse Foundation Hall of Fame (2014); Spirit of Tewaaraton Award (2023); North American Indigenous Athletics Hall of Fame (2024)

Alfred Warner Jacques (March 2, 1949 – June 14, 2023) was an American lacrosse player and Native American craftsman known for making traditional wooden lacrosse sticks. He was a member of the Turtle Clan of the Onondaga Nation, and produced over 80,000 traditional wooden lacrosse sticks in his lifetime, earning a reputation as a figure in preserving Indigenous lacrosse traditions.

== Early life and training ==
Alfred Warner Jacques was born in Syracuse, New York, on March 2, 1949, to parents Louis Jacques and Adelaide "Ada" Jacques. He began his craftsmanship training at the age of five, learning from his grandmother how to make black ash wooden splint baskets. Likewise, at age five, he began playing youth lacrosse. By age twelve, Jacques was playing for the Onondaga Miners but he did not have his own stick, borrowing his brother's. His father, an Akwesasne Mohawk, then suggested that they create his stick themselves.

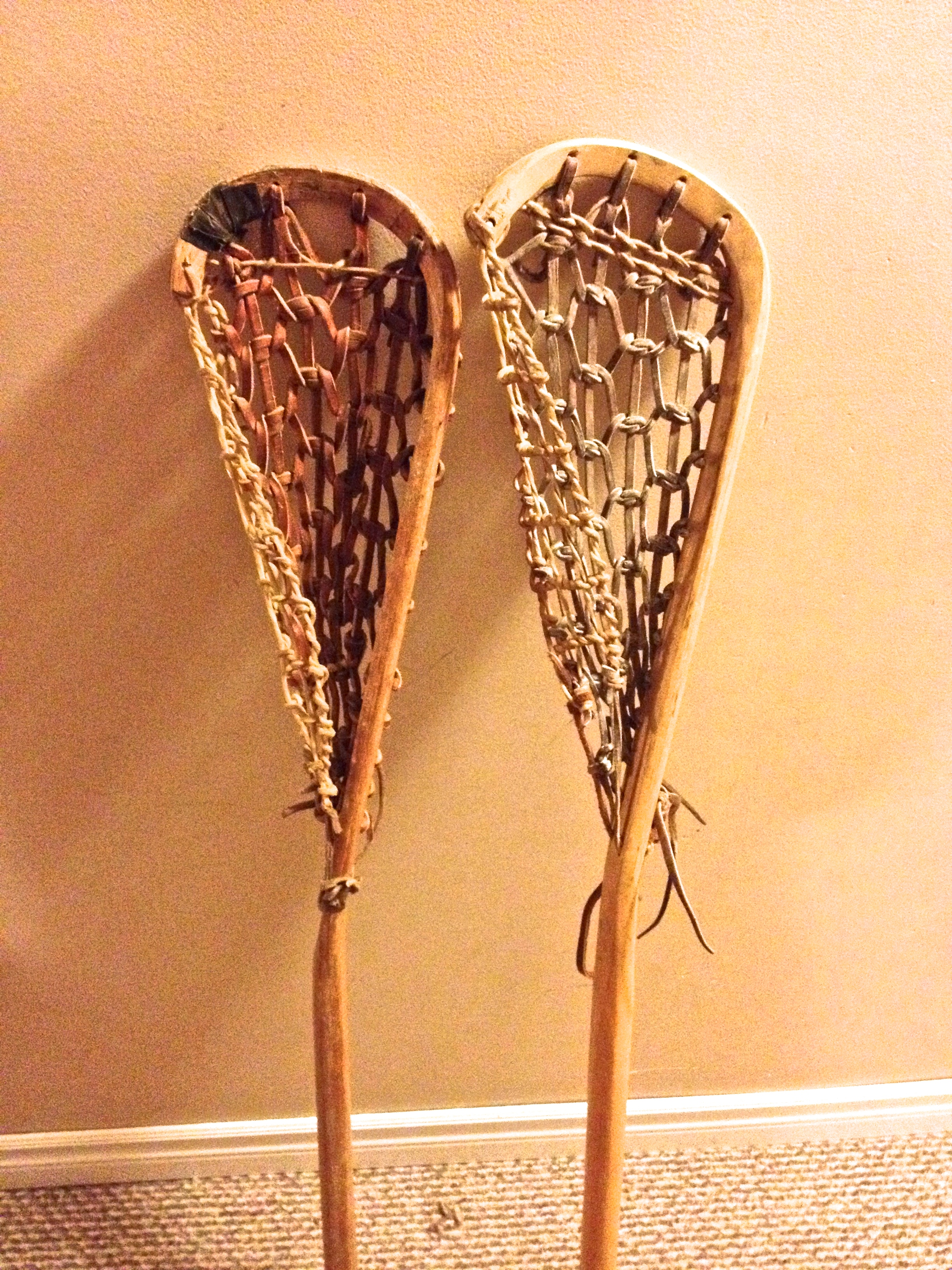
Traditionally strung wooden lacrosse sticks, similar to those produced by Alf Jacques

The father-son duo initially struggled, ruining their first eight pieces of wood. However, they mastered the craft and created a business selling traditional hickory wood sticks. By 1973, they were producing approximately 12,000 hand-made sticks annually. Due to the introduction of mass-produced plastic sticks, their production decreased to 1,200 per year in 1974. After his father died in 1985, Jacques continued to make wooden sticks, with the aid of apprentices. Throughout the 1960s and 1970s, Jacques played for various teams at the junior and senior lacrosse levels.

== Career ==
Jacques worked as a machinist for 24 years while continuing to make sticks. He additionally was known for his environmental stewardship, regularly planting hickory nuts to ensure future generations would have access to the necessary materials for stick-making. In 1974, Jacques played as a goalie for the Syracuse Stingers in the National Lacrosse League, before the team moved to Quebec the following year. He created all of the sticks used by the defense of the Iroquois National Lacrosse team at the 2002 World Lacrosse Championship in Perth, Australia.

From 2004 to 2010 Jacques led the Onondaga Redhawks as a coach and general manager, culminating in a Presidents Cup championship in 2010 with a 13–1 season record. During his tenure, the team made three Presidents Cup championship appearances. In 2011, Jacques was inducted into the Ontario Lacrosse Hall of Fame. Three years later, he was inducted into the Upstate Lacrosse Foundation Hall of Fame. For nearly twenty years over his career, Jacques gave an annual lecture and demonstration of his work at Syracuse University for students studying religion and sports.

== Later life and death ==
Jacques' health declined after being diagnosed with kidney cancer in 2015 and suffering a heart attack in 2017. To assist with his medical expenses, Jack Johnson, an apprentice of Jacques, raised over $40,000 via the crowdfunding platform GoFundMe. Additionally, the Onondaga Nation organized a "Stickmakers Tournament" in April 2023, raising $7,300 to support his treatment. The tournament was Jacques' final public appearance.

Thirteen days before his death, Jacques was awarded the Spirit of Tewaaraton Award, though he was unable to attend the ceremony due to his health. The award was accepted on his behalf by lifelong friend Oren Lyons and brought to Jacques' hospital bedside, where he was able to see it before his death. After a brief hospitalization, Alf Jacques died on June 14, 2023, in Jamesville, New York. Following Haudenosaunee tradition, he was buried with one of his sticks, which would "allow him to continue playing lacrosse in the Creator's Land".

== Legacy ==
Examples of Jacques' sticks are held on exhibit at the National Lacrosse Hall of Fame and Museum in Sparks, Maryland. In 2024, Jacques was inducted into the North American Indigenous Athletics Hall of Fame as a "builder".
