= Boyd =

Boyd may refer to:

== Places ==
=== Canada ===
- Boyd Conservation Area, a conservation area located northwest of Toronto, Ontario
- Boyd Lake (disambiguation)

=== United States ===
- Boyd County (disambiguation)
- Boyd, Iowa
- Boyd, Kansas
- Boyd, Kentucky
- Boyd, Minnesota
- Boyd, Missouri
- Boyd Cave, Oregon
- Boyd, Texas
- Boyd, Wisconsin

=== Elsewhere ===
- Boyd Escarpment, in Antarctica
- Boyd Island, Antarctica
- Boyd River (disambiguation), several rivers in Australia
- River Boyd, in the UK

== People ==
- Boyd (given name), a list of people with the given name
- Boyd (surname), the surname, and a list of people with the surname
- Boyd baronets, two baronetcies
- Boyd Family, an Australian family
- Boyd Gang, a criminal gang
- Clan Boyd, a Scottish clan

== Brands and enterprises ==
- Boyd, an archaic Bordeaux wine producing estate since divided into:
  - Château Boyd-Cantenac
  - Château Cantenac-Brown
- Boyd, an American manufacturer of environmental seals and energy management products
- Boyd Gaming Corporation, a casino operator

== Education ==
- Boyd High School (disambiguation)
- Boyd Independent School District, Boyd, Texas

== Fictional characters ==
- Boyd, a Fighter in the game Fire Emblem: Path of Radiance
- Drew Boyd, from the television series Queer as Folk
- Jonah Boyd, the eponymous character in David Leavitt's novel The Body of Jonah Boyd
- Mr. Boyd, character in Barney & Friends
- Woody Boyd, from the television series Cheers
- Boyd Cooper, in the game Psychonauts
- Boyd Crowder, from the television series, Justified
- Boyd Fowler, from the television series, Dexter
- Boyd Hoyland, from the television series Neighbours
- Boyd Langton, from the television series Dollhouse
- B.O.Y.D., from the television series DuckTales

== Other uses ==
- OODA Loop, a theory of decision making also known as the Boyd Cycle

== See also ==
- Boyd House (disambiguation)
- Boyds (disambiguation)
- Boyd Q.C., English television series
- Boyd massacre, one of the worst recorded instances of mass cannibalism, in which up to 66 people were killed and eaten on the northern coast of New Zealand
- Boyd v. United States, United States Supreme Court case about search and seizure
- Justice Boyd (disambiguation)
