= Boyd House =

Boyd House may refer to:

In Australia

- Robin Boyd House I, a heritage-listed house in Camberwell, Melbourne, Victoria
- Robin Boyd House II, a heritage-listed house in South Yarra, Melbourne, Victoria

In the United States

- Adam Boyd House, Center Point, AR, listed on the NRHP in Arkansas
- Thomas Sloan Boyd House, Lonoke, AR, NRHP-listed
- Boyd House (San Rafael, California), listed on the NRHP in California
- Byron and Ivan Boyd House, Des Moines, IA, NRHP-listed
- Saunders-Boyd House, Hodgenville, KY, listed on the NRHP in Kentucky
- Bird/Boyd Farm House, Byron, MI, NRHP-listed
- Woolverton-Boyd House, Enterprise, MS, listed on the NRHP in Mississippi
- Boyd-Cothern House, Jayess, MS, listed on the NRHP in Mississippi
- Ackerman–Boyd House, Franklin Lakes, NJ, NRHP-listed
- James Boyd House, Southern Pines, NC, NRHP-listed
- Boyd House (University of Oklahoma), listed on the NRHP as "President's House, University of Oklahoma"
- Charles Boyd Homestead Group, Bend, OR, NRHP-listed
- Boschke-Boyd House, Portland, OR, NRHP-listed
- Boyd-Hall House, Abilene, TX, listed on the NRHP in Texas
- Boyd-Wilson Farm, Franklin, TN, NRHP-listed
- William Boyd House, Franklin, TN, NRHP-listed
- Boyd-Harvey House, Knoxville, TN, NRHP-listed
- Theron Boyd Homestead, Hartford, VT, NRHP-listed
- Belle Boyd House, Martinsburg WV, listed on the NRHP in West Virginia
