= Boyd (given name) =

Boyd may refer to:

- Boyd Adams
- Boyd Alexander
- Boyd Atkins
- Boyd Banks
- Boyd Bartlett
- Boyd Henry Bode
- Boyd Clack
- Boyd A. Clark, American politician and jurist
- Boyd Coddington
- Boyd Converse
- Boyd Cordner, Australian rugby league footballer
- Boyd Devereaux, Canadian ice hockey player
- Boyd Douglas
- Boyd Dowler
- Boyd Dunlop Morehead
- Boyd Estus
- Boyd Gaines
- Boyd Georgi
- Boyd Gordon, Canadian ice hockey player
- Boyd Haley
- Boyd Holbrook
- Boyd Hoyland
- Boyd Huppert
- Boyd Irwin
- Boyd Jones
- Boyd Kane, Canadian ice hockey player
- Boyd Kestner
- Boyd Kirkland
- Boyd Kosiyabong
- Boyd Langton
- Boyd Matson
- Boyd Melson, American boxer
- Boyd Merriman, 1st Baron Merriman
- Boyd Morgan
- Boyd Mwila
- Boyd Neel
- Boyd Orr (politician)
- Boyd K. Packer
- Boyd Petersen
- Boyd Jay Petersen
- Boyd Raeburn
- Boyd Rankin
- Boyd Rice
- Boyd Anderson Tackett
- Boyd Tinsley
- Boyd Travers
- Boyd Vance
- Boyd Wettlaufer
- Boyd Winchester
