= Louise Arner Boyd =

American explorer (1887-1972)

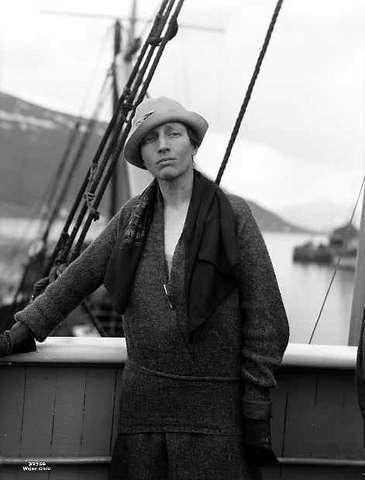
- Louise Boyd in 1928.
- Born: September 16, 1887; San Rafael, California
- Died: September 14, 1972 (aged 84); San Francisco, California
- Occupations: Explorer of Greenland and the Arctic
- Known for: First woman to fly over the North Pole
- Awards: Chevalier Cross of the Order of Saint Olav

Louise Arner Boyd (September 16, 1887 – September 14, 1972) was an American explorer of Greenland and the Arctic, who wrote extensively of her scientific expeditions. She became the first woman to fly over the North Pole in 1955, after privately chartering a DC-4 and crew that included aviation pioneers Thor Solberg and Paul Mlinar.

During World War II, Boyd led a scientific expedition to obtain data on radio-wave transmission in the Arctic regions and worked on secret assignments for the U.S. Department of the Army.

Louise Boyd Land, a mountainous area north of Scoresby Sund, was named in her honour.

== Early life ==
Born in San Rafael, California to John Franklin Boyd (part-owner of the Bodie, California gold mine) and Louise Cook Arner, Boyd grew up in Marin County and the hills of Oakland playing and competing with her two older brothers, Seth and John. The Boyds were leading citizens of the era and their children's early years, though privileged and relatively carefree, included a well-rounded education that was punctuated every summer by an extended stay on their ranch in the Oakland Hills. It was here where Boyd and her brothers rode horses, explored Mount Diablo, fished, hunted, camped, and generally led a rugged and adventurous life.

When Boyd was a teenager, both of her brothers died from heart disease within a few months of each other, brought on by childhood bouts of rheumatic fever. Her parents were devastated and began to lean heavily on Boyd for care and comfort. It was at this time that the Boyds bequeathed to the City of San Rafael their former gatehouse and some of the family property as a memorial to their two sons which is known today as Boyd Park. The Victorian-style gatehouse building is presently the home of the Marin History Museum.

== Career ==
=== Early travels ===
After her brother's deaths, Boyd traveled extensively with her parents making numerous trips to Europe. It was at this time that she developed a keen interest in photography. In the spring of 1919, Boyd took a train to Buffalo, New York, purchased a touring car, and accompanied by her chauffeur, drove across the United States at a time when there was no highway system and roads were often gravel and dirt. This would be the first of many cross-country trips that Boyd would take and detail in her many journals. Upon her parents death in 1919 and 1920, Boyd inherited the family fortune after caring for her parents in the last few years of their lives.

=== Expeditions in Europe and the Arctic ===
In the early 1920s, Boyd used her inheritance to travel. On a trip to Norway in 1924, she saw the Polar Ice Pack for the first time. This experience proved instrumental in her life and she immediately began planning her own Arctic adventure. In 1925, she was presented to the King and Queen of England, an honor bestowed on few American women. In 1926, she chartered the supply ship Hobby, which had been used by famous arctic explorer Roald Amundsen for a hunting and filming trip to the Arctic. She was accompanied by her friends, the Count & Countess Ribadavia. She gained international notoriety for her exploits (and hunting of polar bears) and was dubbed by newspapers around the world, as the, "Arctic Diana" and "The Girl Who Tamed the Arctic". The Count of Ribadavia published a book with photographs by Boyd in 1927 titled, Chasses Et Aventures Dans Les Regions Polaires.

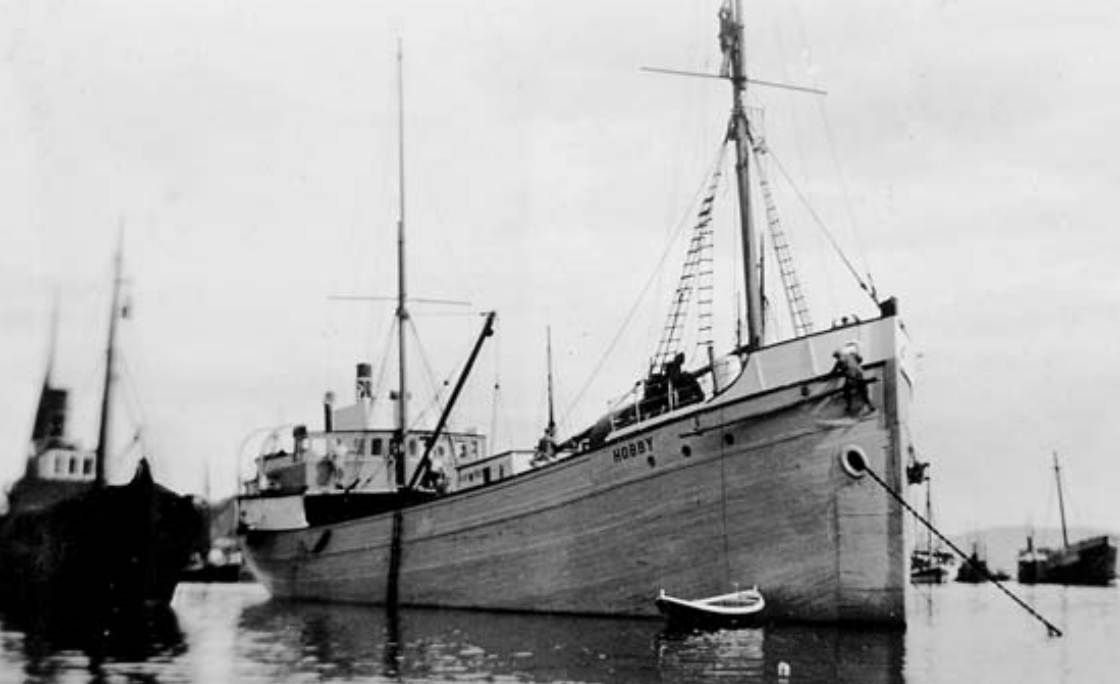
Boyd chartered the Hobby, a supply ship of Tromsø for her trips in 1926 and 1928

In 1928, Boyd was planning a second pleasure trip aboard the Hobby when it was learned that the famous Norwegian explorer Roald Amundsen had failed to return in an attempt to find and rescue the Italian explorer Umberto Nobile whose balloon expedition to the arctic had recently gone missing. Boyd offered her services and the 'Hobby' to the Norwegian government to search for Amundsen, saying, "How could I go on a pleasure trip when those 22 lives were at stake?" Although she traveled about 10,000 miles (16,100 km) across the Arctic Ocean she found no trace of him. Nevertheless, the Norwegian government awarded her the Chevalier Cross of the Order of Saint Olav. "She was the first American woman to receive the order and the third woman in the world to be so honored."

Boyd is primarily known for leading a series of scientific expeditions to the east and north coast of Greenland in the 1930s. Her work documenting glacial retreat, including her use of photography for this purpose, put Boyd at the forefront of the nascent research discipline of glaciology. Her photographs and measurements were also used to create precise topographic maps. In recognition of these contributions, the Danish government named a glacier and an area in north-east Greenland after Boyd: Miss Boyd Land and Louise Glacier. Boyd photographed, surveyed and collected hundreds of botanical specimens, under the tutelage of her good friend, Alice Eastwood of the California Academy of Sciences. The American Geographical Society published her findings and photographs from the 1933 and 1935 expeditions in a book titled The Fiord Region of East Greenland. An area near the Gerard de Geer Glacier was later named Louise Boyd Land. For her leadership and scientific work, Boyd was awarded the prestigious Cullum Medal by the American Geographical Society (AGS) a few years later in 1938.

In August 1934, after being elected as a delegate to the International Geographical Congress in Warsaw, Poland, Boyd set out on a 3-month journey across the Polish countryside photographing and recording the customs, dress, economy and culture of the many ethnic Poles, Ukrainians, Byelorussians and Lithuanians. The journey, by car, rail, boat and on foot took her first from Lviv to Kovel (these towns are in Ukraine today), and then to Kobrin – Pinsk – Kletsk – Nesvizh – Slonim (now in Belarus). She finished the journey in Vilno. Her travel narrative was supplemented with over 500 photographs and published by the American Geographical Society in 1937 as Polish Countrysides.

=== World War II ===
Upon the outbreak of World War II, the knowledge Boyd had gained through her six previous expeditions to Greenland and the Arctic was considered strategically significant to the war effort. The United States government requested that she refrain from publishing the book she was writing about her 1937 and 1938 expeditions, and asked her to lead a geophysical expedition along the west coast of Greenland and down the coast of Baffin Island and Labrador for the Department of Commerce National Bureau of Standards. She was appointed as the Bureau's consulting expert on a dollar a year basis.

At her own expense, Boyd chartered and outfitted the schooner Effie M. Morrissey. This schooner, owned and commanded by captain Robert Bartlett, had been successfully running yearly scientific expeditions to the Arctic since 1926. The principal purpose of the 1941 Bureau of Standards expedition was to obtain data on radio-wave transmission in the Arctic regions traversed. The ionosphere, geomagnetism and aurorae were studied. The Effie M. Morrissey sailed from Washington DC on June 11, 1941, with Boyd leading a scientific party of four men (including a physician) and a crew of eleven under the command of Capt. Bartlett. The expedition returned to Washington, D.C. on November 3, 1941, with valuable data.

During the remainder of the war, Boyd worked on secret assignments for the U.S. Department of the Army, and in 1949 was awarded a Department of Army Certificate of Appreciation.

Her earlier book that had been held from publication, The Coast of Northeast Greenland, was published after the war, in 1948.

== Later life and death ==
Later in life Louise Boyd was an active and well-known Marin figure and hostess while serving as a member of the executive committee of the San Francisco Symphony. She also accumulated many academic honors receiving an honorary law degree from the University of California, Berkeley and from Mills College. In 1960 Boyd became the first woman to be elected to the board of the American Geographical Society. She was also made an honorary member of the California Academy of Sciences. Near the end of her life, Boyd fell on hard financial times having spent much of her fortune outfitting and chartering her many explorations. Eventually, she had to sell the family home, Maple Lawn in San Rafael, and took up permanent residence in San Francisco.

Boyd died in San Francisco on September 14, 1972, two days before her 85th birthday.

== Publications ==
- The Fiord Region of East Greenland. American Geographical Society. Special publication no. 18. New York, N. Y.: American Geographical Society. 1935. p. 369.
- Polish Countrysides. American geographical society. Special publication, no. 20. New York: American Geographical Society. 1937. p. 235.
- The coast of northeast Greenland, with hydrographic studies in the Greenland Sea. American Geographical Society. Special publication no. 30. New York: American Geographical Society. 1948. p. 339.

== See also ==
- List of female explorers and travelers
