= 2002–03 WHL season =

Junior ice hockey season

- League: Western Hockey League
- Sport: Ice hockey
- Teams: 19

Regular season
- Scotty Munro Memorial Trophy: Kelowna Rockets (1)
- Season MVP: Josh Harding (Regina Pats)
- Top scorer: Erik Christensen (Kamloops Blazers)

Playoffs
- Playoffs MVP: Jesse Schultz (Rockets)
- Finals champions: Kelowna Rockets (1)
- Runners-up: Red Deer Rebels

WHL seasons
- 2001–02 2003–04

2002–03 CHL season
- League: Canadian Hockey League
- Sport: Ice hockey
- Teams: 55

OHL

QMJHL

WHL

Memorial Cup
- Finals champions: Kitchener Rangers (OHL) (2nd title)
- Runners-up: Hull Olympiques (QMJHL)

The 2002–03 WHL season was the 37th season of the Western Hockey League (WHL). Nineteen teams completed a 72-game season. The Kelowna Rockets won both the Scotty Munro Memorial Trophy as the league's best regular season team and the President's Cup as playoff champion, both for the first time. The Rockets thus earned a berth in the 2003 Memorial Cup tournament.

== Regular season ==
Map of WHL, 2001–02 to 2002–03
East Division
Central Division
BC Division
US Division

=== Final standings ===
==== Eastern Conference ====
East Division
Pos	Team	Pld	W	L	T	OTL	GF	GA	Pts
1	x – Brandon Wheat Kings	72	43	17	9	3	258	187	98
2	x – Moose Jaw Warriors	72	36	22	11	3	266	208	86
3	x – Saskatoon Blades	72	40	27	5	0	234	205	85
4	x – Regina Pats	72	25	28	14	5	171	217	69
5	Prince Albert Raiders	72	27	37	3	5	185	258	62

x – qualified for playoffs

Central Division
Pos	Team	Pld	W	L	T	OTL	GF	GA	Pts
1	x – Red Deer Rebels	72	50	17	3	2	271	160	105
2	x – Swift Current Broncos	72	38	24	7	3	240	215	86
3	x – Medicine Hat Tigers	72	29	34	2	7	278	314	67
4	x – Calgary Hitmen	72	27	36	7	2	240	260	63
5	Lethbridge Hurricanes	72	28	39	2	3	236	303	61

x – qualified for playoffs

==== Western Conference ====
B.C. Division
Pos	Team	Pld	W	L	T	OTL	GF	GA	Pts
1	x – Kelowna Rockets	72	51	14	6	1	311	164	109
2	x – Kamloops Blazers	72	39	27	5	1	261	222	84
3	x – Kootenay Ice	72	36	25	6	5	234	202	83
4	x – Vancouver Giants	72	26	37	5	4	217	292	61
5	x – Prince George Cougars (Note: Prince George crosses over into U.S. Division playoffs)	72	26	41	3	2	257	317	57

x – qualified for playoffs
Notes:

U.S. Division
Pos	Team	Pld	W	L	T	OTL	GF	GA	Pts
1	x – Seattle Thunderbirds	72	44	22	3	3	280	224	94
2	x – Spokane Chiefs	72	26	36	6	4	216	261	62
3	x – Portland Winter Hawks	72	19	40	8	5	192	243	51
4	Tri-City Americans	72	20	44	3	5	240	335	48

x – qualified for playoffs

=== Scoring leaders ===
Note: GP = Games played; G = Goals; A = Assists; Pts = Points; PIM = Penalties in minutes

Player	Team	GP	G	A	Pts	PIM
Erik Christensen	Kamloops Blazers	67	54	54	108	60
Jesse Schultz	Kelowna Rockets	72	53	51	104	47
Jeremy Jackson	Lethbridge Hurricanes	65	44	58	102	83
Matt Ellison	Red Deer Rebels	72	40	56	96	80
Chris St. Jaques	Medicine Hat Tigers	70	31	65	96	78
Brooks Laich	Seattle Thunderbirds	60	41	53	94	65
Jeremy Williams	Swift Current Broncos	72	41	52	93	117
Dylan Stanley	Tri-City Americans	72	34	59	93	60
David Bararuk	Moose Jaw Warriors	66	29	64	93	44
Nigel Dawes	Kootenay Ice	72	47	45	92	54

=== Goaltending leaders ===
Note: GP = Games played; Min = Minutes played; W = Wins; L = Losses; T = Ties; GA = Goals against; SO = Total shutouts; SV% = Save percentage; GAA = Goals against average

Player	Team	GP	Min	W	L	T	GA	SO	SV%	GAA
Kelly Guard	Kelowna Rockets	53	3018	39	10	3	97	6	.911	1.93
Geoff McIntosh	Brandon Wheat Kings	23	1337	12	6	4	46	2	.914	2.06
Cam Ward	Red Deer Rebels	57	3367	40	13	2	118	5	.920	2.10
Jeff Glass	Kootenay Ice	35	1884	15	16	2	77	4	.909	2.45
Blake Grenier	Moose Jaw Warriors	41	2356	23	8	8	100	5	.911	2.55

== 2003 WHL Playoffs ==
Conference Quarter-finals	Conference Semi-finals
E1	Brandon	4
E4	Regina	1
C1	Red Deer	4
C3	Medicine Hat	3
E2	Moose Jaw	4
E3	Saskatoon	2
Eastern
C1	Red Deer	4
C4	Calgary	1
E1	Brandon	4
E2	Moose Jaw	3
C2	Swift Current	0
C3	Medicine Hat	4
B1	Kelowna	4
B4	Vancouver	0
B1	Kelowna	4
U2	Spokane	0
B2	Kamloops	2
B3	Kootenay	4
Western
U1	Seattle	4
B5	Prince George	1
U1	Seattle	4
B3	Kootenay	1
U2	Spokane	4
U3	Portland	3

Conference Finals
E1	Brandon	1
C1	Red Deer	4
B1	Kelowna	4
U1	Seattle	1

WHL Championship
C1	Red Deer	2
B1	Kelowna	4

=== Conference quarterfinals ===
==== Eastern Conference ====
Brandon vs. Regina
Date	Away	Home	
March 21	Regina 1	3 Brandon	
March 22	Regina 2	1 Brandon	OT
March 25	Brandon 3	1 Regina	
March 26	Brandon 2	1 Regina	OT
March 28	Regina 2	4 Brandon	
Brandon wins series 4–1

Red Deer vs. Calgary
Date	Away	Home
March 21	Calgary 0	2 Red Deer
March 22	Calgary 2	3 Red Deer
March 25	Red Deer 4	2 Calgary
March 26	Red Deer 1	2 Calgary
March 29	Calgary 3	4 Red Deer
Red Deer wins series 4–1

Moose Jaw vs. Saskatoon
Date	Away	Home	
March 21	Saskatoon 3	0 Moose Jaw	
March 22	Saskatoon 4	5 Moose Jaw	
March 25	Moose Jaw 3	5 Saskatoon	
March 26	Moose Jaw 3	2 Saskatoon	OT
March 29	Saskatoon 1	3 Moose Jaw	
March 31	Moose Jaw 5	3 Saskatoon	
Moose Jaw wins series 4–2

Swift Current vs. Medicine Hat
Date	Away	Home	
March 21	Medicine Hat 3	2 Swift Current	OT
March 22	Medicine Hat 4	2 Swift Current	
March 25	Swift Current 3	6 Medicine Hat	
March 26	Swift Current 1	7 Medicine Hat	
Medicine Hat wins series 4–0

==== Western Conference ====
Kelowna vs. Vancouver
Date	Away	Home	
March 22	Vancouver 0	10 Kelowna	
March 23	Vancouver 3	4 Kelowna	2OT
March 26	Kelowna 2	0 Vancouver	
March 27	Kelowna 8	2 Vancouver	
Kelowna wins series 4–0

Seattle vs. Prince George
Date	Away	Home
March 22	Prince George 1	4 Seattle
March 23	Prince George 3	7 Seattle
March 26	Seattle 2	4 Prince George
March 27	Seattle 3	1 Prince George
March 29	Prince George 3	4 Seattle
Seattle wins series 4–1

Kamloops vs. Kootenay
Date	Away	Home	
March 21	Kootenay 2	1 Kamloops	OT
March 22	Kootenay 0	1 Kamloops	
March 25	Kamloops 2	3 Kootenay	4OT
March 26	Kamloops 1	4 Kootenay	
March 29	Kootenay 6	7 Kamloops	
March 31	Kamloops 1	2 Kootenay	2OT
Kootenay wins series 4–2

Spokane vs. Portland
Date	Away	Home	
March 21	Spokane 2	4 Portland	
March 23	Spokane 1	3 Portland	
March 26	Portland 3	4 Spokane	OT
March 28	Portland 2	1 Spokane	2OT
March 29	Portland 3	8 Spokane	
March 31	Spokane 3	2 Portland	OT
April 2	Portland 2	4 Spokane	
Spokane wins series 4–3

=== Conference semifinals ===
Eastern Conference

Red Deer vs. Medicine Hat
Date	Away	Home	
April 4	Medicine Hat 2	6 Red Deer	
April 5	Medicine Hat 0	3 Red Deer	
April 8	Red Deer 3	4 Medicine Hat	
April 9	Red Deer 3	6 Medicine Hat	
April 11	Medicine Hat 2	4 Red Deer	
April 13	Red Deer 2	3 Medicine Hat	2OT
April 15	Medicine Hat 1	5 Red Deer	
Red Deer wins series 4–3

Brandon vs. Moose Jaw
Date	Away	Home	
April 4	Brandon 2	3 Moose Jaw	
April 5	Brandon 2	1 Moose Jaw	
April 9	Moose Jaw 5	3 Brandon	
April 11	Moose Jaw 1	4 Brandon	
April 12	Moose Jaw 1	2 Brandon	
April 14	Brandon 6	7 Moose Jaw	OT
April 16	Moose Jaw 3	7 Brandon	
Brandon wins series 4–3

Western Conference

Kelowna vs. Spokane
Date	Away	Home	
April 4	Spokane 1	6 Kelowna	
April 5	Spokane 1	5 Kelowna	
April 9	Kelowna 4	1 Spokane	
April 11	Kelowna 4	3 Spokane	OT
Kelowna wins series 4–0

Seattle vs. Kootenay
Date	Away	Home	
April 5	Kootenay 2	4 Seattle	
April 7	Kootenay 0	4 Seattle	
April 9	Seattle 5	0 Kootenay	
April 10	Seattle 1	2 Kootenay	2OT
April 12	Kootenay 1	2 Seattle	OT
Seattle wins series 4–1

=== Conference finals ===
Eastern Conference

Red Deer vs. Brandon
Date	Away	Home
April 18	Brandon 1	5 Red Deer
April 19	Brandon 0	2 Red Deer
April 22	Red Deer 5	1 Brandon
April 23	Red Deer 1	2 Brandon
April 25	Brandon 1	3 Red Deer
Red Deer wins series 4–1

Western Conference

Kelowna vs. Seattle
Date	Away	Home	
April 18	Seattle 4	5 Kelowna	
April 19	Seattle 3	6 Kelowna	
April 22	Kelowna 2	3 Seattle	2OT
April 23	Kelowna 4	0 Seattle	
April 25	Seattle 2	4 Kelowna	
Kelowna wins series 4–1

=== WHL Championship ===
Kelowna vs. Red Deer
Date	Away	Home
May 2	Red Deer 1	5 Kelowna
May 3	Red Deer 2	5 Kelowna
May 5	Kelowna 2	6 Red Deer
May 6	Kelowna 1	2 Red Deer
May 8	Red Deer 2	5 Kelowna
May 10	Kelowna 2	0 Red Deer
Kelowna wins series 4–2

== All-Star game ==
All-Star festivities included a round robin between all-star squads from the three CHL leagues. On November 12, the WHL Eastern All-Stars defeated the QMJHL Lebel All-Stars 5–2 at Hull, Quebec before a crowd of 2,194. Then, on November 19, the WHL Western All-Stars defeated the OHL Eastern All-Stars 7–3 at Vancouver, British Columbia before a crowd of 7,046. With the victories, the WHL won the Hershey Cup as champion of the round robin format all-star tournament.

== WHL awards ==
Four Broncos Memorial Trophy (Player of the Year): Josh Harding, Regina Pats
Daryl K. (Doc) Seaman Trophy (Scholastic Player of the Year): Brett Dickie, Brandon Wheat Kings
Scholastic Team of the Year: Prince Albert Raiders
Bob Clarke Trophy (Top scorer): Erik Christensen, Kamloops Blazers
Brad Hornung Trophy (Most Sportsmanlike Player): Boyd Gordon, Red Deer Rebels
Bill Hunter Trophy (Top Defenseman): Jeff Woywitka, Red Deer Rebels
Jim Piggott Memorial Trophy (Rookie of the Year): Matt Ellison, Red Deer Rebels
Del Wilson Trophy (Top Goaltender): Josh Harding, Regina Pats
Dunc McCallum Memorial Trophy (Coach of the Year): Marc Habscheid, Kelowna Rockets
Lloyd Saunders Memorial Trophy (Executive of the Year): Bruce Hamilton, Kelowna Rockets
Scotty Munro Memorial Trophy (Best regular season record): Kelowna Rockets
Allen Paradice Memorial Trophy (Top Official): Steve Kozari
St. Clair Group Trophy (Marketing/Public Relations Award): Anne-Marie Hamilton, Kelowna Rockets, and Reid Pederson, Regina Pats
Doug Wickenheiser Memorial Trophy (Humanitarian of the Year): Ryan Craig, Brandon Wheat Kings
WHL Plus-Minus Award: Matthew Spiller, Seattle Thunderbirds
WHL Playoff Most Valuable Player: Jesse Schultz, Kelowna Rockets

== All-Star teams ==
Eastern Conference
	First Team		Second Team	
Goal	Josh Harding	Regina Pats	Cam Ward	Red Deer Rebels
Defense	Jeff Woywitka	Red Deer Rebels	Stephen Mann	Saskatoon Blades
Defense	Ian White	Swift Current Broncos	Nathan Paetsch	Moose Jaw Warriors
Forward	Ryan Craig	Brandon Wheat Kings	Jeremy Jackson	Lethbridge Hurricanes
Forward	Jordin Tootoo	Brandon Wheat Kings	David Bararuk	Moose Jaw Warriors
Forward	Boyd Gordon	Red Deer Rebels	Matt Ellison	Red Deer Rebels
Western Conference
	First Team		Second Team	
Goal	Kelly Guard	Kelowna Rockets	Billy Thompson	Prince George Cougars
Defense	Tomas Slovak	Kelowna Rockets	Gerard Dicaire	Kootenay Ice
Defense	Tomas Mojzis	Seattle Thunderbirds	Josh Gorges	Kelowna Rockets
Forward	Erik Christensen	Kamloops Blazers	Nigel Dawes	Kootenay Ice
Forward	Jesse Schultz	Kelowna Rockets	Kiel McLeod	Kelowna Rockets
Forward	Brooks Laich	Seattle Thunderbirds	Adam Courchaine	Vancouver Giants

- source: Western Hockey League press release

== 2003 Bantam draft ==
List of first round picks in the bantam draft.

#	Player	Nationality	WHL Team
1	Jonathan Toews (C)	Canada	Tri-City Americans
2	Ben Maxwell (C)	Canada	Kootenay Ice (via Lethbridge)
3	Zach Hamill (C)	Canada	Everett Silvertips
4	Ryan de Pape (RW)	Canada	Prince Albert Raiders
5	Sasha Golin (RW)	Canada	Portland Winter Hawks
6	Tyler Swystun (C)	Canada	Prince George Cougars
7	Jason Reese (LW)	United States	Vancouver Giants
8	Michael Reich (C)	Canada	Spokane Chiefs
9	Keegan Dansereau (RW)	Canada	Calgary Hitmen
10	Trevor Glass (D)	Canada	Medicine Hat Tigers
11	Logan Pyett (D)	Canada	Regina Pats
12	Todd Panchyson (D)	Canada	Kootenay Ice
13	Victor Bartley (D)	Canada	Kamloops Blazers
14	Justin McCrae (C)	Canada	Saskatoon Blades
15	Brennan Wray (C)	Canada	Moose Jaw Warriors
16	Kyle Bortis (LW)	Canada	Swift Current Broncos
17	George Holloway (C)	Canada	Seattle Thunderbirds
18	Mike Cann (D)	Canada	Brandon Wheat Kings
19	Matthew Cline (C)	Canada	Red Deer Rebels
20	Craig Cuthbert (C)	Canada	Kelowna Rockets

== See also ==
- 2003 NHL entry draft
- 2002 in sports
- 2003 in sports

Preceded by 2001–02 WHL season	WHL seasons	Succeeded by 2003–04 WHL season
