= Brooks Laich =

Canadian ice hockey player (born 1983)

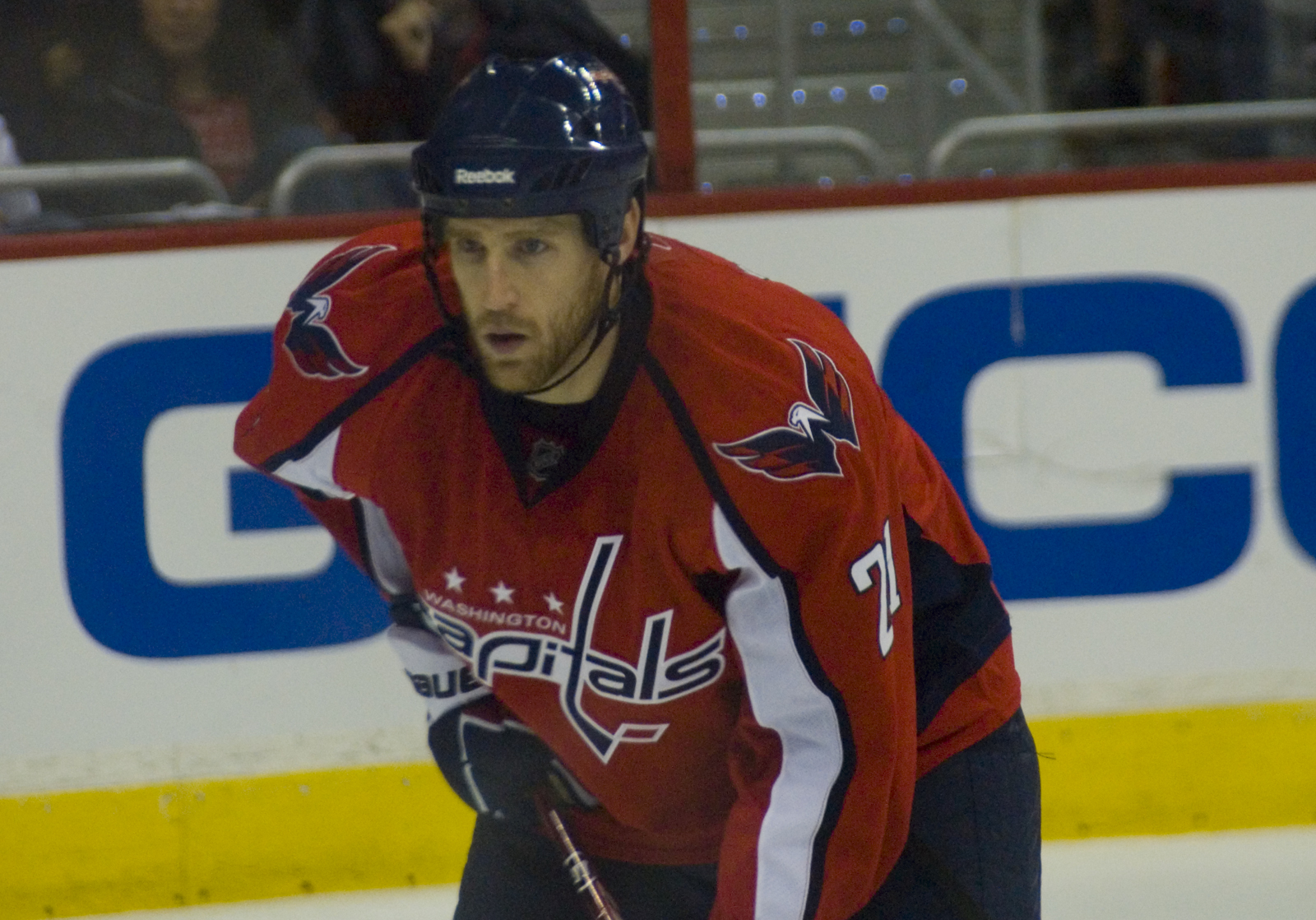
- Laich in 2011
- Born: June 23, 1983 (age 43) Wawota, Saskatchewan, Canada
- Height: 6 ft 2 in (188 cm)
- Weight: 199 lb (90 kg; 14 st 3 lb)
- Position: Centre
- Shot: Left
- Played for: Ottawa Senators; Washington Capitals; Kloten Flyers; Toronto Maple Leafs; Los Angeles Kings
- National team: Canada
- NHL draft: 193rd overall, 2001; Ottawa Senators
- Playing career: 2004–2018

Evan Brooks Laich (/ˈlaɪk/; born June 23, 1983) is a Canadian former professional ice hockey player. A forward, he played over 750 National Hockey League (NHL) games across four teams: the Ottawa Senators, Washington Capitals, Toronto Maple Leafs and the Los Angeles Kings.

Laich was originally drafted by the Senators in the 2001 NHL entry draft, and was later traded to the Capitals as part of the package for Peter Bondra. Before playing professionally, Laich spent time in the Western Hockey League (WHL) playing with the Moose Jaw Warriors and Seattle Thunderbirds. He has represented Canada internationally, capturing a silver medal at the 2003 World Junior Championships, and playing for Canada again at the 2010 World Hockey Championships.

== Playing career ==
=== Minor ===
Laich started playing minor hockey in his hometown of Wawota, Saskatchewan. During the 1999–2000 season, he was the top scorer and most valuable player for the midget AAA Tisdale Trojans. He was the runner up for league MVP.

=== Junior ===
Laich started his junior hockey career with the Moose Jaw Warriors of the Western Hockey League (WHL) during the 2000–01 season. He played in 71 games with the Warriors, scoring nine goals and adding 21 assists. Laich was a dedicated student in Moose Jaw, being awarded the club's Scholastic Player of the Year for the 2000–01 season. After the season, he was drafted by the Ottawa Senators in the sixth round, 193rd overall, of the 2001 NHL entry draft. He started the 2001–02 season with the Warriors, but was traded to the Seattle Thunderbirds along with Tomáš Mojžíš for Craig Olynick and Stas Avksentiev. The deal was unpopular with Warriors fans, as Olynick left the club and Avksentiev never reported.

Laich spent the rest of his junior career with the Thunderbirds. He started to develop more of an offensive game, finishing off the 2001–02 season with 58 points in the 47 games he played in Seattle. Laich has said that getting traded to Seattle was a good move for him, with coach Dean Chynoweth providing ample opportunities for him to display his skills. He was named the team's Most Dedicated Player after the 2001–02 season. His offensive game flourished further in his first full season with the Thunderbirds (2002–03), as he finished the season with 41 goals and 53 assists, leading the team. These stats placed him sixth overall in the WHL points race. He was named the WHL's Western Conference MVP. He was also named to the WHL's Western Conference First All-Star Team, and the Canadian Hockey League's Third All-Star Team.

=== Professional ===
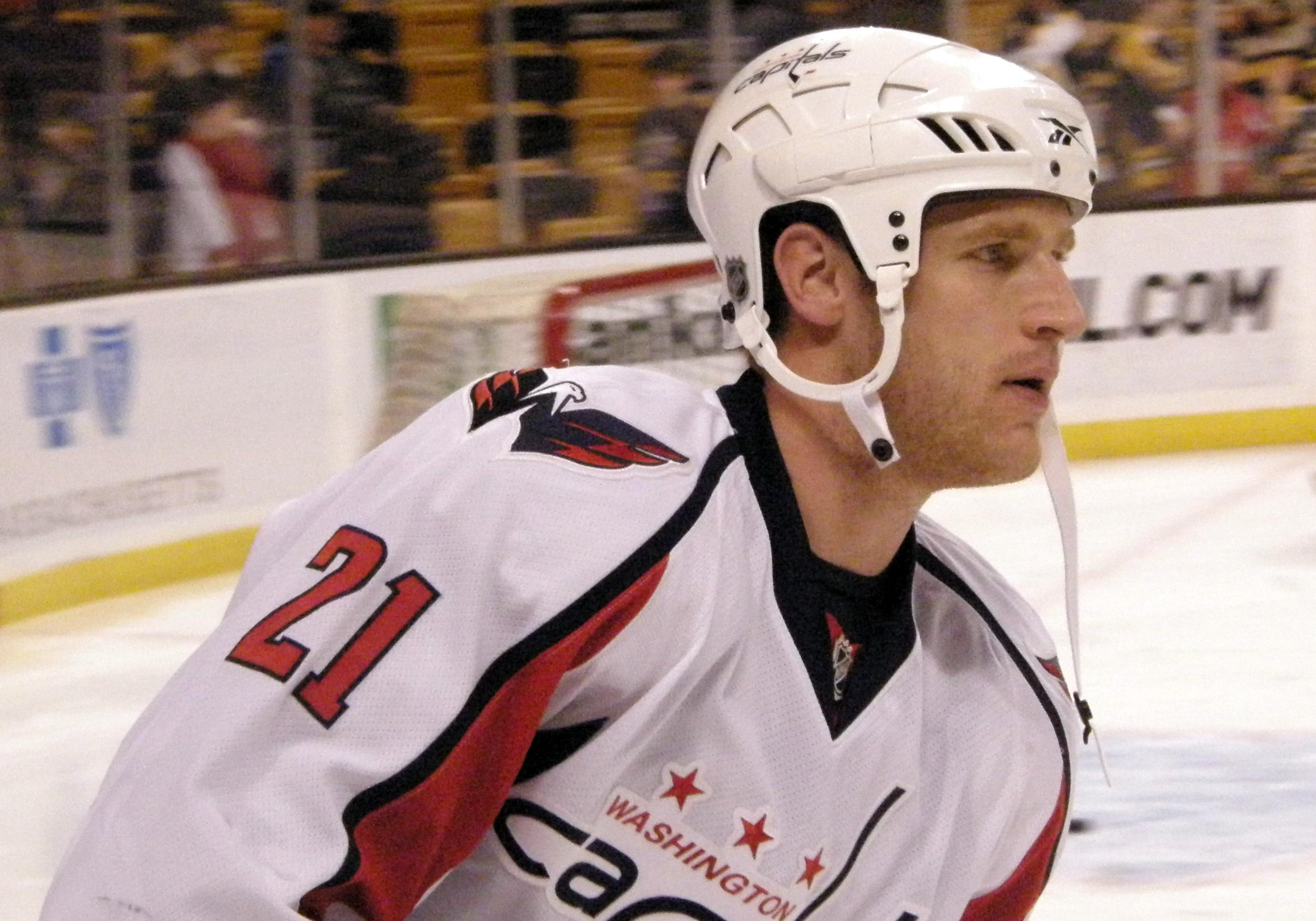
Laich with Washington in 2009

Laich attended the Ottawa Senators training camp before the 2002–03 season. He played his first professional game in the American Hockey League (AHL) for the Binghamton Senators in 2003. He made his National Hockey League (NHL) debut with the Senators on February 3, 2004, against the New Jersey Devils. Later in the season, Laich was traded to the Washington Capitals, along with a second round draft pick, for Peter Bondra, a deal which ended Bondra's 14-year career with the Capitals. After the trade, he reported to the Capitals' AHL affiliate, the Portland Pirates, making his debut with the Capitals on March 12, 2003, against the Chicago Blackhawks. He finished the season playing with the Pirates, appearing in six playoff games. The NHL lockout saw Laich spend the entire 2004–05 season with the Pirates, playing in 68 games, finishing eighth on the team in scoring with 16 goals and 10 assists.

During the 2005–06 season, Laich played in 104 regular season and playoff games between the Capitals and their new AHL affiliate, the Hershey Bears; this tied him for the most games played in the organization with Boyd Gordon. After training camp, he started the season in the AHL, but was optimistic about his chances to play in the NHL, saying, "You've just got to work hard. There's spots up there, guys could go down with an injury, you want to be the first guy called up." He spent most of the season at the NHL level, playing in 73 games and recording 21 points. After the Capitals' season was over, Laich rejoined the Bears for their playoff run and scored eight goals in 21 games while helping the team capture the Calder Cup. Laich played the entire 2006–07 season with the Capitals, scoring eight goals and adding ten assists. After the season, Laich and the Capitals went to salary arbitration, where he was awarded a one-year contract worth $725,000.

Laich played in all 82 games for the Capitals during the 2007–08 season, and set career highs in goals, assists and points. His 21 goals ranked third overall on the team. He led the Capitals with two short handed goals, and played in his 200th career regular season game. After a two-goal game against the Atlanta Thrashers, Laich summed up his philosophy towards scoring: "If you want money, go to the bank. If you want bread, go to the bakery. If you want goals, go to the net." During the playoffs, Laich had a five-game point streak in the Eastern Conference quarter-finals against the Philadelphia Flyers. This tied him for the longest point streak during the first round of the playoffs. As a restricted free agent after the season, Laich signed a three-year deal with the team on July 9, 2008.

The 2008–09 season saw Laich play in all 82 games for the Capitals again, where he set new career highs in goals, assists and points; he scored 23 goals and added 30 assists, breaking the 50-point plateau for the first time in his career. During the Capitals' playoff run, Laich played in 14 games and added seven points. He assisted on the overtime winning goal in Game 6 of the Eastern Conference Semi-Final against the eventual Stanley Cup champions Pittsburgh Penguins.

Laich's streak of consecutive games played was broken in the 2009–10 season, when he missed four games with a cheekbone injury in February 2010. He still managed to set new career highs in both goals (25) and assists (34). On February 10, shortly after returning from injury, Laich recorded his first career NHL hat trick, against the Montreal Canadiens. During the playoffs, Laich scored the last goal of the Capitals season during Game 7 against the Montreal Canadiens.

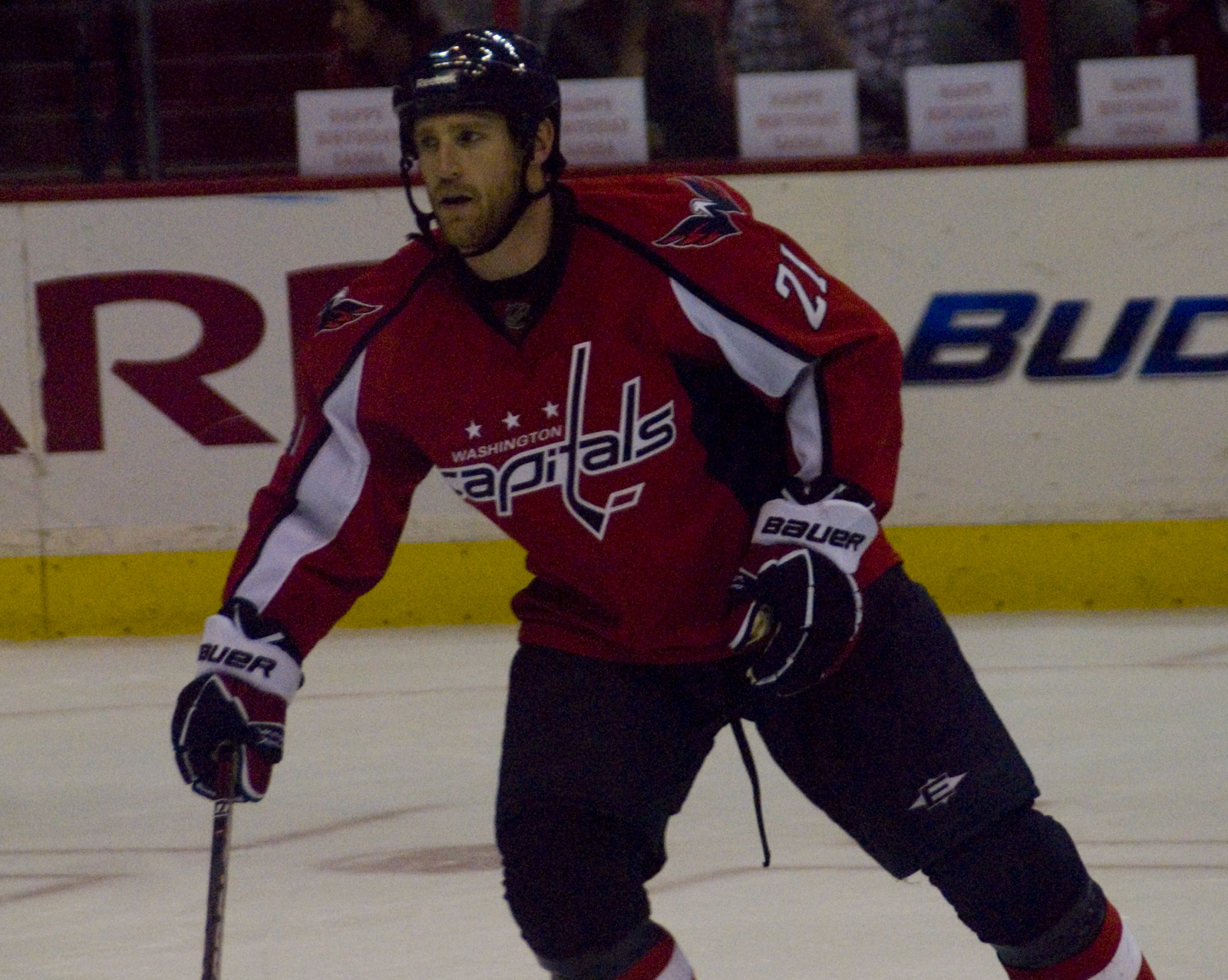
Laich in 2013

During the 2010–11 season, the Capitals participated in the 2011 NHL Winter Classic against the Pittsburgh Penguins at Heinz Field, Pittsburgh. Leading up to the game, both teams were featured on HBO's 24/7, which offered a behind-the-scenes look at both teams as they prepared. Laich refused to blame the presence of the cameras for the team's losing streak, saying, "There's no using the HBO cameras as a crutch or an annoyance or anything like that. There's no excuse. I don't think HBO has played any bit of an ounce in how things have gone the last two weeks." Laich was appreciative of the opportunities afforded by the outdoor game, and was happy to be able to share time with his family and friends on the outdoor rink set up at Heinz Field.

On June 28, 2011, Laich signed a six-year, $27 million contract extension worth $4.5 million per season.

As the player representative for the Washington Capitals during the 2012 NHL-NHLPA CBA negotiations, Laich stated in support of the National Hockey League Players' Association (NHLPA) that, "At some point you have to dig your heels in and fight. If we don't this time, then what happens next? Appeasement only makes the aggressor more aggressive, and the players really understand that. We believe in our cause and our leadership and I believe we're more unified this time and ready for a fight."

Prior to the start of the lockout-shortened 2012-2013 playing season, Laich played for the Kloten Flyers of Switzerland's National League. In 35 games for the Flyers, Laich posted 17 goals and a total of 38 points. He also reportedly suffered a groin injury, which limited his play upon his return stateside with the NHL. When play resumed for the 2012–13 season, Laich was limited to nine games.

On March 17, 2014, the Capitals announced via Twitter that Laich "underwent a successful procedure to release a tight adductor," a part of the groin muscle. He is expected to miss the rest of the season with a recovery time of four-to-six weeks.

Except for a minor shoulder injury resulting in him missing 16 games, Laich returned to full health in 2014-15. He finished with seven goals and 20 points in 66 games played.

In the 2015–16 season, Laich's offensive production rapidly declined, while his $4.5 million cap hit stuck out as one of the only adverse aspects of a league-leading Capitals squad. On February 27, 2016, the Capitals placed Laich on waivers for the purpose of sending him to the Hershey Bears of the AHL. The following day, on the eve of the trade deadline, Laich, along with Connor Carrick and a second round selection (Carl Grundström) in the 2016 draft, were traded to the Toronto Maple Leafs, his boyhood team, in exchange for Daniel Winnik and a fifth round pick (Beck Malenstyn) in the 2016 draft. The purpose of the trade was to give the Capitals salary cap relief to use toward younger core player contracts that needed re-signing the following off-season. Capitals GM Brian Maclellan called the trade, when asked, the hardest thing he had done as General Manager of the team. Laich had been the longest tenured active professional Washington-area athlete at the time of the trade, concluding his career of 12 years with the franchise. In what easily stands as the most emotional trade in Capitals history since Laich was dealt to Washington in a package for Peter Bondra, one journalist wrote "It's ironic that money is what ultimately forced the Caps to move Laich. This is a guy who loves the game so much, he'd probably play for free."

Laich returned to Washington a few days later where the Capitals honored the centreman with a video tribute during the first period and a long standing ovation from the hometown fans and his former teammates. The Maple Leafs would lose the game 3-2. Finishing out the season in Toronto, Laich's offensive statistics improved significantly, recording identical numbers to what he scored in Washington while playing in a third of the games.

As a free agent from the Maple Leafs, Laich was unsigned over the summer. He later accepted a try-out contract to attend the Los Angeles Kings' training camp. Despite suffering an early injury, Laich returned to impress in the preseason, however was ultimately released prior to the 2017–18 season. With the Kings suffering from injury through the early stages of the campaign, he returned to the fold in signing a one-year, $650,000 deal on October 19, 2017. On November 25, Laich was placed on waivers by the Kings, and was later assigned to their AHL affiliate, the Ontario Reign. Having recorded 1 assist in 12 games with the Kings and before reporting to the Reign, Laich was placed on unconditional waivers, opting for a mutual termination of his contract on November 27, 2017. On June 25, 2021, Laich formally announced his retirement.

== International play ==
Medal record

Representing Canada

Men's ice hockey

World Junior Championships
Silver medal – second place	2003 Halifax	

Laich debuted with Team Canada at the 2003 World Junior Championships, which were held in Halifax, Nova Scotia. In a game against Sweden, Laich scored Canada's first goal of the tournament. He scored two goals and added four assists in six games at the tournament, where Canada won a silver medal. According to his father, Harold, his son had always dreamed of playing for Canada. Laich's next experience with Team Canada came at the 2010 World Championships. He scored one goal in seven games as Canada finished seventh. During the tournament in a game against Russia, Laich raised the ire of his Capitals' teammate Semyon Varlamov for slashing and cross-checking Alexander Ovechkin. Varlamov said of Laich's play, "...Brooks Laich was constantly trying to slash and cross-check him (Ovechkin) as painful [sic] as possible. After the game, he certainly wished me luck and victory at the world championship, but the unpleasant impression still remains."

== Playing style ==
In 2009, Capitals' Head Coach Bruce Boudreau believed that Laich had not yet reached his full potential, saying, "...I still don't think we've seen the best of Brooks. I think he's going to be a 25-, 30-goal scorer in this league and become a staple for a while." Boudreau also said Laich is considered one of the hardest working players on the Capitals' roster by his coaches and teammates. Part of Laich's inspiration comes from his father, who, during a 34-year tenure as a high school principal, only missed three days of work. With the Capitals, Laich played on the power play and killed penalties in addition to his ice time at even strength. Laich has been lauded for his leadership and was considered for a more formal role in the team's leadership structure in 2009.

Laich is a hard worker, and dedicated to his team, saying, "If I asked you about your family, you would talk about them forever because it's something you love. That's the way I feel about this team. This team is my life, and I love playing here and I'm passionate about playing hockey. So it's easy for me to talk about it." Boudreau has said, "You are never going to find a guy that cares more than Brooks Laich." Laich spends time in the off-season with a power skating instructor, which he feels is key to a long career.

== Personal life ==
Laich has two siblings, an older sister and younger brother. His father worked as a high school teacher and principal. In his free time, he plays guitar and golf. Colorado Avalanche star Joe Sakic was Laich's favorite player growing up. His favourite team was the Toronto Maple Leafs, whom he used to dream of captaining. He is actively involved in charity work, supporting charities related to multiple sclerosis and Athletes Against Autism. While still playing junior hockey, Laich helped his hometown of Wawota raise money to purchase a Zamboni for the local arena.

Laich received national media attention when he stopped to help two stranded Capitals fans change their flat tire after a Game 7 loss in the 2010 playoffs against the Montreal Canadiens. When he came across the woman and her teenaged daughter stranded on the Theodore Roosevelt Bridge, Laich stopped to install their spare and apologized for the club's early loss in the playoffs. For his efforts, Laich was hockey analyst Michael Farber's nominee for the 2010 Sports Illustrated Sportsman of the Year. When asked about the incident, Laich responded, "It's not a big deal. It was just a tire. The lady was stranded on the side of the road, I saw that it was just a lady and her daughter, and I figured my tire expertise outweighed hers."

In February 2014, it was revealed that Laich started dating professional dancer and actress Julianne Hough. On August 18, 2015, Laich officially announced via Instagram that he and Hough were engaged. The couple were married on July 8, 2017. They resided in Los Angeles, California with their husky named Koda. They announced their split on May 29, 2020, but reconciled by early September. Hough filed for divorce on November 2, 2020 and it was finalized in 2022.

After his split from Hough, Laich announced his relationship with two-time CrossFit Games champion Katrín Davíðsdóttir on Instagram in August 2021. They announced their engagement in December 2024. They welcomed daughter Emberly Heba Laich in October 2025.

== Career statistics ==
=== Regular season and playoffs ===
			Regular season					Playoffs
Season	Team	League	GP	G	A	Pts	PIM	GP	G	A	Pts	PIM
1999–2000	Tisdale Trojans AAA	SMHL	43	39	34	73	31	4	1	5	6	0
2000–01	Moose Jaw Warriors	WHL	71	9	21	30	28	4	0	0	0	5
2001–02	Moose Jaw Warriors	WHL	28	6	14	20	12	—	—	—	—	—
2001–02	Seattle Thunderbirds	WHL	47	22	36	58	42	11	5	3	8	11
2002–03	Seattle Thunderbirds	WHL	60	41	53	94	65	15	5	14	19	24
2003–04	Binghamton Senators	AHL	44	15	18	33	16	—	—	—	—	—
2003–04	Ottawa Senators	NHL	1	0	0	0	2	—	—	—	—	—
2003–04	Portland Pirates	AHL	22	1	3	4	12	6	0	0	0	0
2003–04	Washington Capitals	NHL	4	0	1	1	0	—	—	—	—	—
2004–05	Portland Pirates	AHL	68	16	10	26	33	—	—	—	—	—
2005–06	Washington Capitals	NHL	73	7	14	21	26	—	—	—	—	—
2005–06	Hershey Bears	AHL	10	7	6	13	8	21	8	7	15	29
2006–07	Washington Capitals	NHL	73	8	10	18	29	—	—	—	—	—
2007–08	Washington Capitals	NHL	82	21	16	37	35	7	1	5	6	4
2008–09	Washington Capitals	NHL	82	23	30	53	31	14	3	4	7	10
2009–10	Washington Capitals	NHL	78	25	34	59	34	7	2	1	3	4
2010–11	Washington Capitals	NHL	82	16	32	48	46	9	1	6	7	2
2011–12	Washington Capitals	NHL	82	16	25	41	34	14	2	5	7	6
2012–13	Kloten Flyers	NLA	19	6	12	18	28	—	—	—	—	—
2012–13	Washington Capitals	NHL	9	1	3	4	6	—	—	—	—	—
2013–14	Washington Capitals	NHL	51	8	7	15	16	—	—	—	—	—
2014–15	Washington Capitals	NHL	66	7	13	20	24	14	1	1	2	0
2015–16	Washington Capitals	NHL	60	1	6	7	16	—	—	—	—	—
2015–16	Toronto Maple Leafs	NHL	21	1	6	7	2	—	—	—	—	—
2016–17	Toronto Marlies	AHL	27	1	8	9	12	—	—	—	—	—
2017–18	Los Angeles Kings	NHL	12	0	1	1	6	—	—	—	—	—
NHL totals			776	134	198	332	307	65	10	22	32	26

Statistics source

=== International ===
Year	Team	Event	Result	GP	G	A	Pts	PIM
2003	Canada	WJC	2nd place, silver medalist(s)	6	2	4	6	0
2010	Canada	WC	7th	7	1	0	1	0
Junior totals				6	2	4	6	0
Senior totals				7	1	0	1	0

Statistics source

== Awards and honors ==
Award	Year
WHL
West First All-Star Team	2003
AHL
Calder Cup Champion	2006
