= Charles Boyd =

Charles Boyd may refer to:

- Charles Twining Boyd (1842–1914), archdeacon of the Anglican Diocese of Colombo
- Charles Anthony Boyd (1959–1999), American serial killer
- Charles G. Boyd (1938–2022), United States Air Force general
- Charles T. Boyd (1870–1916), United States Army officer

== See also ==
- Charles Boyd Homestead Group, pioneer ranch complex in Deschutes County, Oregon
