= Boyd Lake =

Boyd Lake may refer to:

- Boyd Lake (Colorado), United States
- Boyd Lake (Northwest Territories), Canada
- Boyd Lake (Nova Scotia), Canada
- Boyd Lake (Quebec), Canada
- Boyd Lagoon, Western Australia, Australia
