= Boyds =

Boyds may refer to:

== Places ==
=== United States ===
- Boyds, Maryland
  - Boyds station, a rail station
- Boyds, Ohio
- Boyds, Washington
- Boyds Creek, Tennessee
- Boyds Corner Reservoir, Putnam County, New York

=== Elsewhere ===
- Boyds, Saint Kitts and Nevis
- Boyds Beach, Wales

== Other ==
- Boyds Bears, collectibles

== See also ==
- Boyd (disambiguation)
