= Byron and Ivan Boyd House =

Historic house in Iowa, United States

- U.S. National Register of Historic Places
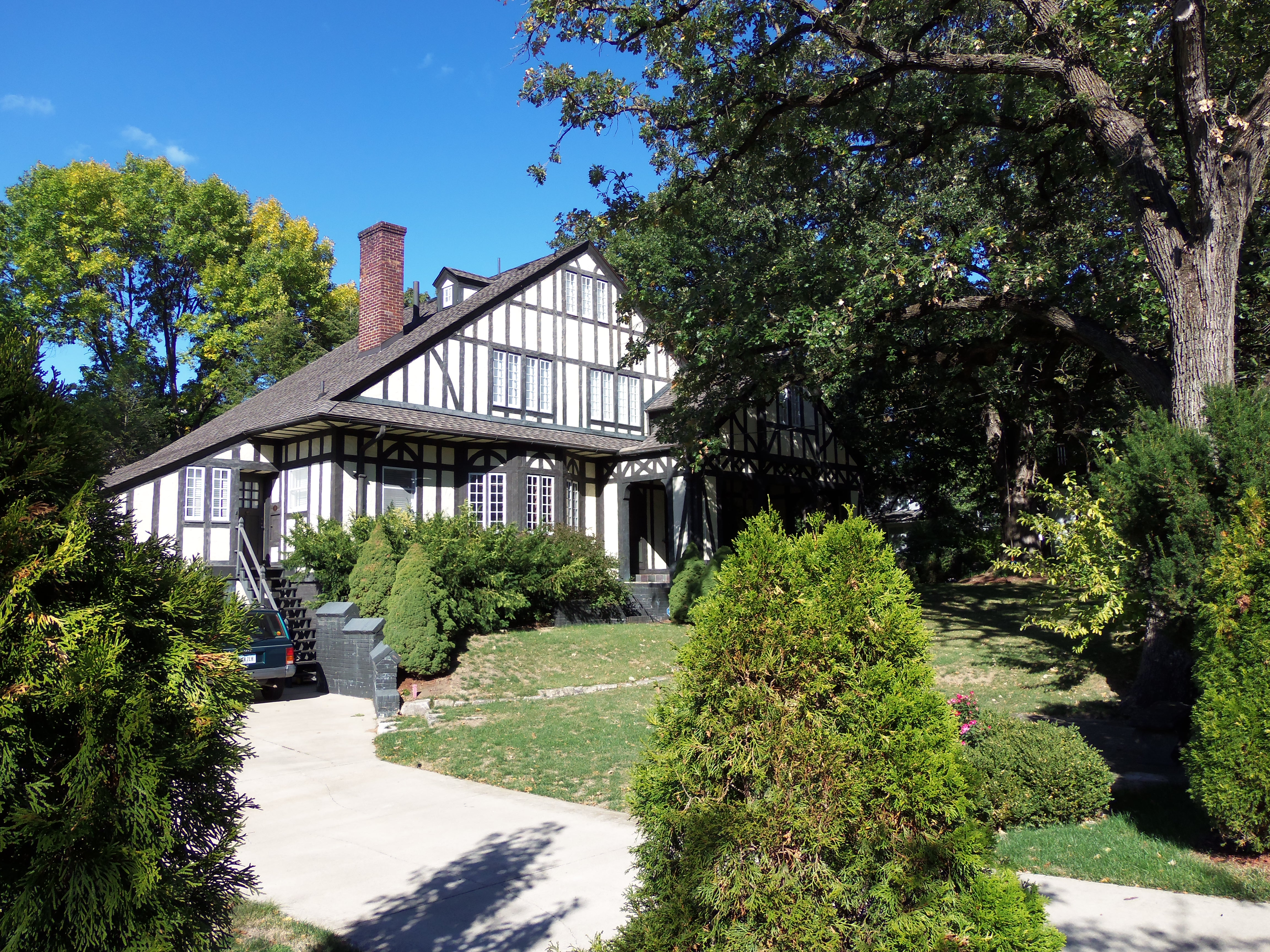

- Location within Iowa Location within the United States
- Location: 304 42nd St. Des Moines, Iowa
- Coordinates: 41°34′51.9″N 93°40′28.5″W
- Area: less than one acre
- Built: 1924
- Architect: Byron Bennett Boyd
- Architectural style: Tudor Revival
- NRHP reference No.: 04000263
- Added to NRHP: April 6, 2004

The Byron and Ivan Boyd House, also known as Boyd Cottage, is a historic building located in Des Moines, Iowa, United States. Built in 1924, the 2½-story Tudor Revival half-timbered cottage is located in an up-scale neighborhood. The neighborhood is composed of large private residential lots with numerous mansions built in the first half of the 20th century for the city's prominent citizens. Its significance is its association with Byron Bennett Boyd. He was a local architect, and a nationally recognized artist and painter. Boyd was the architect that designed this house, and lived here from 1924 to 1945. He began practicing architecture at the prominent Des Moines firm of Proudfoot, Bird and Rawson before setting up his own practice in 1916 with Herbert Moore. His work includes Salisbury House (1923), Fred W. Hubbell mansion, known as Helfred Farms (1928), and the Ralph Rollins House (1926). Boyd's wife, Ivan Bloom Hardin, owned her own publishing company.

In his art career, Boyd was a contributor at the Stone City Art Colony, and was friends with Grant Wood and Thomas Hart Benton. He exhibited paintings at the Whitney Museum and the Metropolitan Museum of Art in New York City, the Corcoran Gallery of Art in Washington, D.C., the Pennsylvania Academy of Fine Arts in Philadelphia, the Art Institute of Chicago, and others.

The house was listed on the National Register of Historic Places in 2004. It shares the historic designation with the limestone wall that extends around the perimeter of the grounds (contributing structure) and the stone patio and bench (contributing object).
