= Erik Christensen =

Canadian ice hockey player (born 1983)

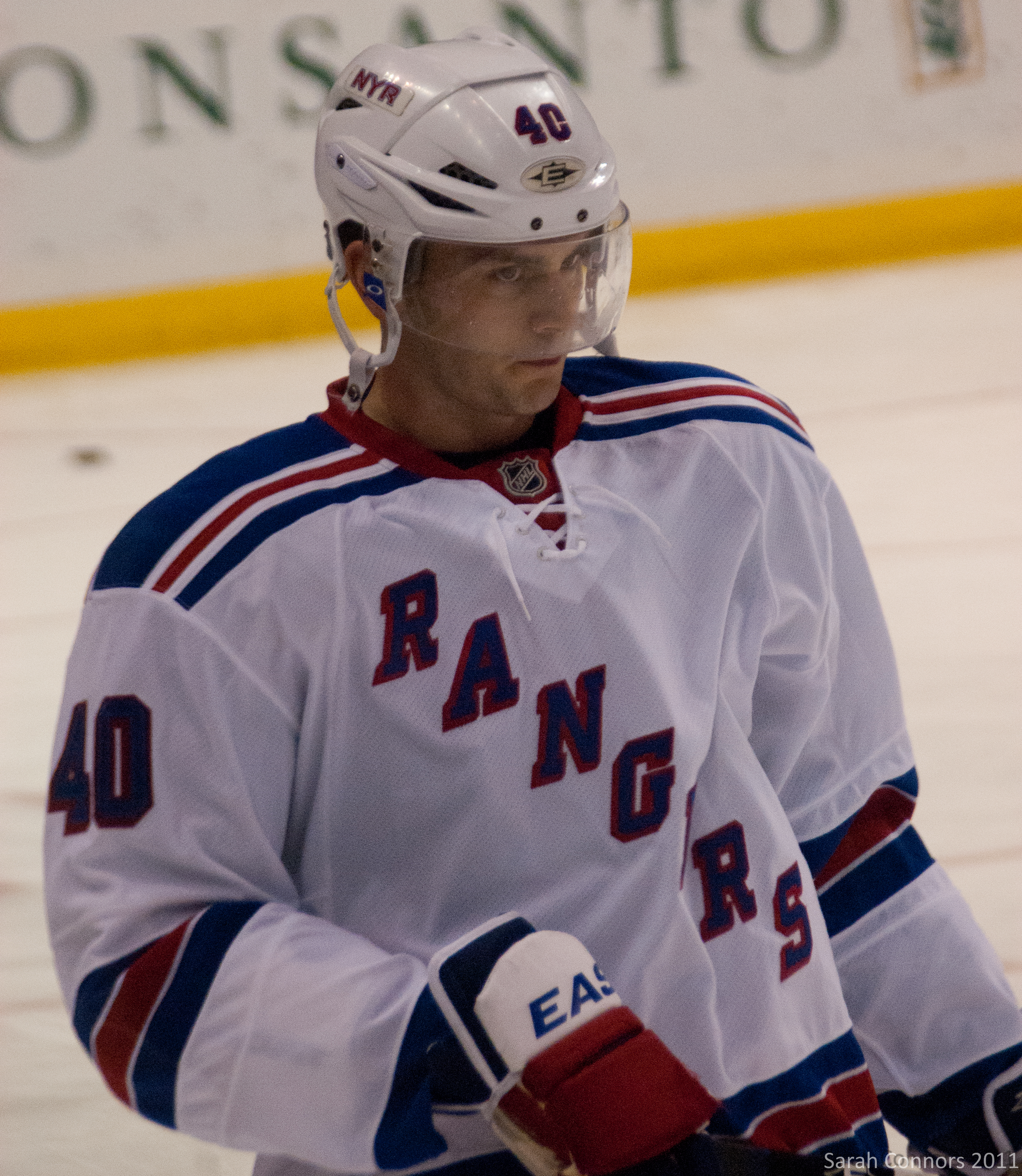
- Christensen with the New York Rangers in 2011
- Born: December 17, 1983 (age 42) Edmonton, Alberta, Canada
- Height: 6 ft 1 in (185 cm)
- Weight: 203 lb (92 kg; 14 st 7 lb)
- Position: Centre
- Shot: Left
- Played for: Pittsburgh Penguins; Atlanta Thrashers; Anaheim Ducks; New York Rangers; Minnesota Wild; HC Lev Praha; HV71
- NHL draft: 69th overall, 2002; Pittsburgh Penguins
- Playing career: 2004–2017

Erik Christensen (born December 17, 1983) is a Canadian former professional ice hockey centre who last played for HV71 of the Swedish Hockey League (SHL).

== Playing career ==
Christensen was drafted by the Pittsburgh Penguins in the third round (69th overall) of the 2002 NHL entry draft. In the 2002–03 season, Christensen received the Bob Clarke Trophy for being the leading scorer of the Western Hockey League (WHL). He tallied 108 points (54 goals) in 67 games with the Kamloops Blazers.

The 2004–05 NHL lockout left the Wilkes-Barre/Scranton Penguins of the American Hockey League (AHL) stacked with talent, but Christensen impressed Penguins management by scoring 27 points (14 goals) in his first pro season. In the 2005–06 season, he jumped out of the gate quickly, tallying 19 points (9 goals) in only 9 games. The Pittsburgh Penguins called him up on October 31, 2005.

Christensen scored his first NHL goal on November 3, 2005, against the New York Islanders (against goaltender Rick DiPietro) at 15:43 into the 2nd period. Another promising rookie for the Penguins in 2005–06 (along with Sidney Crosby, Colby Armstrong, Ryan Whitney and others), Christensen earned 13 points (6 goals) in 33 games with the Penguins during his rookie campaign.

On February 26, 2008, the Atlanta Thrashers acquired Christensen along with Colby Armstrong, Angelo Esposito, and a first-round draft pick in a trade deadline deal that sent Marián Hossa and Pascal Dupuis to the Penguins.

On March 4, 2009, the Thrashers sent Christensen to the Anaheim Ducks in exchange for Eric O'Dell. He contributed 2 goals and 7 assists to the Ducks during the remainder of the season, and contributed 2 assists during the 2009 Stanley Cup Playoffs.

Christensen was claimed off waivers by the New York Rangers on December 2, 2009.

During a game against the New Jersey Devils on December 27, 2010, Christensen sustained an injury to his right knee ligament requiring him to miss four to six weeks.

On February 3, 2012, Christensen was traded by the Rangers, along with a conditional 7th round draft pick in 2013, to the Minnesota Wild for center Casey Wellman. The Wild received the conditional pick after Christensen was not re-signed by the team following the 2011–2012 season.

On June 5, 2012, Christensen signed a two-year agreement with Czech-based HC Lev Praha, of the Kontinental Hockey League. In the midst of his final year under contract with Lev, Christensen secured a mid-season transfer to the Swedish Hockey League, with HV71, on October 22, 2013. In his fourth and final season with HV71 in the 2016–17 season, Christensen contributed with 21 points in 45 games and notched a further 5 points in 16 post-season games to help HV71 capture their 5th Le Mat Trophy. A week after claiming the Championship, Christensen was not tendered a new contract with HV71 and became a free agent. He opted to end his 13-year professional career and return home to Edmonton.

Christensen was an extremely valuable shootout specialist over his NHL career. He finished with 29 shootout goals on 55 attempts for a 52.7% shooting percentage. As of April 2026, he is 29th all-time in the NHL in shootout goals but 2nd all-time in shootout shooting percentage amongst skaters with 50 or more shootout shots, behind only Artemi Panarin.

== Personal life ==
Christensen's nickname has been "Crusher" since he was 14 years old.

== Career statistics ==
			Regular season					Playoffs
Season	Team	League	GP	G	A	Pts	PIM	GP	G	A	Pts	PIM
1999–2000	Kamloops Blazers	WHL	66	9	5	14	41	4	0	0	0	2
2000–01	Kamloops Blazers	WHL	72	21	23	44	36	4	1	1	2	0
2001–02	Kamloops Blazers	WHL	70	22	36	58	68	4	0	0	0	4
2002–03	Kamloops Blazers	WHL	67	54	54	108	60	6	1	7	8	14
2003–04	Kamloops Blazers	WHL	29	10	14	24	40	—	—	—	—	—
2003–04	Brandon Wheat Kings	WHL	34	17	21	38	20	11	8	4	12	8
2004–05	Wilkes–Barre/Scranton Penguins	AHL	77	14	13	27	33	11	1	6	7	4
2005–06	Wilkes–Barre/Scranton Penguins	AHL	48	24	22	46	50	11	2	2	4	2
2005–06	Pittsburgh Penguins	NHL	33	6	7	13	34	—	—	—	—	—
2006–07	Wilkes–Barre/Scranton Penguins	AHL	16	12	12	24	8	—	—	—	—	—
2006–07	Pittsburgh Penguins	NHL	61	18	15	33	26	4	0	0	0	6
2007–08	Pittsburgh Penguins	NHL	49	9	11	20	28	—	—	—	—	—
2007–08	Atlanta Thrashers	NHL	10	2	2	4	2	—	—	—	—	—
2008–09	Atlanta Thrashers	NHL	47	5	14	19	14	—	—	—	—	—
2008–09	Anaheim Ducks	NHL	17	2	7	9	6	8	0	2	2	0
2009–10	Anaheim Ducks	NHL	9	0	0	0	2	—	—	—	—	—
2009–10	New York Rangers	NHL	49	8	18	26	24	—	—	—	—	—
2010–11	New York Rangers	NHL	63	11	16	27	18	5	1	0	1	2
2011–12	New York Rangers	NHL	20	1	4	5	2	—	—	—	—	—
2011–12	Connecticut Whale	AHL	5	2	1	3	8	—	—	—	—	—
2011–12	Minnesota Wild	NHL	29	6	1	7	6	—	—	—	—	—
2012–13	Lev Praha	KHL	41	11	10	21	18	—	—	—	—	—
2013–14	Lev Praha	KHL	12	1	1	2	6	—	—	—	—	—
2013–14	HV71	SHL	38	13	14	27	22	8	4	1	5	4
2014–15	HV71	SHL	46	13	31	44	14	6	5	0	5	6
2015–16	HV71	SHL	42	9	15	24	28	1	0	1	1	0
2016–17	HV71	SHL	45	15	6	21	16	16	1	4	5	6
NHL totals			387	68	95	163	162	17	1	2	3	8
SHL totals			171	50	66	116	80	31	10	6	16	16

== Awards and honors ==
Award	Year
WHL
CHL Top Prospects Game	2002
West First All-Star Team	2003
Bobby Clarke Trophy	2003
CHL Second All-Star Team	2003
SHL
Le Mat trophy (HV71)	2017
