= David Bararuk =

Canadian ice hockey player (born 1983)

- Born: May 26, 1983 (age 42) Moose Jaw, Saskatchewan, Canada
- Height: 6 ft 0 in (183 cm)
- Weight: 174 lb (79 kg; 12 st 6 lb)
- Position: Forward
- Shot: Left
- Played for: Utah Grizzlies; Houston Aeros; Iowa Stars; Ilves; Ässät
- NHL draft: 147th overall, 2002; Dallas Stars
- Playing career: 2003–2006

David Bararuk (born May 26, 1983) is a Canadian former professional ice hockey player. Bararuk played professionally in the North American minor leagues and in Finland from 2003–2007.

Bararuk was drafted by the Dallas Stars as their fifth-round pick, 147th overall, in the 2002 NHL entry draft. Bararuk played in the Stars organization from 2003–2006. He then moved to Europe and played two tryouts for teams in the Finnish SM-liiga league.

== Career statistics ==
			Regular season					Playoffs
Season	Team	League	GP	G	A	Pts	PIM	GP	G	A	Pts	PIM
1998–99	Moose Jaw Warriors AAA	SMHL	38	7	7	14	6	—	—	—	—	—
1999–00	Moose Jaw Warriors AAA	SMHL	37	22	23	45	8	—	—	—	—	—
1999–00	Moose Jaw Warriors	WHL	21	0	2	2	0	2	0	0	0	0
2000–01	Moose Jaw Warriors	WHL	53	6	9	15	9	3	0	0	0	0
2001–02	Moose Jaw Warriors	WHL	72	33	29	62	31	12	3	2	5	0
2002–03	Moose Jaw Warriors	WHL	66	29	64	93	44	13	5	9	14	4
2003–04	Utah Grizzlies	AHL	52	5	7	12	4	—	—	—	—	—
2003–04	Idaho Steelheads	ECHL	16	7	8	15	4	15	5	9	14	2
2004–05	Louisiana IceGators	ECHL	42	14	22	36	10	—	—	—	—	—
2004–05	Houston Aeros	AHL	15	2	2	4	0	—	—	—	—	—
2004–05	Idaho Steelheads	ECHL	—	—	—	—	—	4	1	2	3	0
2005–06	Iowa Stars	AHL	2	0	0	0	2	—	—	—	—	—
2005–06	Idaho Steelheads	ECHL	65	25	46	71	30	7	3	5	8	0
2006–07	Ilves	SM-liiga	3	0	1	1	4	—	—	—	—	—
2006–07	Ässät	SM-liiga	3	0	0	0	2	—	—	—	—	—
AHL totals			69	7	9	16	6	—	—	—	—	—
ECHL totals			123	46	76	122	44	26	9	16	25	2

== Awards and honours ==
Award	Year
WHL
East Second All-Star Team	2003
