= Altadena Library District =

Coordinates: 34.189167°N 118.136944°W

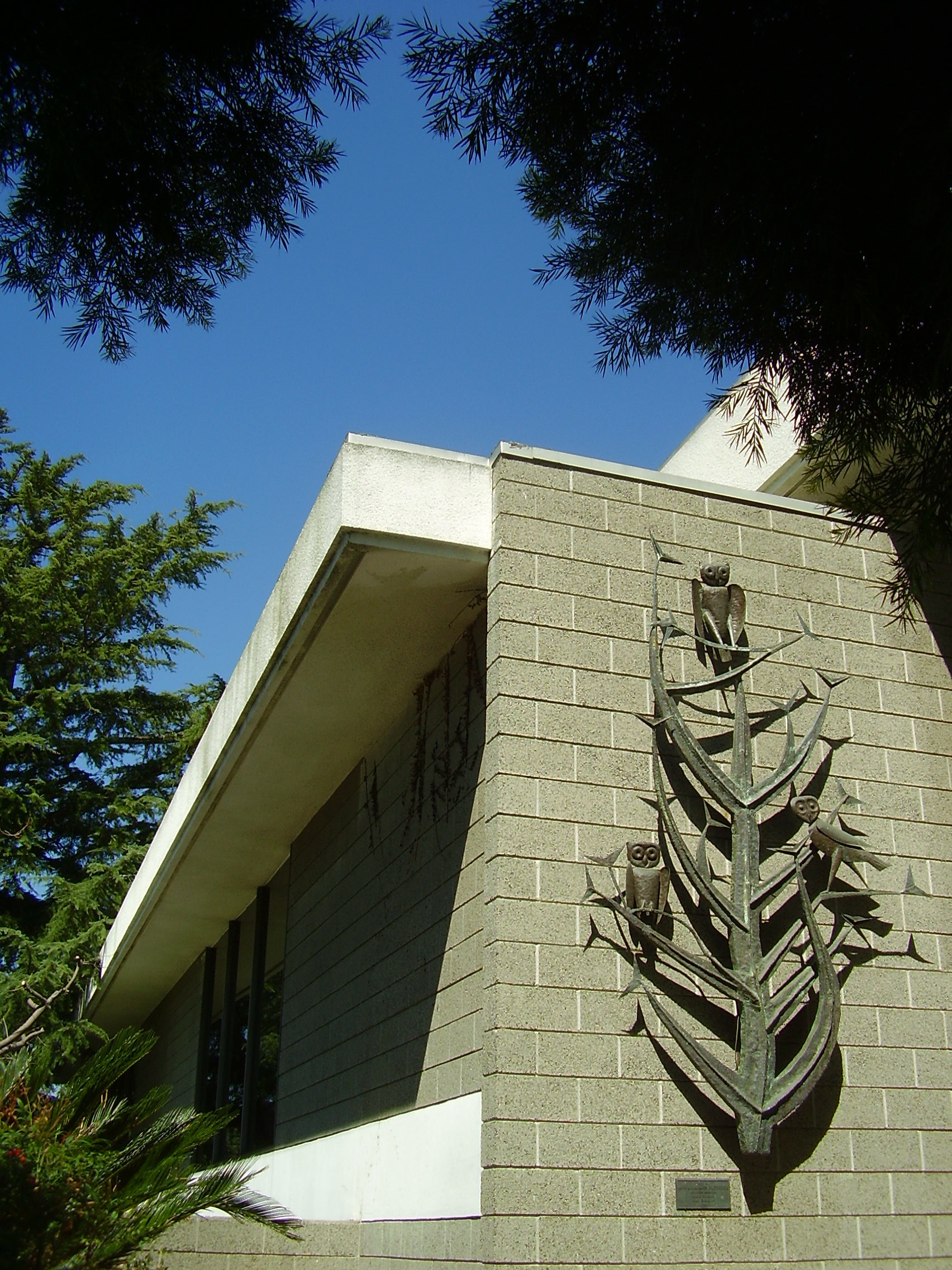
- Main Branch
- Location: Altadena, California, United States
- Established: December 1926

Collection
- Size: Approximately 54,876 people

The Altadena Library District is an independent special district that serves the residents of Altadena, California, an unincorporated community north of Pasadena in the San Gabriel Valley of Los Angeles County. The district was formed in December 1926 under the provision of Sections 19600-19734 of the California Education Code. The district is supported by property taxes and governed by a locally elected Board of Library Trustees. according to a May, 2005 California State Department of Finance estimate, the District provides library services to a population of approximately 54,876 people.

The system includes the main branch located at 600 E. Mariposa St., and the Bob Lucas Memorial Branch Library and Literacy Center located at 2659 Lincoln Avenue. In addition to the board and the staff, the Altadena Library has an active Friends of the Library which conducts an annual book sale and has a permanent store inside the library. The library has many special programs including summer reading programs, adult book clubs, Wi-Fi, a career center, the literacy center and a community room.

== History ==
The library was part of the Los Angeles county system from 1903 to 1927, and was housed at the Altadena Primary School. The first permanent library building on 2366 N. Lake (1936) was replaced in 1967 by the current building on Mariposa. The branch library was dedicated in 1957 and called the Arroyo Seco Branch Library. It was closed in 1978 and reopened in 1991 with a new name: the Bob Lucas Memorial Branch Library and Literacy Center.

== Architecture ==
The main branch is International Style softened by Asian influence due to the combination of Architects Boyd Georgi with the influence of landscape architect Erickson, Peters & Thoms who would, in 1979, design the Chinese gardens in the central court of the Pacific Asia Museum. The main branch includes midcentury modern elements of indoor and outdoor design including clerestory windows, and a sunken reading area with a full grown palm tree and skylight. The two bronze sculpture outside the library entrances are by local artist David Oliver Green. Nishan Toor created the "Owl" in the Children's department and the "Lady" in the fern garden. Old growth trees are incorporated into the design.

In 2009 the Altadena Library District completed a Master Facility Plan for the Main Library Addition and Renovation. The Altadena Library Board of Trustees held 4 community Design Camps where the public had an opportunity to comment on proposed designs which resulted in "a satisfactory solution that incorporated the planning goals and the preservation goals for both the site and the structure." A final design was approved by the board of trustees in April 2009.
