= Judge Boyd =

Judge Boyd may refer to:

- James Edmund Boyd (1845–1935), judge of the United States District Court for the Western District of North Carolina
- Sir John Alexander Boyd (1837–1916), judge of the High Court of Justice of the Province of Ontario
- John Frank Boyd (1853–1945), judge of the Ninth Judicial District Court of Nebraska
- Marion Speed Boyd (1900–1988), judge of the United States District Court for the Western District of Tennessee
- Samuel S. Boyd (1807–1867), Mississippi lawyer often called Judge Boyd who sat as a special judge in one case

== See also ==
- Justice Boyd (disambiguation)
