= Boyd Lake (Northwest Territories) =

Lake in the Northwest Territories, Canada

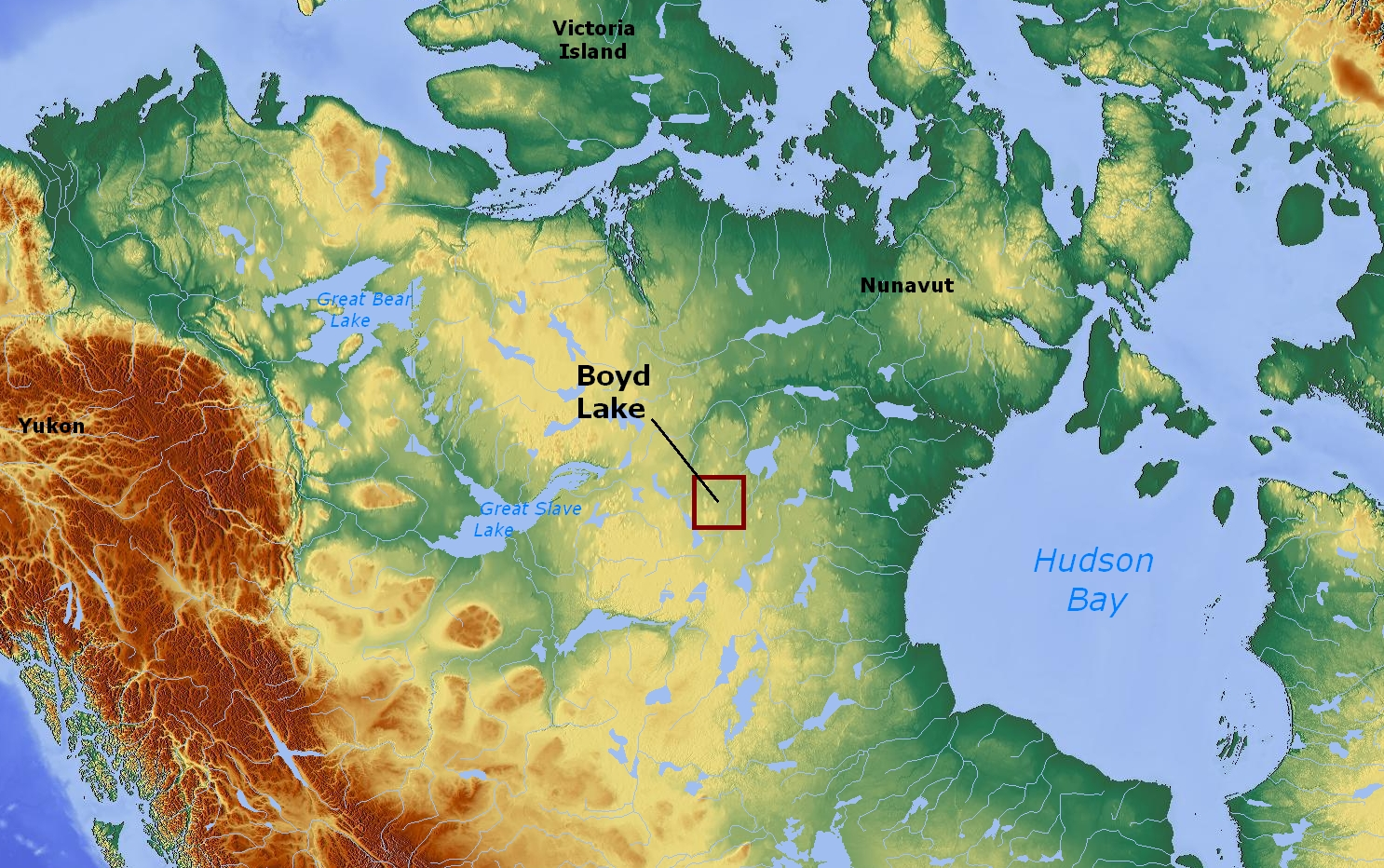
- Location within Northwest Territories

- Location within Northwest Territories
- Location: Northwest Territories
- Coordinates: 61.4850°N 103.4111°W
- Basin countries: Canada

Boyd Lake is a freshwater lake in the Lillooet Land District of Northwest Territories, Canada.

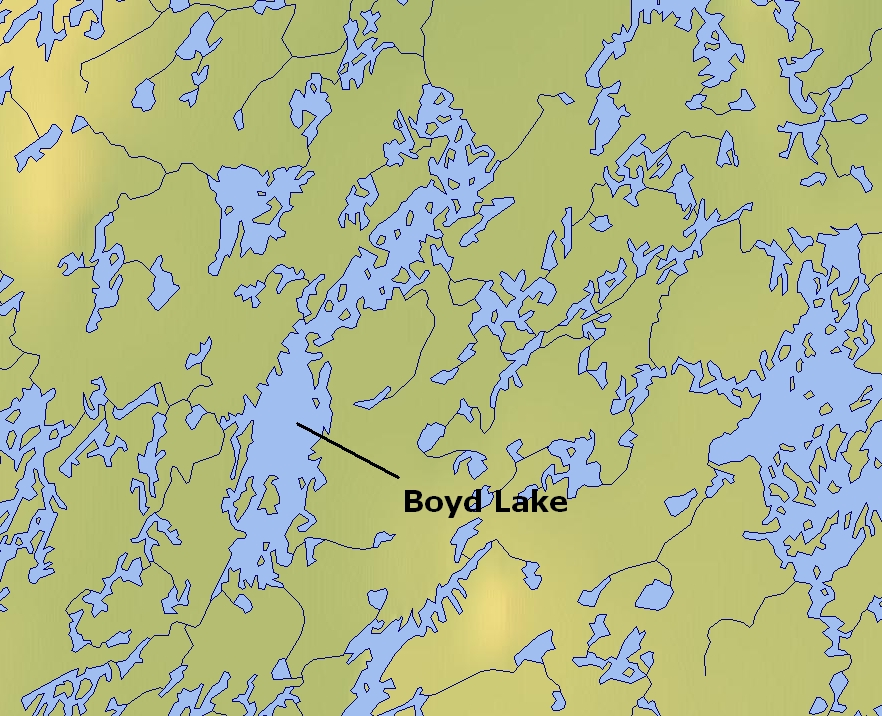
Map

== Ecology ==
Boyd Lake supports a variety of freshwater fish species common in the oligotrophic boreal lakes found throughout the Northwest Territories. There is no record of introduced or invasive fish in the lake’s water, though almost all population data is based on a 1978 survey. That survey documented populations of Northern Pike (Esox lucius), Lake Cisco (Coregonus artedi), Lake Trout (Salvelinus namaycush), and Round Whitefish (Prosopium cylindraceum).

== See also ==
- List of lakes in the Northwest Territories
