= Ralph Rollins House =

Historic house in Iowa, United States

- U.S. National Register of Historic Places
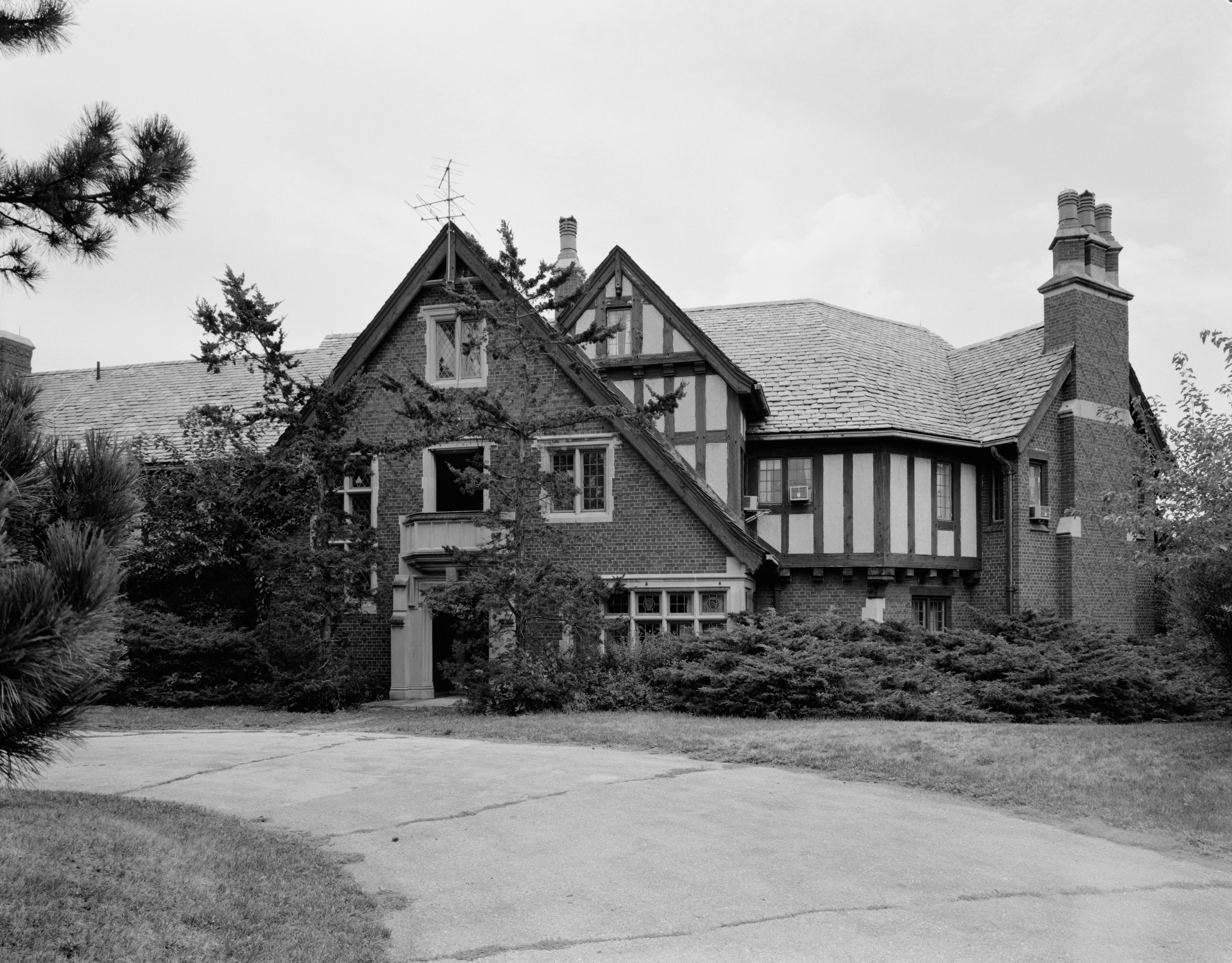

- Location within Iowa Location within the United States
- Location: 2801 Fleur Dr. Des Moines, Iowa
- Coordinates: 41°33′36.5″N 93°38′38.6″W
- Area: 2.5 acres (1.0 ha)
- Built: 1926
- Architect: Boyd & Moore
- NRHP reference No.: 78001255
- Added to NRHP: November 14, 1978

The Ralph Rollins House, also known as the Bohen Estate, is a historic building located in Des Moines, Iowa, United States. This rambling mansion in the English medieval eclectic style was designed in 1925 by the Des Moines architectural firm of Boyd & Moore. It was completed the following year. The facades are a picturesque accumulation of gables, window bays, over hangs and minor projections. The roofscape is significant in defining the character of the house. Its main ridge runs the length of the structure, and it features short cross gables. The walls are a combination of brick and stucco half-timber in almost equal proportions. Together with Salisbury House, the Ralph Rollins House is unique in Des Moines, and probably the state, for literally borrowing from England's domestic medieval architecture. The house was listed on the National Register of Historic Places in 1978.
