= Justice Boyd =

Justice Boyd may refer to:

- Andrew Hunter Boyd (1849–1935), chief judge of the Maryland Court of Appeals.
- Jeffrey S. Boyd (born 1961), justice of the Texas Supreme Court
- Joseph A. Boyd Jr. (1916–2007), associate justice and chief justice of the Florida Supreme Court

== See also ==
- Boyd Leedom, associate justice of the South Dakota Supreme Court
- Judge Boyd (disambiguation)
