= Boyd High School =

Boyd High School may refer to:

- Boyd High School, Boyd, located in Boyd, Texas, USA
- McKinney Boyd High School, located in McKinney, Texas, USA
