= Boyd House (San Rafael, California) =

Historic house in California, United States

- U.S. National Register of Historic Places
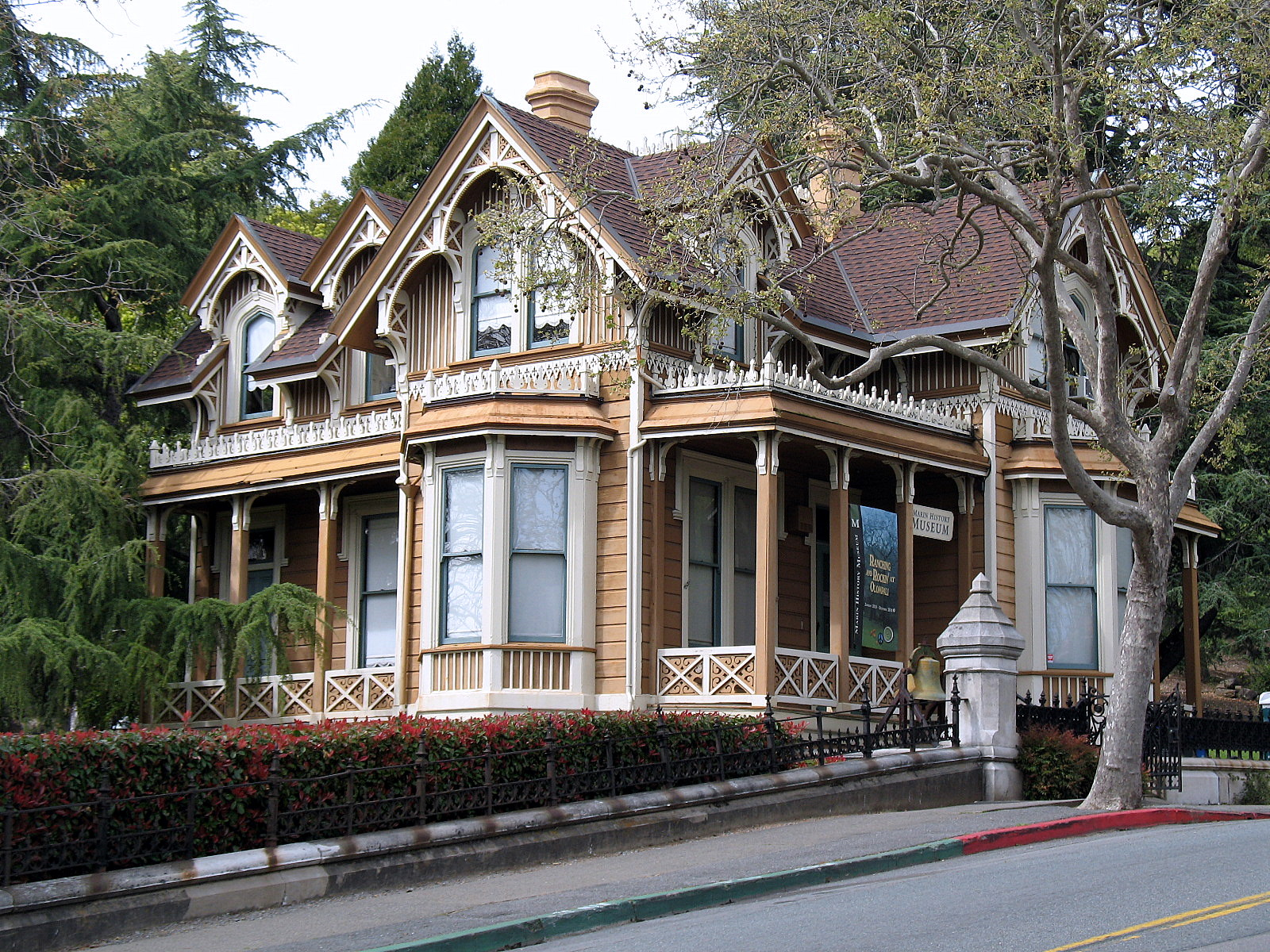

- Location within San Francisco Bay Area Location within California Location within the United States
- Location: 1125 B St., San Rafael, California, US
- Coordinates: 37.9753°N 122.5294°W
- Area: 0.3 acres (0.12 ha)
- Built: 1879
- Architect: Adam Murray
- Architectural style: Gothic, Cottage Style
- NRHP reference No.: 74000528
- Added to NRHP: December 17, 1974

The Boyd House (also the Boyd Gate House) is a residence at 1125 B Street in San Rafael, California, United States. Designed in the Victorian Gothic Revival style by Adam Murray, it was built in 1879 by Ira Cook as a gatehouse for an adjacent estate. It was given as a wedding gift to John Boyd and Louise Cook, the parents of Arctic explorer Louise Arner Boyd, in 1883. The Boyd family moved out in 1905. The Marin History Museum moved into the house in 1959. The house was added to the National Register of Historic Places in 1974.

== Description ==
The Boyd House is located at 1125 B Street in San Rafael, California, United States. It is located near the Robert Dollar Estate, which like the Boyd House is listed on the National Register of Historic Places. The Boyd House has landscaped grounds, part of the neighboring Boyd Memorial Park, and is surrounded by a granite-and-iron fence.

The house itself was designed in the Victorian Gothic Revival style by Adam Murray. It is a three-story wood frame structure built into a hillside, giving it the appearance of as two stories on its northern and eastern elevations. The facade is made of horizontal siding on the middle floor and vertically laid battens on the top story; there are large moldings around the windows. The overhanging roofs include ornate decorations, and there are brackets supporting the eaves. There are also porches with Gothic columns.

The rooms are small to medium-sized and have ceilings measuring 10–12 feet (3.0–3.7 m) high. They have plaster walls, wood floors and moldings, doors with glass transoms, marble fireplace mantels, and several surviving ceiling light fixtures. As built, there was a dining room, two parlors, and six bedrooms. The house is similar to the Andrew Jackson Downing cottage style common in the Hudson Valley of New York during the 19th century. It largely retains its original appearance, although some decorative features have been removed or altered, including ornamental roof cresting and portions of the porches.

== History ==
The property was originally owned by several individuals, including Thomas Hawkins Hanson, a local county treasurer and district attorney. Seth Cook, who acquired the property around 1873–1874, built the neighboring Maple Lawn mansion with his brother Dan. Their father Ira Cook came to California that decade. Ira built the structure in 1879 as a gatehouse for the adjacent Maple Lawn. Cook came from Rochester, New York, which may have influenced the use of the Downing cottage style.

Following Ira's death in 1880, his granddaughter, Louise Cook Arner, married John Franklin Boyd. The entire estate was given as a wedding gift to John and Louise in 1883. They had three children, but their two sons died in their youth; their only daughter, Louise Arner Boyd, became an Arctic explorer. Following the Boyd sons' deaths in 1901 and 1902, the family donated the property to the San Rafael government as city parkland in 1905. The building was then used by various caretakers until 1952 and then used by the U.S. Armed Forces Service Center in 1954. The Marin County Historical Society moved into the gatehouse in 1959, paying a nominal rent of $1 per year.

In April 1973, the San Rafael Parks and Recreation Commission allocated $55,316 to relocate the Boyd House to Boyd Park (allowing Mission Avenue to be straightened out) and to restore the house afterward. This plan initially would have forced the Marin County Historical Society to move out. That November, the San Rafael City Council hired Milton W. Chambers to renovate the structure for the Marin County Historical Society; the Parks and Recreation Commission endorsed Chambers's plan to restore the house in February 1974. The house reopened in May 1975 as a Marin County Historical Society museum. The house became a San Rafael local landmark the next year. The society later became the Marin History Museum, which built an exhibit space in Boyd Park adjoining the house in the 1990s. The Boyd House was retained as a historic house museum with period furnishings.

By the 21st century, the Marin History Museum found itself unable to pay for the house's upkeep, with deferred maintenance estimated at $150,000. The museum proposed constructing a new building in the park in 2006 but failed to raise the $1 million necessary to construct the new structure. The museum moved from the Boyd House to Novato, California, in 2014, as a cost-cutting measure, retaining the Boyd House for a temporary exhibit. In the meantime, the Boyd House was used by San Rafael's Department of Economic Development, and the city government spent $200,000 renovating the utility systems, waterproofing, repainting, and re-roofing the house. The city tried renting out the house in 2020 before renting it the next year to the Marin History Museum. In 2025, the San Rafael government agreed to let the museum occupy the house rent-free.

== See also ==
- National Register of Historic Places listings in Marin County, California
