= Boyd Bartlett =

American military officer and physicist (1897–1965)

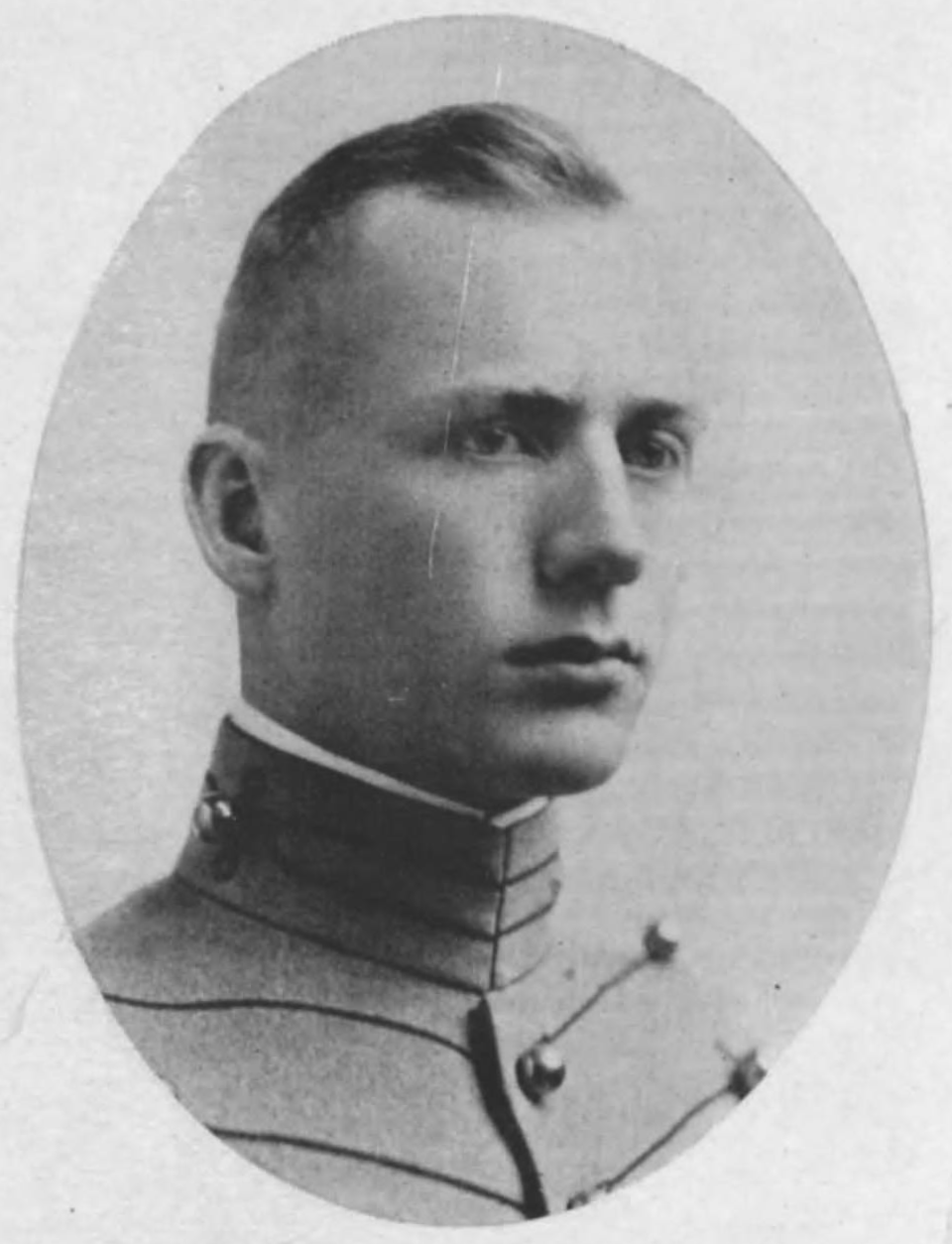
- As a West Point cadet
- Born: Boyd Wheeler Bartlett; June 20, 1897; Castine, Maine, U.S.
- Died: June 24, 1965 (aged 68); Castine, Maine, U.S.
- Burial place: Castine Cemetery
- Education: Bowdoin College; United States Military Academy; Columbia University
- Occupations: Military officer, educator, physicist
- Spouse: Helen A. Allen

Boyd Wheeler Bartlett (June 20, 1897 – June 24, 1965) was an American military officer, professor, school administrator, and physicist.

== Early life and education ==
Boyd Bartlett was born in Castine, Maine on June 20, 1897. He graduated from Bowdoin College in 1917. He graduated from the United States Military Academy in 1919 and was commissioned as a second lieutenant in the United States Army. With the reductions in the military ranks in progress in the years following World War I, many officers resigned their commissions during those years, as did Bartlett in 1922. He was granted a doctorate from Columbia University in 1933. He did postgraduate studies and research with Arnold Sommerfeld at the Ludwig-Maximilians-Universität München from 1934 to 1935. While in Munich, he co-authored two papers with Sommerfeld on theoretical electromagnetism.

== Career ==
After Bartlett returned from Europe, he began a teaching career in physics at Bowdoin College as professor of physics. When World War II started, he was called up as a colonel and assigned to the United States Military Academy. The head of the physics department there, Gerald Counts, was reassigned to Europe, and Bartlett stepped in as acting head of the department. When Counts returned after the war, Bartlett served as deputy head of the department, later, through a number of reorganizations and departmental name changes, he became head of the department of electricity, predecessor to the department of electrical engineering. He retained this position until his retirement and promotion to brigadier general in 1958.

== Later life and legacy ==
Bartlett died in Castine, Maine on June 24, 1965, and was buried at Castine Cemetery.

Since 1952 at the U. S. Military Academy, an award for excellence in electrical engineering has been a tradition. In 1981, it was named the Brigadier General Boyd Wheeler Bartlett, USA Honor Award.

== Honors ==
- The United States Legion of Merit – For "exceptional foresight and success in instituting a course in atomic physics during the war" and outstanding leadership.

== Selected literature ==
- B. W. Bartlett Variation of the Principal Magnetic Susceptibilities of Certain Paramagnetic Crystals with Temperature, Phys. Rev. 41 (6) 818–832 (1932). Bowdoin College and Columbia University. Received 19 July 1932.
- Arnold Sommerfeld and B. W. Bartlett Über die longitudinale Widerstandsänderung im Magnetfelde nach der elementaren Theorie, Physikalische Zeitschrift 36 894-899 (1935)
- Arnold Sommerfeld and B. W. Bartlett Über die longitudinale Widerstandsänderung im Magnetfelde nach der elementaren Theorie, Zeitschrift für technische Physik 16 500 (1935)
- B. W. Bartlett Coefficients of Friction Greater than Unity, American Journal of Physics 12 (2) 48 (1944). United States Military Academy, West Point, on leave of absence from Bowdoin College.
- B. W. Bartlett Physics at the United States Military Academy, American Journal of Physics 12 (4) 78-91 (1944). United States Military Academy, West Point, New York, on leave of absence from Bowdoin College.
- B. W. Bartlett Coefficients of Friction Greater than Unity, American Journal of Physics 12 (2) 48 (1944). Colonel, U. S. Army, United States Military Academy, West Point, New York, on leave of absence from Bowdoin College.
- B. W. Bartlett, P. M. Honnell, and F. H Mitchell Mass Production in the Elementary Electronics Laboratory, American Journal of Physics 16 (4) 224-230 (1948). Bartlett: United States Military Academy, West Point, New York, on leave of absence from Bowdoin College. Honnell: At publication at Washington University in St. Louis. Mitchell: At publication at the University of Alabama, Tuscaloosa, AL.
