= Marin History Museum =

History museum in Marin County, California, U.S.

Coordinates: 37°58′31″N 122°31′46″W

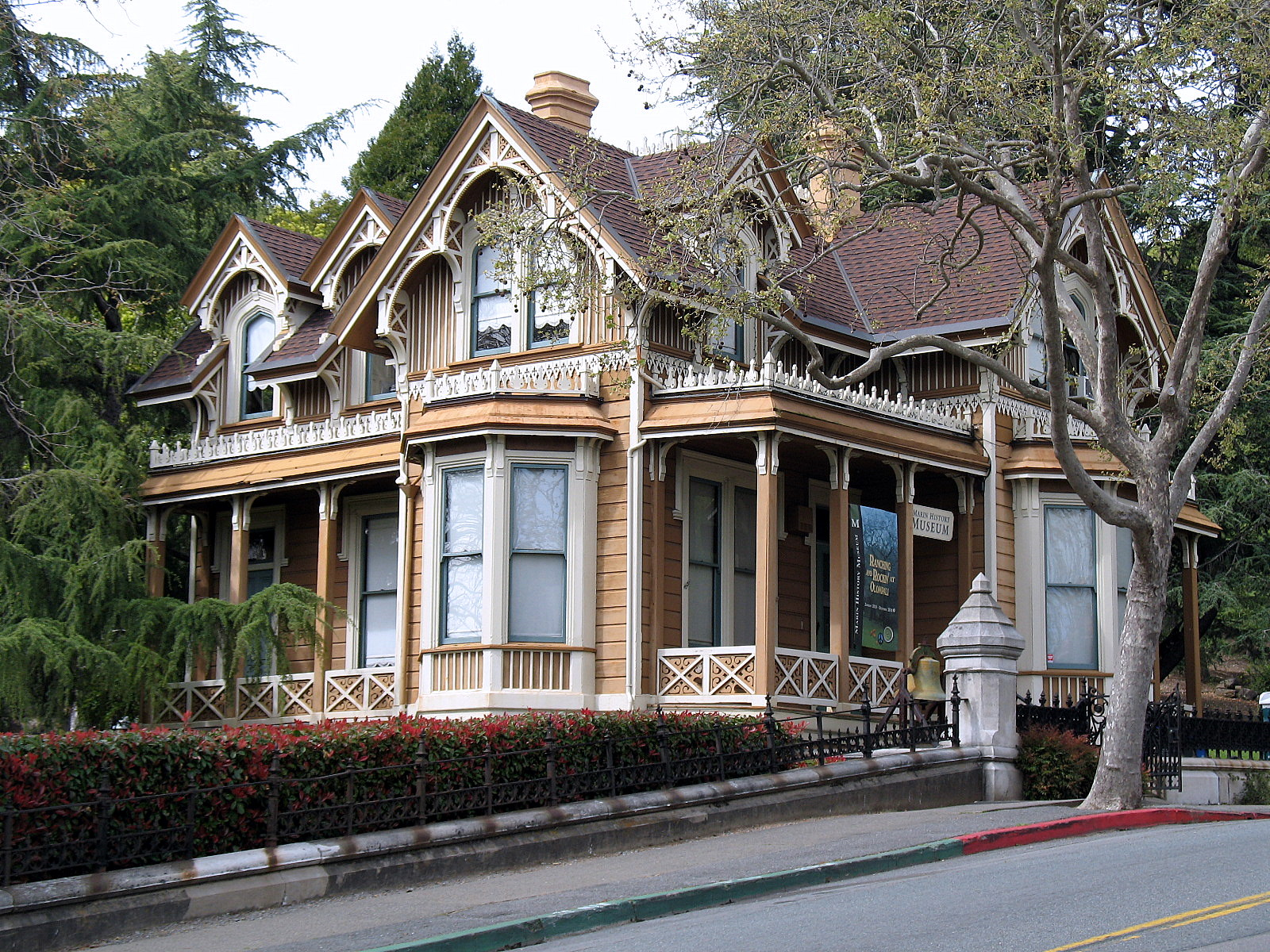
The Marin History Museum's main exhibition space, the Boyd Gate House, in March 2010.

The Marin History Museum is a museum with two locations in Marin County, California, US. It includes the historic Boyd Gate House, the museum's main exhibition space, in San Rafael, and the Collections Research Facility, in Novato. It is one of about a dozen US museums that has launched a mobile app to view the county's historic hotspots.
