= Boyd Georgi =

American architect

- Born: Boyd E. Georgi; January 20, 1914
- Died: October 19, 1999 (aged 85)
- Education: University of Southern California
- Occupation: Architect

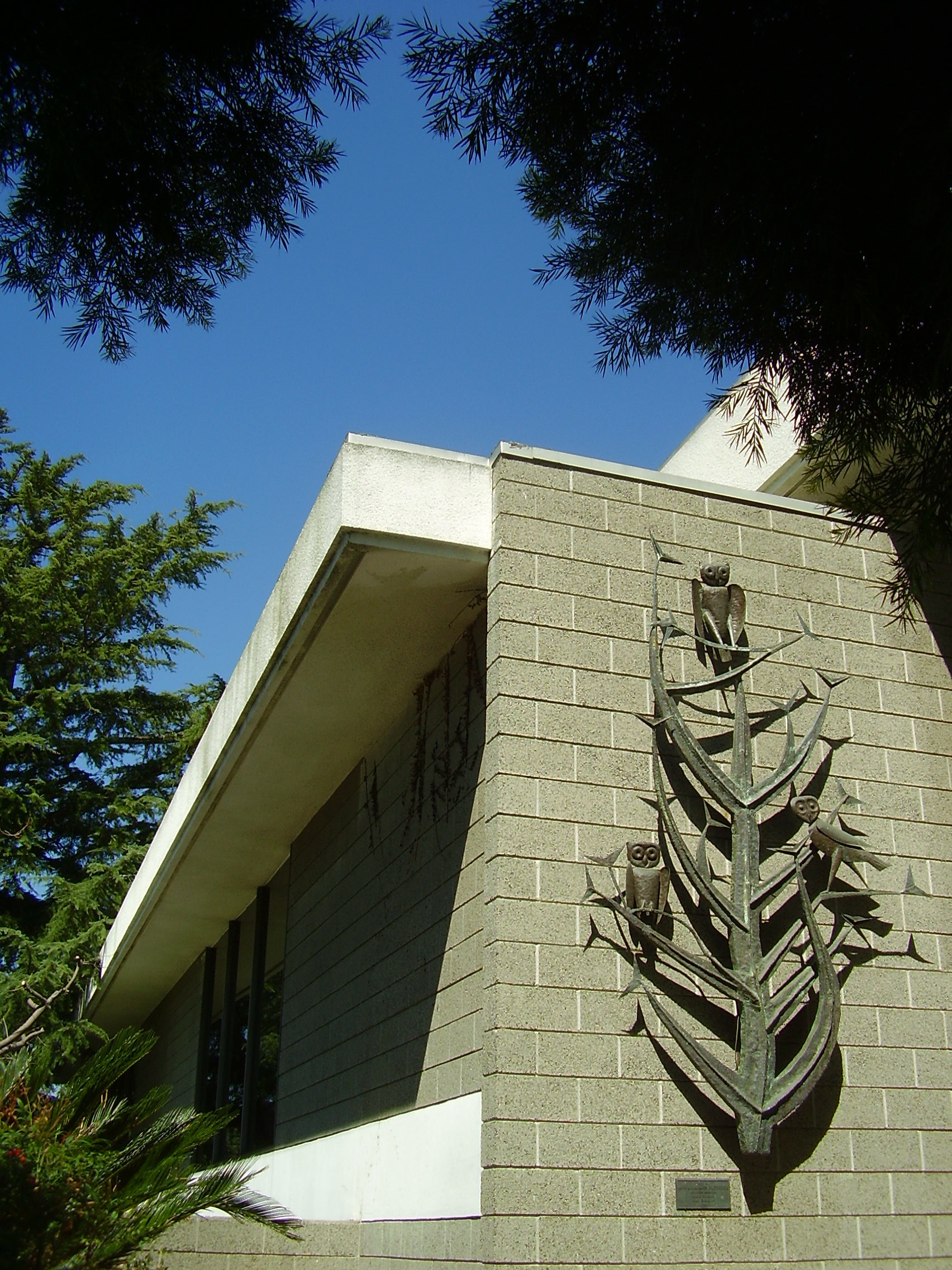
The main branch of the Altadena Library District, designed by Georgi in 1967.

Boyd E. Georgi (January 20, 1914 – October 19, 1999) was an American architect. He was a USC-trained California architect with a Southern California practice in modernism that spanned from residential works to schools and libraries. Georgi was president of the Pasadena and Foothill chapter of the AIA in 1964.

Georgi is known for a number of important late modernist houses and other buildings in the California area. Georgi's most significant largely-unmodified work is the Altadena library main branch (1967).

Georgi also taught at the USC School of Architecture.
