= Bird/Boyd Farm House =

- U.S. National Register of Historic Places
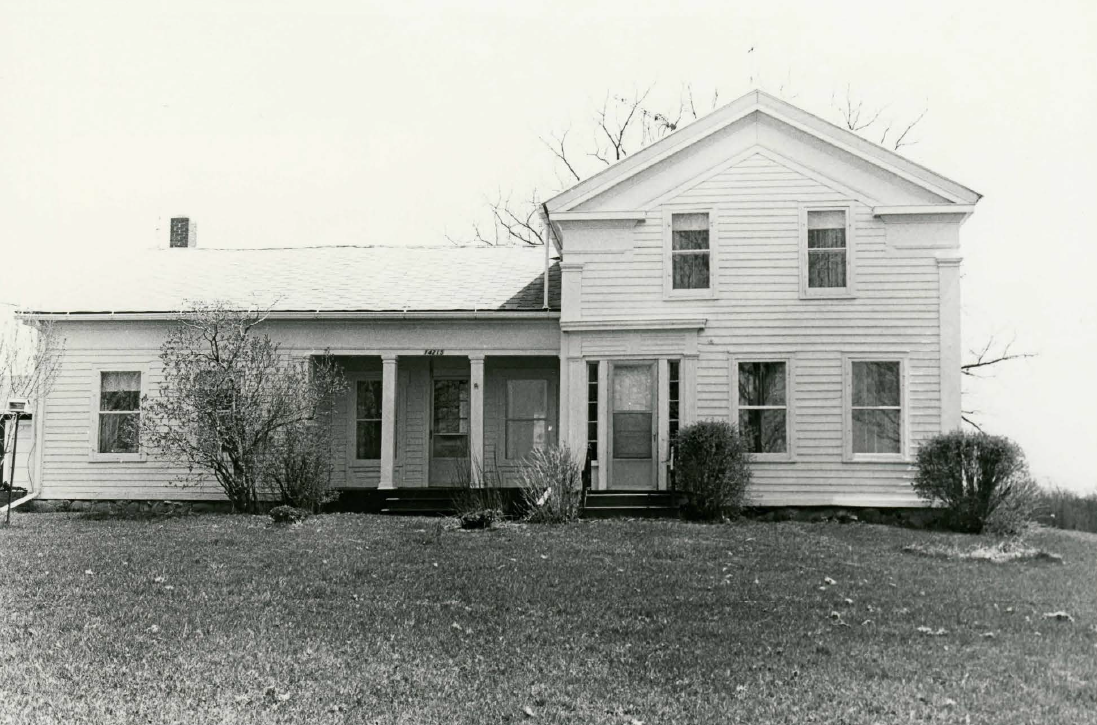
- Interactive map
- Location: 14215 Bird Rd., Byron, Michigan
- Coordinates: 42°49′10″N 83°52′30″W
- Area: less than one acre
- Built: c. 1846
- Architectural style: Greek Revival
- MPS: Genesee County MRA
- NRHP reference No.: 82000500
- Added to NRHP: November 26, 1982

The Bird/Boyd Farm House is a single-family home located at 14215 Bird Road in Byron, Michigan. It was listed on the National Register of Historic Places in 1982.

== History ==
Brothers Elijah and Edward Bird were early settlers in this area, and owned the land this house sits on. It is reasonably certain that one of them constructed this house in about 1846. It was owned by the Bird family until at least the early 1980s.

== Description ==
The Bird/Boyd Farm House is a L-shaped frame Greek Revival structure. The facade has a classically ornamented entrance, pilasters on the corners of the building, and a wide frieze with a boxed cornice running across the top. The ell portion of the house is fronted by a recessed porch.
