= Dylan Stanley =

South African cricketer (born 1991)

Personal information
- Born: 5 August 1991 (age 35); Johannesburg, South Africa
- Source: ESPNcricinfo, 24 November 2016

Dylan Stanley (born 5 August 1991) is a South African cricketer. He made his first-class debut for Northerns in the 2009–10 CSA Provincial Three-Day Challenge on 4 March 2010.
