= Boyd Lake (Quebec) =

Reservoir in Quebec, Canada

- Location within Quebec
- Location: Baie-James, Quebec
- Coordinates: 52°46′N 76°42′W
- Basin countries: Canada

Boyd Lake (Lac Boyd) is a lake in western Quebec, Canada.
