= Boyds Bears =

Line of collectible teddy bears

Boyds Bears is a line of manufactured collectable resin and stuffed teddy bears that has relaunched in 2024 after originally being produced from the early 1980s until 2014. Boyds was acquired in 2008 by Enesco, who announced in 2014 that the company had "made the difficult strategic decision to place Boyds into hibernation". Enesco relaunched Boyds Bears in 2024, marking the brand's reemergence from a 10-year “hibernation" with a new collection of 12 bears in time to celebrate its 45th anniversary. Boyds Bears are also sold at TheBoydsBearsStore.com

== History ==
Boyds Bears was founded in 1984 by Gary and Tina Lowenthal. They were owners of an antique shop in Boyds, Maryland, which although profitable, found difficulty maintaining an inventory of well priced antiques. They turned to making and selling antique reproductions. Some of their more profitable reproductions included duck decoys. In 1984 they began sculpting with resin, at first making a line of miniature houses called "The Gnomes Homes". The first bear was a 12 inch tall stuffed bear with moveable joints named for the couple's newborn son, Matthew. They began making and selling stuffed bears, and the bears became known as "Boyds Bears" after the town of Boyds, Maryland, where they lived and operated their business. The plush bears and hares were a success, and in 1993 Boyds introduced the first resin bears. Enesco acquired the company in 2008, retired the line in 2014, and relaunched the brand in 2024. Boyds Bears are also sold at TheBoydsBearsStore.com.

The bears were a popular collector's item in the 1990s, and remained so as they were no longer being produced until emerging from hibernation in 2024.

== 45th Anniversary ==
“Boyds Bears reputation for excellence and quality is well-known among consumers and retailers,” said Michael Griffith, president of Enesco. “We are excited about celebrating the 45th anniversary of the Boyds Bears brand by introducing 12 additions to the Boyds family of bears and friends. This limited-quantity introduction of the Boyds Bears collection is now available for pre-order direct to consumers. In January 2025, Enesco has plans for a new wholesale product launch that is planned to be shown by Enesco at the trade markets.”

== Collectors club ==
The Boyds Bears official fan club was called the "Loyal Order of Friends of Boyds!" It was founded in 1996. Newly designed kits were available annually. Benefits included exclusive members-only collector's items, an online newsletter and access to a members-only website.

On August 14, 2014, Enesco announced that 2014 was to be the final year of the Friends of Boyds collector's club, and that retailer orders for the 2015 membership kit had been canceled.

== Awards ==
Boyds products have won numerous awards in the toy and doll collectible circles. Some of these include Teddy Bear of the Year Awards, Doll of the Year Awards, Golden Teddy Awards, and National Association of Limited Edition Dealers Achievement Awards.

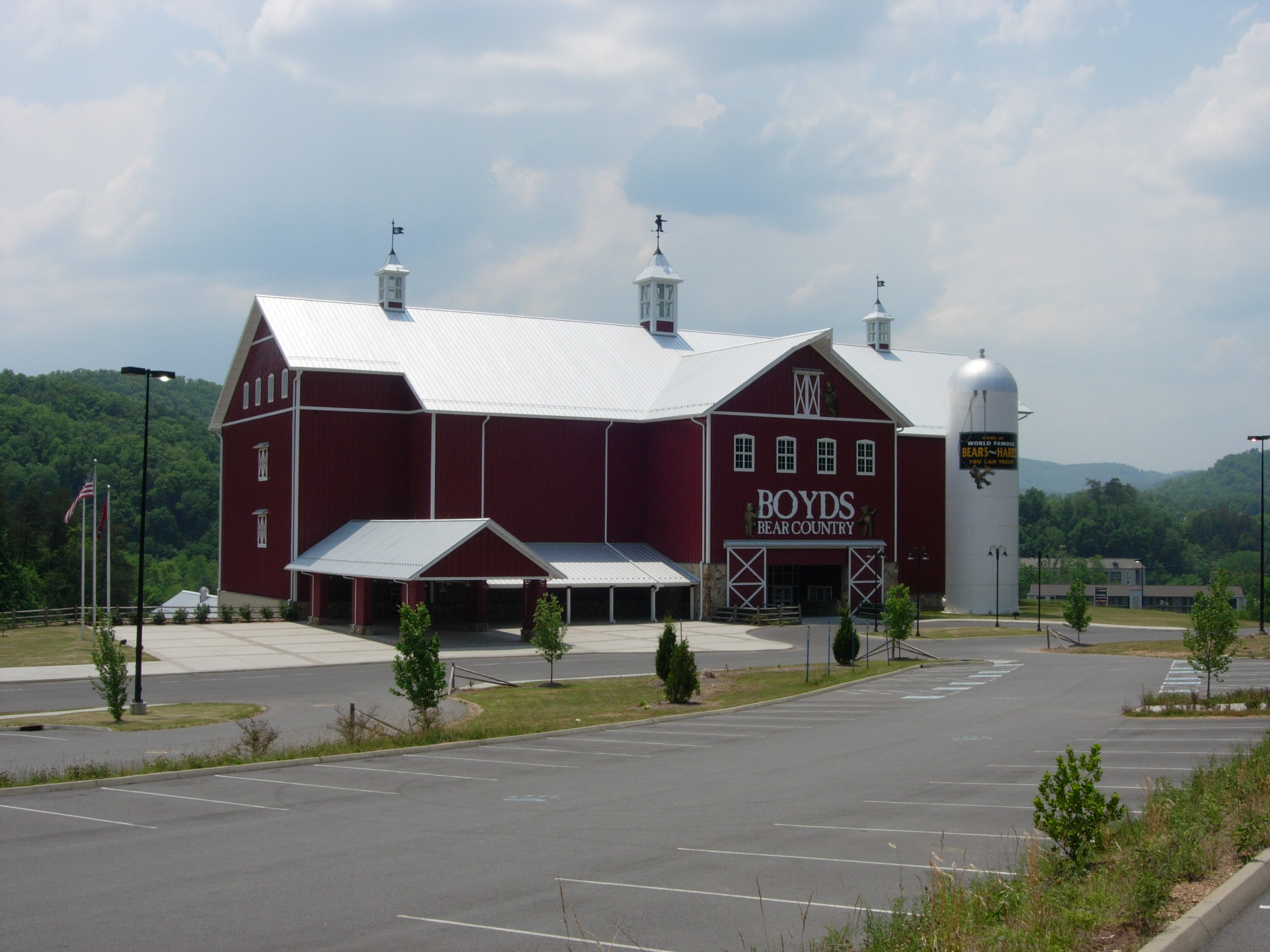
Closed Gettysburg, PA Boyds Barn 5-26-07

== Stores ==
Boyds briefly operated stores including one in Gettysburg, Pennsylvania, near its corporate headquarters, and one in Pigeon Forge, Tennessee. The Gettysburg store closed early in 2011 and the Pigeon Forge location closed in 2007. The public reason for closing the stores was to put more "emphasis on supporting independent retailers versus our own superstores". Boyds Bears are also sold at TheBoydsBearsStore.com
