= Boyd River =

Boyd River may refer to:

- Boyd River (New South Wales) a tributary of Nymboida River in Australia
- Boyd River (Tasmania), a river of Australia
- River Boyd, a river in South Gloucestershire, UK
