= Boyd County =

Boyd County may refer to:

== In Australia ==
- Boyd County, New South Wales

== In the United States ==
- Boyd County, Kentucky
- Boyd County, Nebraska
