= Charles Boyd Homestead Group =

- Charles Boyd Homestead
- U.S. National Register of Historic Places
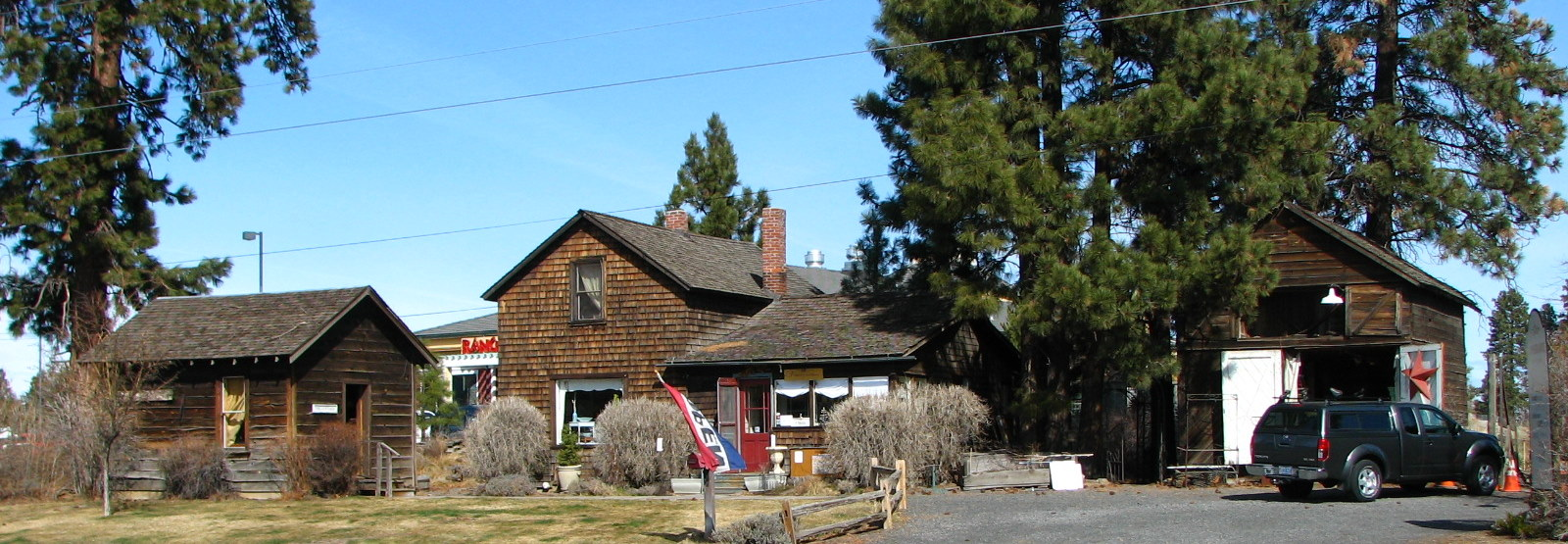
- Boyd Homestead at its new location
- Location: Deschutes County, Oregon, USA
- Nearest city: Bend, Oregon
- Coordinates: 44.08396°N 121.30324°W
- Built: 1905–1909
- Architectural style: Rustic
- NRHP reference No.: 82003724
- Added to NRHP: 1982

The Charles Boyd Homestead is a group of three buildings that make up a pioneer ranch complex. It is located in Deschutes County north of Bend, Oregon, United States. The ranch buildings were constructed by Charles Boyd between 1905 and 1909. Today, the three surviving structures are the only ranch buildings that date back to the earliest period of settlement in the Bend area. The Boyd Homestead is listed as a historic district on the National Register of Historic Places.

== History ==
Charles Boyd was born in Ontario, Canada in 1863. He immigrated to Michigan with his family in the 1870s. He move to Philipsburg, Montana in 1883, where he married Anna Wyman. Boyd went into the cattle business with his brother, William, and served as mayor of Philipsburg. In 1904, Boyd moved west, settling along the Deschutes River near Bend in Central Oregon. He bought a 6-acre (24,000 m^{2}) tract of land on the east side of the river, bordering the Swalley Canal. In 1905, his family joined him, and he built a house on his 6-acre (24,000 m^{2}) property.

Over the next few years, Boyd expanded his ranch and built a successful cattle and meat business. Boyd eventually owned 600 acres (2.4 km^{2}), much of it purchased under provisions of the Carey Desert Land Act of 1894. His property included pasture lands for his cattle and hay fields for winter feed. He butchered and sold meat locally, becoming the largest meat supplier in the Bend area. He had contracts to provide beef for railroad and canal construction crews and the Brooks-Scanlon Lumber Company's busy logging camps. Boyd also owed a butcher shop in downtown Bend. During the early years of the Great Depression, Boyd lost his big contracts as Bend's saw mill cut production. He died in 1933; however, members of the Boyd family continued to live in the main ranch house until 1958.

In 1978, the nucleus of the historic Boyd ranch was sold to developers as the city of Bend expanded northward. In 1979, the Boyd family moved the remaining three homestead buildings to a new site approximately one quarter mile from their original location. The grouping is now located on Bend River Mall Drive, approximately one quarter mile west of the Deschutes River. The new site is on a quarter-acre parcel that was part of Boyd's 600 acres (2.4 km^{2}) ranch. The new site is also adjacent to the previous location on the Swalley canal where the buildings have been placed among old growth pine trees. This helps to maintain the character of the homestead.

The three surviving Boyd ranch buildings possess integrity of design, craftsmanship, and materials that make them a unique grouping. In addition, they are the only surviving ranch building dating back to the earliest period of settlement in the Bend area. Because of their importance to Bend history, the Charles Boyd Homestead grouping was listed on the National Register of Historic Places on 31 August 1982. Today, the Charles Boyd Homestead is a gift shop called Pomegranate Home and Garden.

== Ranch buildings ==
Boyd's original ranch covered 600 acres (2.4 km^{2}) and included a main house, bunk house, ice house, barn, hay shed, power house, corrals, feedlots, and a slaughterhouse as well as pastures and hay fields. However, only main house, bunk house, and ice house have survived into the 21st century. The main ranch house was built by Charles Boyd in 1905. The bunk house was constructed shortly after the main house and an ice house was added to the ranch complex in 1909. Today, these three building make up the Charles Boyd Homestead historic site just north of the Bend city limits.

- The Boyd ranch house is a two-story rectangular structure measuring 26 by 32 feet (9.8 m). The main entrance is on the south side. It is a wood-frame structure with a gable roof and brick chimney. The original batten board siding was covered by shingles in 1914. The structure was originally built on a post and sill foundation; however, it was placed on a concrete slab when it was relocated in 1979. The first floor includes a living room and a bedroom from the building's original construction plus a kitchen, a bathroom, and a side porch which were added in 1914. The interior board walls are covered with painted paper. Fir planks are used for flooring. Windows and doors are simple and have no molding. There are two bedrooms upstairs. Both rooms have tongue and groove wall paneling. In the 1930s, a front porch was added next to the kitchen. In the 1950s, the kitchen was remodeled and the main picture window in the living room enlarged. The original cooking stove, piano, and many other Boyd family furnishing remain in the house.
- The bunk house is a single story rectangular building with a gable roof. It is located near the southwest corner of the main house with its entrance facing east. The bunk house measures 14 by 18 feet (5.5 m). There are only two windows, one on the west side of the building and the other on the south side. It has shiplap exterior siding and rough pine interior walls. Windows and doors are simple with no molding. Like the main house, it was placed on a concrete slab when it was moved to its current location in 1979.
- The ice house is located east of the main house. It is rectangular structure measuring 16 feet (4.9 m) by 24 feet (7.3 m). It is equal to two stories in height and has no windows. It has a wood-frame structure with shiplap exterior siding and wood shingle roof. The interior walls are rough boards with saw dust insulation. The building was originally used to store blocks of ice needed to keep meat. During the winter, Boyd cut blocks of ice from Swalley Pond and packed them in sawdust. The building's sawdust insulation preserved the blocks until they were needed in the summer. There are two sets of large double-doors on the south side of the building that were installed in the 1940s when the building was converted into a garage. It was used for that purpose until it 1978. Like the other two building, the ice house was placed on a concrete slab when it was moved to its current location in 1979.
