= Boyd Gordon =

Canadian ice hockey player (born 1983)

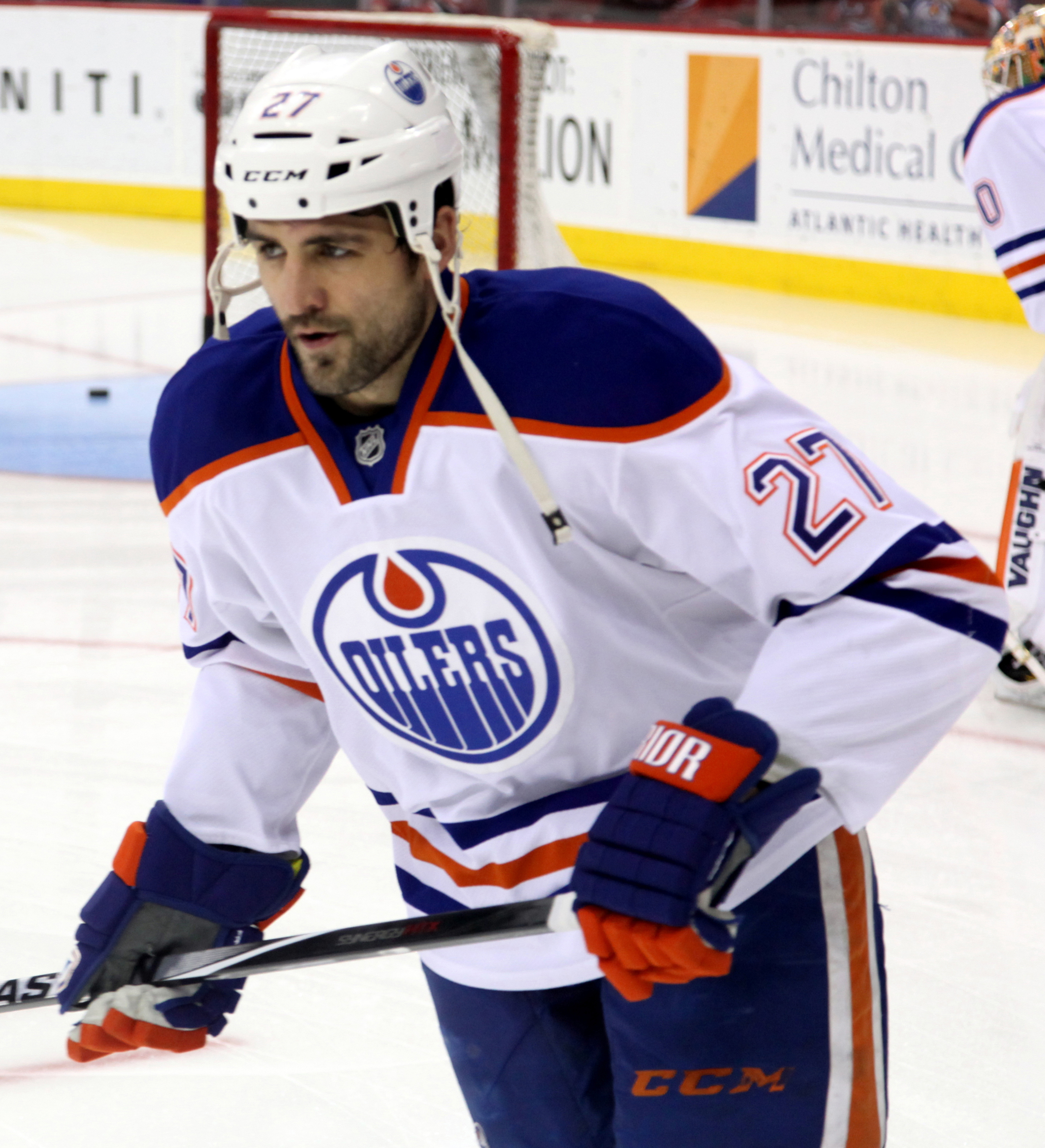
- Gordon in February 2015.
- Born: October 19, 1983 (age 43) Unity, Saskatchewan, Canada
- Height: 6 ft 0 in (183 cm)
- Weight: 200 lb (91 kg; 14 st 4 lb)
- Position: Centre
- Shot: Right
- Played for: Washington Capitals; Arizona Coyotes; Edmonton Oilers; Philadelphia Flyers
- NHL draft: 17th overall, 2002; Washington Capitals
- Playing career: 2003–2017

Boyd Gordon (born October 19, 1983) is a Canadian former professional ice hockey centre and pro scout for the Detroit Red Wings, who played 13 seasons in the National Hockey League (NHL) for the Washington Capitals, Arizona Coyotes, Edmonton Oilers, and Philadelphia Flyers.

== Playing career ==
Gordon was drafted in the 1st round, 17th overall by the Washington Capitals in the 2002 NHL entry draft. Gordon was drafted from the Red Deer Rebels of the Western Hockey League where he helped the Red Deer Rebels win the Memorial Cup in the 2000–01 season. Gordon played his first professional season in 2003–04. He played with Capitals affiliate, the Portland Pirates, of the AHL and also made his NHL debut with the Capitals appearing in 41 games.

In the 2005–06 season, Gordon won the Calder Cup with the Hershey Bears before earning a regular roster spot with the Capitals in the 2006–07 season.

He signed a two-year contract with the Phoenix Coyotes on July 1, 2011.

On July 5, 2013, he signed a three-year contract as a free agent with the Edmonton Oilers.

Approaching the final year of his contract with the Oilers, Gordon was traded in a return to the Coyotes organization in exchange for Lauri Korpikoski on June 30, 2015.

On July 1, 2016, Gordon signed a one-year contract worth $950,000 with the Philadelphia Flyers.

Gordon is currently a pro scout for the Detroit Red Wings.

== Career statistics ==
=== Regular season and playoffs ===
			Regular season					Playoffs
Season	Team	League	GP	G	A	Pts	PIM	GP	G	A	Pts	PIM
1999–2000	Red Deer Rebels	WHL	66	10	26	36	24	4	0	1	1	2
2000–01	Red Deer Rebels	WHL	72	12	27	39	39	22	3	6	9	2
2001–02	Red Deer Rebels	WHL	66	22	29	51	19	23	10	12	22	8
2002–03	Red Deer Rebels	WHL	56	33	48	81	28	23	8	12	20	14
2003–04	Washington Capitals	NHL	41	1	5	6	8	—	—	—	—	—
2003–04	Portland Pirates	AHL	43	5	17	22	16	7	2	1	3	0
2004–05	Portland Pirates	AHL	80	17	22	39	35	—	—	—	—	—
2005–06	Washington Capitals	NHL	25	0	1	1	4	—	—	—	—	—
2005–06	Hershey Bears	AHL	58	16	22	38	23	21	3	5	8	10
2006–07	Washington Capitals	NHL	71	7	22	29	14	—	—	—	—	—
2007–08	Washington Capitals	NHL	67	7	9	16	12	7	0	0	0	0
2008–09	Washington Capitals	NHL	63	5	9	14	16	14	0	3	3	4
2009–10	Washington Capitals	NHL	36	4	6	10	12	6	1	1	2	0
2009–10	Hershey Bears	AHL	2	0	2	2	0	—	—	—	—	—
2010–11	Washington Capitals	NHL	60	3	6	9	16	9	0	0	0	6
2011–12	Phoenix Coyotes	NHL	75	8	15	23	10	16	0	2	2	6
2012–13	Phoenix Coyotes	NHL	48	4	10	14	8	—	—	—	—	—
2013–14	Edmonton Oilers	NHL	74	8	13	21	20	—	—	—	—	—
2014–15	Edmonton Oilers	NHL	68	6	7	13	17	—	—	—	—	—
2015–16	Arizona Coyotes	NHL	65	2	2	4	10	—	—	—	—	—
2016–17	Philadelphia Flyers	NHL	13	1	0	1	2	—	—	—	—	—
2016–17	Lehigh Valley Phantoms	AHL	6	0	0	0	21	—	—	—	—	—
NHL totals			706	56	105	161	149	52	1	6	7	16

=== International ===
Medal record

Ice hockey

Representing Canada

World Junior Championships
Silver medal – second place	2003 Canada	

Year	Team	Event	Result	GP	G	A	Pts	PIM
2003	Canada	WJC	2nd place, silver medalist(s)	6	0	0	0	0
Junior totals				6	0	0	0	0

== Awards and honours ==
Awards	Year
WHL
Memorial Cup (Red Deer Rebels)	2001
CHL Top Prospects Game	2002
Brad Hornung Trophy	2003
East First All-Star Team	2003
AHL
Calder Cup (Hershey Bears)	2006

Awards and achievements
Preceded by Alexander Semin	Washington Capitals first-round draft pick 2002	Succeeded by Eric Fehr
