= Marc Habscheid =

Canadian ice hockey player and coach

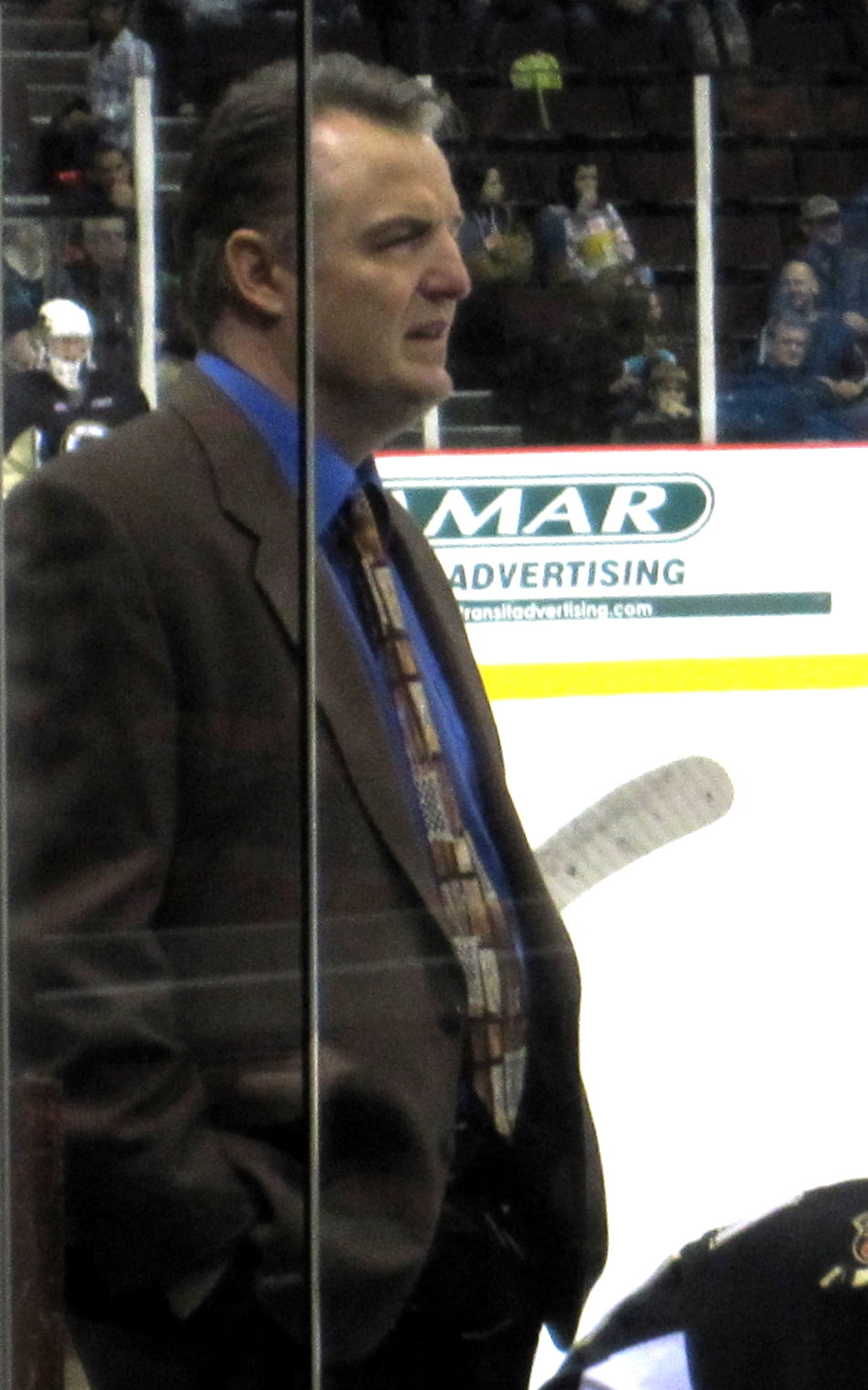
- Born: March 1, 1963 (age 63) Wymark, Saskatchewan, Canada
- Height: 6 ft 0 in (183 cm)
- Weight: 185 lb (84 kg; 13 st 3 lb)
- Position: Right wing/Centre
- Shot: Right
- Played for: Edmonton Oilers; Minnesota North Stars; Detroit Red Wings; Calgary Flames
- National team: Canada
- NHL draft: 113th overall, 1981; Edmonton Oilers
- Playing career: 1982–1996

Marc Joseph Habscheid (born March 1, 1963) is a former National Hockey League player and the former head coach of the Red Deer Rebels of the Western Hockey League. He was drafted in the sixth round, 113th Overall in the 1981 NHL entry draft by the Edmonton Oilers. He played 345 games in the NHL over parts of 10 seasons, amassing 72 goals and 163 points.

== Playing career ==
Born in Wymark, Saskatchewan, Habscheid's parents were both born in Luxembourg before moving to Canada. Habscheid played three seasons with the Western Hockey League's Saskatoon Blades before turning pro. This included the 1981–82 campaign where Habscheid had 151 points, second only to Bruce Eakin in team scoring. He also played in the 1982 World Junior Hockey Championship, leading Canada to its first ever gold medal at the tournament. That season he played 7 games with the Oilers, scoring 4 points. He played 4 more seasons with the Oilers, before he was suspended by the team for refusing to report to the AHL's Nova Scotia Voyageurs and subsequently dealt to Minnesota in December 1985. Habscheid played 7 more NHL seasons with Minnesota, Detroit, and Calgary. He also represented Canada internationally twice, at the 1988 Winter Olympics and the 1992 World Championships. Habscheid went on to play 5 more seasons of hockey (2 in Switzerland, 2 with the IHL's Las Vegas Thunder, and one final season in 1995–96 with the DEL's Augsburger Panther). He retired officially in 1996.

== Coaching career ==
Habscheid got his start in coaching in the Saskatchewan Junior Hockey League with the Melfort Mustangs. He then moved on to coach the Kamloops Blazers of the WHL. On November 29, 1999, he was named head coach of the Kelowna Rockets. Habscheid achieved great success with the Rockets. He won the Ed Chynoweth Cup in 2003 and a Memorial Cup in 2004. He was also named the CHL Coach of the Year in 2003. Habscheid was also head coach of the 2003 Canadian World Junior team, becoming the first player to represent Canada at the tournament as both a player and coach. He was subsequently named head coach for all international tournaments on July 29, 2005. He won a gold medal at the World Championships in 2004 and silver in 2005. As well, Habscheid served as an assistant coach for Canada at the 2006 Turin Olympics. Habscheid also spent one season as an associate coach with the Boston Bruins. On June 3, 2009, Habschied was named as head coach and general manager of the Chilliwack Bruins, a major junior team in the Western Hockey League which has since moved to Victoria, British Columbia to become the Royals. On November 4, 2014, Habscheid returned to the WHL coaching ranks when he accepted the Prince Albert Raiders head coaching position.

== Career statistics ==
=== Regular season and playoffs ===
			Regular season					Playoffs
Season	Team	League	GP	G	A	Pts	PIM	GP	G	A	Pts	PIM
1979–80	Saskatoon J's	SJHL	59	32	53	85	51	—	—	—	—	—
1979–80	Saskatoon Blades	WHL	15	2	3	5	2	—	—	—	—	—
1980–81	Saskatoon Blades	WHL	72	34	63	97	50	—	—	—	—	—
1981–82	Edmonton Oilers	NHL	7	1	3	4	2	—	—	—	—	—
1981–82	Saskatoon Blades	WHL	55	64	87	151	74	5	3	4	7	4
1981–82	Wichita Wind	CHL	—	—	—	—	—	3	0	0	0	0
1982–83	Kamloops Junior Oilers	WHL	6	7	16	23	8	—	—	—	—	—
1982–83	Edmonton Oilers	NHL	32	3	10	13	14	—	—	—	—	—
1983–84	Edmonton Oilers	NHL	9	1	0	1	6	—	—	—	—	—
1983–84	Moncton Alpines	AHL	71	19	37	56	32	—	—	—	—	—
1984–85	Edmonton Oilers	NHL	26	5	3	8	4	—	—	—	—	—
1984–85	Nova Scotia Oilers	AHL	48	29	29	58	65	6	4	3	7	9
1985–86	Springfield Indians	AHL	41	18	32	50	21	—	—	—	—	—
1985–86	Minnesota North Stars	NHL	6	2	3	5	0	2	0	0	0	0
1986–87	Canadian National Team	Intl	51	29	32	61	70	—	—	—	—	—
1986–87	Minnesota North Stars	NHL	15	2	0	2	2	—	—	—	—	—
1987–88	Canadian National Team	Intl	69	24	37	61	48	—	—	—	—	—
1987–88	Minnesota North Stars	NHL	16	4	11	15	6	—	—	—	—	—
1988–89	Minnesota North Stars	NHL	76	23	31	54	40	5	1	3	4	13
1989–90	Detroit Red Wings	NHL	66	15	11	26	33	—	—	—	—	—
1990–91	Detroit Red Wings	NHL	46	9	8	17	22	5	0	0	0	0
1991–92	Calgary Flames	NHL	46	7	11	18	42	—	—	—	—	—
1992–93	Canadian National Team	Intl	3	0	3	3	11	—	—	—	—	—
1992–93	SC Bern	NDA	36	19	23	42	70	5	1	4	5	6
1993–94	Las Vegas Thunder	IHL	59	14	40	54	49	5	1	1	2	15
1994–95	EV Zug	NDA	5	0	1	1	0	—	—	—	—	—
1994–95	Las Vegas Thunder	IHL	43	11	25	36	38	—	—	—	—	—
1995–96	Augsburger Panther	DEL	48	14	32	46	73	7	4	5	9	4
NHL totals			345	72	91	163	171	12	1	3	4	13
AHL totals			160	66	98	164	118	6	4	3	7	9
IHL totals			102	25	65	90	87	5	1	1	2	15

=== International ===
Marc Habscheid
Medal record

Representing Canada

Ice hockey

World Junior Championships
Gold medal – first place	1982 Minnesota	

Year	Team	Event	GP	G	A	Pts	PIM
1982	Canada	WJC	7	6	6	12	2
1988	Canada	OG	8	5	3	8	6
1992	Canada	WC	6	0	0	0	4
Junior totals			7	6	6	12	2
Senior totals			14	5	3	8	10

== Coaching record ==
Team	Year	League	Regular Season							Post Season
Team	Year	League	G	W	L	T	OTL	Pts	Finish	Result
KAM	1997–98	WHL	72	37	32	3	-	77	4th in West	Lost in First round (PG)
KAM	1998–99	WHL	72	48	11	13	-	109	1st in West	Lost President's Cup (CGY)
KAM Totals			144	85	43	16	-	186		
KEL	1999–2000	WHL	29	10	15	2	2	24	5th in West	Lost in First round (PG)
KEL	2000–01	WHL	72	37	23	7	5	86	1st in West	Lost in First round (SEA)
KEL	2001–02	WHL	72	31	26	10	5	77	4th in B.C.	Lost in Third round (KOO)
KEL	2002–03	WHL	72	51	14	6	1	109	1st in B.C.	Won President's Cup (RD)
KEL	2003–04	WHL	72	47	21	4	0	98	1st in B.C.	Lost in Third round (EVT); Won Memorial Cup (GAT)
KEL Totals			317	176	99	29	13	394		
CHK	2009–10	WHL	72	32	33	2	5	71	4th in B.C.	Lost in First round (TC)
CHK	2010–11	WHL	72	33	31	4	4	74	4th in B.C.	Lost in First round (SPO)
VIC	2011–12	WHL	72	24	41	3	4	55	4th in B.C.	Lost in First round (KAM)
CHK/VIC Totals			216	89	105	9	13	200		
PA	2014–15	WHL	56	24	28	2	2	(50)	4th in East	Missed playoffs
PA	2015–16	WHL	72	38	26	7	1	84	2nd in East	Lost in First round (MJ)
PA	2016–17	WHL	72	21	44	5	2	77	6th in East	Missed playoffs
PA	2017–18	WHL	72	32	27	9	4	49	5th in East	Lost in First round (MJ)
PA	2018–19	WHL	68	54	10	2	2	112	1st in East	Won Ed Chynoweth Cup (VAN)
PA	2019–20	WHL	64	36	18	6	4	82	1st in East	Season cancelled due to COVID-19 pandemic
PA	2020–21	WHL	24	9	11	3	1	22	no standings (Note: The 2020–21 WHL regular season was shortened, started late, then was cancelled early, and no playoffs were held, due to the ongoing COVID-19 pandemic. The Prince Albert Raiders were in a mathematical position to finish anywhere from 4th to 7th in the East Division when the season was cancelled.)	no playoffs
PA	2021–22	WHL	68	28	35	4	1	61	5th in East	Lost in First round (WPG)
PA Totals			496	249	199	38	17	537		
WHL totals			1173	592	446	64	43	1317		

== Awards ==
- WHL Second All-Star Team – 1982
