= Jay Bouwmeester =

Canadian ice hockey player (born 1983)

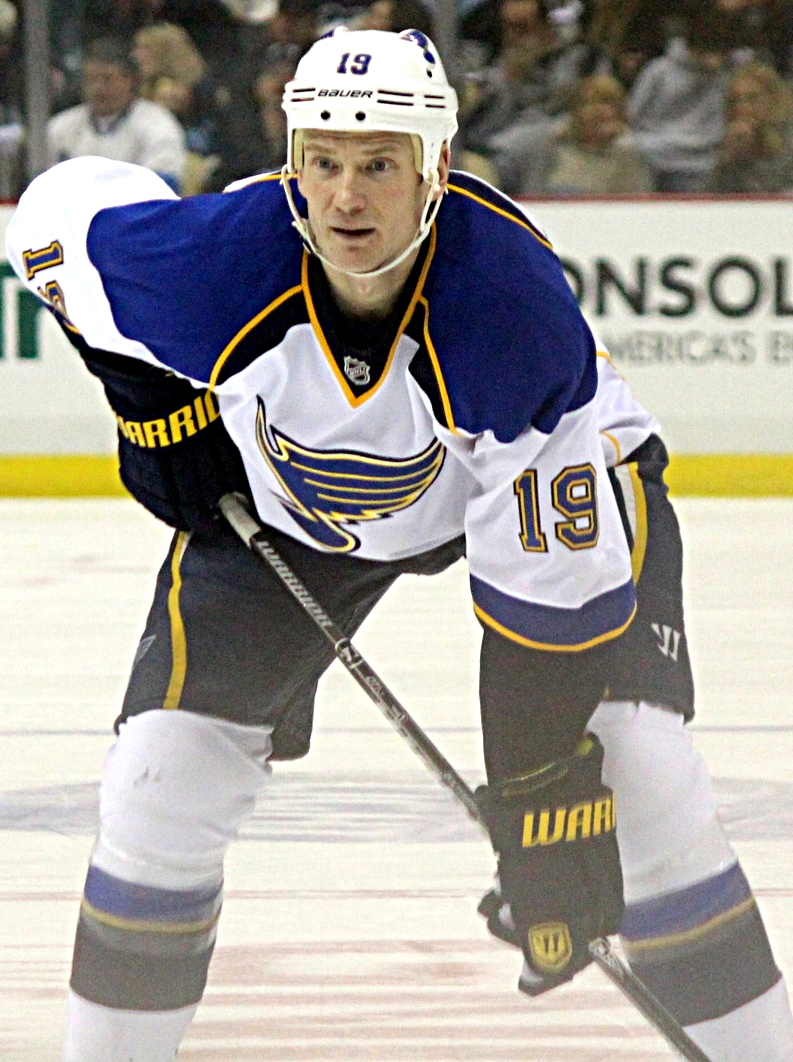
- Bouwmeester with the St. Louis Blues in March 2014
- Born: September 27, 1983 (age 42) Edmonton, Alberta, Canada
- Height: 6 ft 4 in (193 cm)
- Weight: 215 lb (98 kg; 15 st 5 lb)
- Position: Defence
- Shot: Left
- Played for: Florida Panthers; Calgary Flames; St. Louis Blues
- National team: Canada
- NHL draft: 3rd overall, 2002; Florida Panthers
- Playing career: 2002–2020

Jay Daniel Bouwmeester (born September 27, 1983) is a Canadian former professional ice hockey player. A defenceman, he played seventeen seasons in the National Hockey League (NHL) for the Florida Panthers, Calgary Flames and St. Louis Blues. He was a first round selection, third overall, of the Panthers at the 2002 NHL entry draft. He was named to the NHL All-Rookie Team in 2003 and played seven seasons in the Panthers organization before being traded to the Calgary Flames in 2009, with which he played four seasons. Bouwmeester was then traded to the Blues in 2013. He held one of the longest iron man streaks in NHL history as he appeared in 737 consecutive regular season games between 2004 and 2014.

He played in the 2007 and 2009 NHL All-Star Games. Bouwmeester won the Stanley Cup as a member of the Blues in 2019, becoming the twenty-ninth member of the Triple Gold Club.

Internationally, Bouwmeester has represented Canada numerous times. He appeared in three consecutive World Junior Championships between 2000 and 2002, winning a silver and two bronze medals. He made his debut with the senior national team in 2003, winning the first of two consecutive World Championship titles. Bouwmeester was a member of the 2004 World Cup of Hockey championship team and won a gold medal with Canada at the 2014 Winter Olympics.

== Early life ==
Bouwmeester was born September 27, 1983, in Edmonton, Alberta. He is the son of Dan and Gena Bouwmeester, and has an older sister, Jill. His father is a school teacher and coach in Edmonton, and played defence for the University of Alberta Golden Bears hockey team. Bouwmeester was a naturally gifted player; his father said he could handle a hockey stick at an early age, and learned to skate shortly after he learned to walk. An all-around athlete, Bouwmeester also played baseball and soccer competitively, and ran track, played volleyball and basketball at school. However, he had natural talent for hockey and learned to play on a backyard hockey rink his father maintained and in the basement of the family home. As a youth, he played in the 1996 Quebec International Pee-Wee Hockey Tournament with a minor ice hockey team from Edmonton.

== Playing career ==
=== Junior ===
Bouwmeester played bantam and midget hockey with the Edmonton South Side Athletic Club, winning the Alberta midget championship in 1997–98. He was selected by the Medicine Hat Tigers first overall at the Western Hockey League's (WHL) 1998 Bantam Draft, and appeared in eight games with the Tigers in the 1998–99 WHL season.

He joined the Tigers full-time in 1999–2000, scoring 34 points in 64 games as a 16-year-old. His offensive totals improved in his next two WHL seasons: 53 in 2000–01 and 61 in 2001–02. He was named to the WHL's East All-Star team, and was considered a candidate to be selected first overall at the 2002 NHL entry draft. Instead, he was taken third overall by the Florida Panthers, behind Rick Nash and Kari Lehtonen.

=== Florida Panthers ===
Bouwmeester made his NHL debut with the Panthers at the start of the 2002–03 Season, and appeared in all 82 games for Florida, a franchise rookie record. He scored his first NHL goal on November 11, 2002, against the Chicago Blackhawks, and finished the season with 4 goals and 16 points. He was named to the 2003 NHL All-Rookie Team on defence.

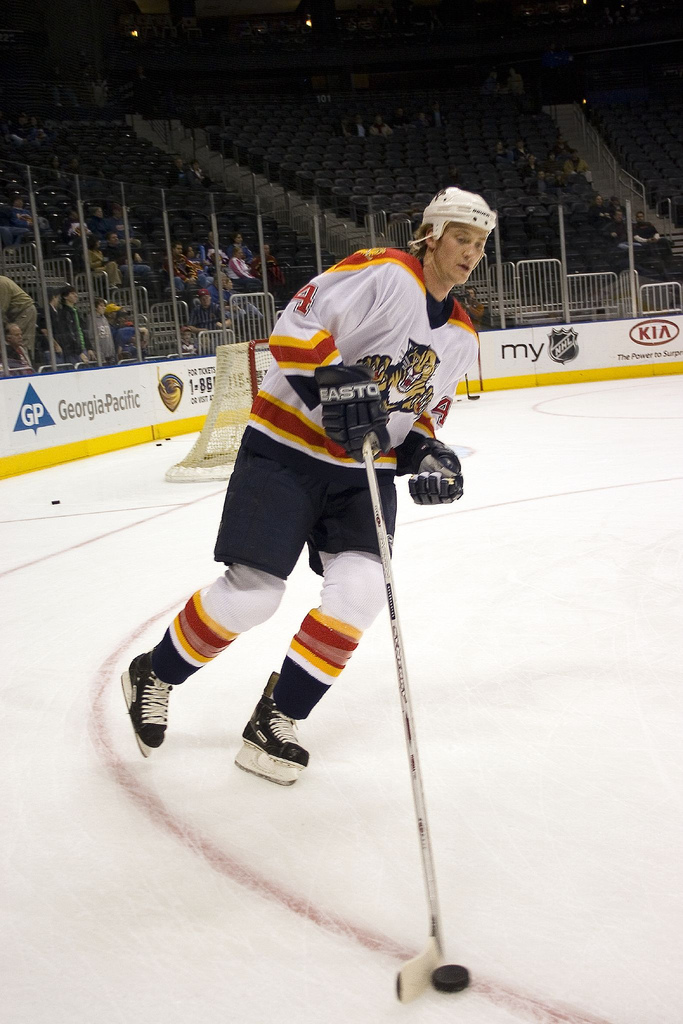
Bouwmeester with the Florida Panthers in 2005

He improved to 20 points in 61 games in 2003–04, though he missed 18 games with a foot injury. The 2004–05 NHL lockout forced him to play in the American Hockey League (AHL) that season. He joined the Panthers' AHL affiliate, the San Antonio Rampage, but experienced difficulties adapting to playing in the minor leagues. Despite struggling to generate offence, Bouwmeester participated in the AHL All-Star Game, and was loaned to the Chicago Wolves when it became evident the Rampage would not qualify for the playoffs. Bouwmeester and the Wolves reached the Calder Cup Finals, where they lost to the Philadelphia Phantoms.

Bouwmeester experienced a break-out season after the NHL resumed play in 2005–06, scoring 5 goals, 41 assists and 46 points in 82 games, all career highs, and was invited to join Team Canada at the 2006 Winter Olympics in place of injured defenceman Scott Niedermayer. He made news that off-season in his hometown of Edmonton when he was arrested for driving under the influence, a charge he pleaded guilty to the following summer.

Bouwmeester again appeared in all 82 games for the Panthers in 2006–07 and set a new career high with 12 goals. He appeared in his first NHL All-Star Game, representing the Panthers in the game held in Dallas, Texas.

Bouwmeester improved again to 15 goals in 2007–08 while again playing in every game for the Panthers, and led the NHL in average ice time at 27:28 minutes per game. He signed a new one-year, $4.875 million contract as a restricted free agent following the season, turning down the Panthers' long-term offers in the hopes of becoming an unrestricted free agent at the expiry of his new contract.

Another 15-goal season followed in 2008–09. He played in all 82 games and succeeded Andrew Brunette as the NHL's ironman when the latter player was forced out of the Minnesota Wild line-up with injury. He appeared in his second All-Star Game, scoring a goal. As the season approached its end, the Panthers were fighting for the final playoff spot in the Eastern Conference but were unable to convince Bouwmeester to sign a contract extension. Despite numerous offers from other teams for his services, Florida general manager Jacques Martin chose not to trade Bouwmeester. He and the Panthers struggled to end the season and failed to qualify for the playoffs.

=== Calgary Flames ===
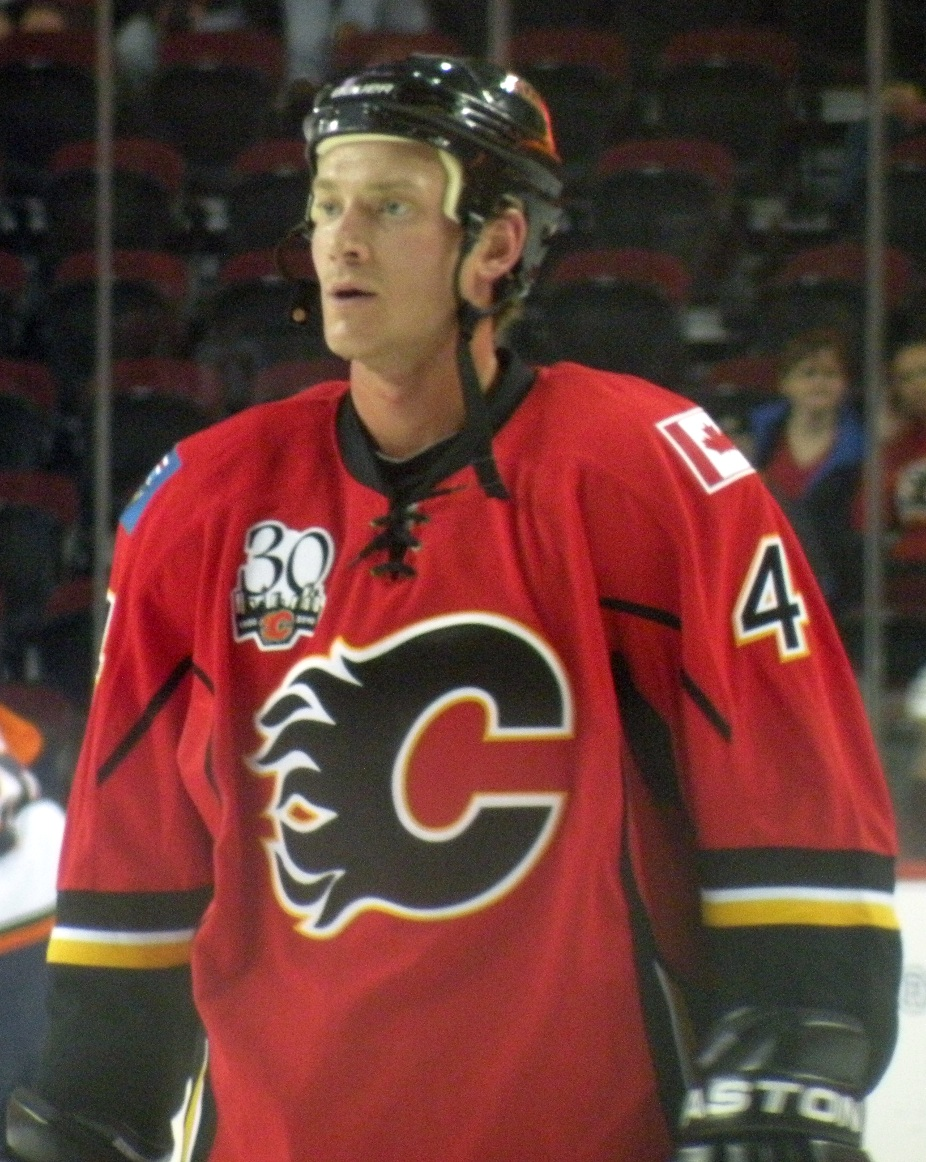
Bouwmeester played for the Flames for three and a half seasons.

Unable to come to terms with Bouwmeester, the Panthers traded his negotiating rights to the Calgary Flames in exchange for the negotiating rights to defenceman Jordan Leopold and a third-round draft pick (used to select Josh Birkholz) in the 2009 NHL entry draft. The trade gave the Flames four days with which they had exclusive rights to negotiate with Bouwmeester before he became an unrestricted free agent and gained the ability to negotiate with any team. Hours before that deadline expired, Bouwmeester and the Flames agreed to a five-year, $33 million contract.

The Flames struggled to score for much of the 2009–10 NHL season, and Bouwmeester was no exception—he finished the year with just three goals and rarely served as an offensive catalyst for Calgary. However, he did not miss a game for the Flames and while his consecutive games played streak sat at 424 following the season, Bouwmeester also held the active record for most games played without reaching the Stanley Cup playoffs, at 553. He continued to score at a rate below his time in Florida, recording 24 points in 2010–11 and 29 in 2011–12. He led the team in ice time both years, averaging nearly 26 minutes per game. Bouwmeester broke the NHL record for consecutive games played by a defenceman on March 15, 2011, when he appeared in his 486th consecutive game, surpassing Kārlis Skrastiņš.

=== St. Louis Blues ===
Calgary failed to reach the playoffs in both seasons, and while Bouwmeester's offensive production increased in the lockout-shortened 2012–13 season—he had 6 goals and 15 points in 33 games for Calgary and again led the team in ice time—he also reached 750 career games without appearing in the playoffs. With the Flames entering a rebuilding phase, Bouwmeester agreed to waive his no-trade clause and accepted a trade on April 1, 2013. He was traded to the St. Louis Blues in exchange for prospects Mark Cundari, Reto Berra and a first-round draft pick in 2013. He described leaving Calgary as "bittersweet", calling the city a great place to play, but expressed hope he would finally reach the playoffs with the Blues. He achieved this goal after the Blues clinched a playoff spot in their third-last game of the season, and the 762nd of Bouwmeester's career. In so doing, he avoided breaking Olli Jokinen's NHL record of 799 career games before making his playoff debut (Jokinen was surpassed by Ron Hainsey two years later).

The Blues and Bouwmeester agreed to a five-year, $27 million contract extension prior to the 2013–14 season. He recorded 37 points for the Blues during the season, his highest total since 2008–09 with the Panthers. Bouwmeester's iron man streak ended early in the 2014–15 season after he missed the Blues' November 23, 2014, contest against the Winnipeg Jets. He suffered a "lower body injury" after skating into a rut in the ice in the previous game against the Ottawa Senators. The streak ended at 737 consecutive games, the fifth-longest in NHL history at that date.

After 1,112 career games, Bouwmeester was made a healthy scratch for the first time on October 20, 2018, a 4–1 win against the Toronto Maple Leafs. Bouwmeester returned to the lineup the next game. Bouwmeester and the Blues struggled during the first half of the season, ultimately replacing head coach Mike Yeo with Craig Berube, but had a late-season turnaround and ultimately clinched a playoff berth on March 29, 2019. On April 8, 2019, the Blues re-signed Bouwmeester (a pending unrestricted free agent) to a one-year, $3.25 million contract extension. The Blues late-season turnaround culminated with a victory in the 2019 Stanley Cup Final, the first in the St. Louis Blues' 52-year history. Bouwmeester recorded seven assists in 26 playoff games while averaging nearly 25 minutes of ice time per game. Now having won the Stanley Cup, Bouwmeester became the twenty-ninth member of the Triple Gold Club, having won two gold medals in World Championships and an Olympic gold medal previously.

==== In-game cardiac arrest and retirement ====
On February 11, 2020, during the first period of a game versus the Anaheim Ducks at the Honda Center in Anaheim, Bouwmeester went into cardiac arrest and collapsed on the bench during a television time out following a long shift with the score tied 1–1 at the time. The remainder of the game (which was a 4–2 win for St. Louis) was played on March 11. On February 14, 2020, Bouwmeester had an implantable cardioverter defibrillator (ICD) procedure to restore his heart's normal rhythm.

Similar incidents have been seen in the NHL in the 21st century. Jiří Fischer of the Detroit Red Wings suffered a cardiac arrest on the bench during a game in November 2005, and Rich Peverley, at the time a member of the Dallas Stars, also suffered a cardiac arrest on the bench during a game in March 2014. In November 2016, Craig Cunningham collapsed from cardiac arrest during a pre-game skate while playing for the Arizona Coyotes' AHL affiliate, the Tucson Roadrunners. All three players survived the incidents.

Bouwmeester officially announced his retirement from hockey on January 11, 2021, exactly 11 months after his cardiac arrest incident.

== International play ==
Medal record

Representing Canada

Ice hockey

Winter Olympics
Gold medal – first place	2014 Sochi	

World Championships
Gold medal – first place	2003 Finland	
Gold medal – first place	2004 Czech Republic	
Silver medal – second place	2008 Canada	

Canada Cup / World Cup
Gold medal – first place	2004 Toronto (final)	
Gold medal – first place	2016 Toronto	

World Junior Championships
Silver medal – second place	2002 Czech Republic	
Bronze medal – third place	2000 Sweden	
Bronze medal – third place	2001 Russia	

Bouwmeester played in three World Junior Championships with the Canadian junior team. He became the youngest player to ever represent Canada at the tournament when he won a bronze medal at the 2000 tournament at the age of 16 years, 3 months. He recorded two assists in 2001 as Canada won another bronze medal. In 2002, Bouwmeester and the Canadian team won the silver medal, losing the championship game to Russia, 5–4.

Bouwmeester's first appearance with the senior team came at the 2003 World Championships. He finished second in scoring amongst defencemen with seven points, and was named the tournament's best defenceman and an all-star as he helped Canada win the gold medal. Bouwmeester won a second gold medal at the 2004 World Championship, contributing three points in nine games. He scored the championship winning goal in a 5–3 victory over Sweden. He was a late addition to Canada's entry at the 2004 World Cup of Hockey, invited to replace the injured Chris Pronger. He appeared in four games as Canada won the tournament.

Bouwmeester again joined the team as an injury replacement at the 2006 Winter Olympics after Scott Niedermayer was forced out of the tournament. He appeared in six games, scoring no points, as Canada lost in the quarter-finals. Bouwmeester appeared again with the national team at the 2008 World Championship. He played in all nine games, settling for the silver medal after Russia defeated Canada in the final.

Bouwmeester participated in Canada's summer camp in advance of the 2010 Winter Olympics, but his struggles in the weeks leading up the team being announced resulted in his being left off the final roster. However, he was selected as a reserve by Team Canada for the 2010 Winter Olympics should an injury occur during the tournament. Bouwmeester played in all six of Canada's games at the 2014 Winter Olympics, contributing one assist and winning the gold medal.

== Playing style ==
Bouwmeester is best known for his skating ability. His coach with the Medicine Hat Tigers, Rick Carriere, said his ability to move the puck up the ice and score meant Bouwmeester could have played in the NHL at the age of 15. He is a capable offensive player from his defensive position and frequently joined offensive rushes while with Florida, but failed to do so as often in his first season in Calgary, resulting in much lower offensive output. In his later seasons with St. Louis, Bouwmeester was used mostly as a stay-at-home defenseman and recorded less offensive output. One criticism of Bouwmeester’s game is his lack of physicality despite his size. Commentator Ken Campbell argued it has prevented him from becoming one of the game's elite defencemen. During the 2008-09 season, Bouwmeester registered 69 hits, which ranked last among defensemen who logged more than 25 minutes of ice-time per game. He is frequently among the NHL leaders in ice time per game and one of the most durable.

== Personal life ==
Bouwmeester resides with his family in Canmore, Alberta.

== Career statistics ==
=== Regular season and playoffs ===
			Regular season					Playoffs
Season	Team	League	GP	G	A	Pts	PIM	GP	G	A	Pts	PIM
1998–99	Medicine Hat Tigers	WHL	8	2	1	3	2	—	—	—	—	—
1999–00	Medicine Hat Tigers	WHL	64	13	21	34	26	—	—	—	—	—
2000–01	Medicine Hat Tigers	WHL	61	14	39	53	44	—	—	—	—	—
2001–02	Medicine Hat Tigers	WHL	61	11	50	61	42	—	—	—	—	—
2002–03	Florida Panthers	NHL	82	4	12	16	14	—	—	—	—	—
2003–04	San Antonio Rampage	AHL	2	0	1	1	2	—	—	—	—	—
2003–04	Florida Panthers	NHL	61	2	18	20	30	—	—	—	—	—
2004–05	San Antonio Rampage	AHL	64	4	13	17	50	—	—	—	—	—
2004–05	Chicago Wolves	AHL	18	6	3	9	12	18	0	0	0	14
2005–06	Florida Panthers	NHL	82	5	41	46	79	—	—	—	—	—
2006–07	Florida Panthers	NHL	82	12	30	42	66	—	—	—	—	—
2007–08	Florida Panthers	NHL	82	15	22	37	72	—	—	—	—	—
2008–09	Florida Panthers	NHL	82	15	27	42	68	—	—	—	—	—
2009–10	Calgary Flames	NHL	82	3	26	29	48	—	—	—	—	—
2010–11	Calgary Flames	NHL	82	4	20	24	44	—	—	—	—	—
2011–12	Calgary Flames	NHL	82	5	24	29	26	—	—	—	—	—
2012–13	Calgary Flames	NHL	33	6	9	15	16	—	—	—	—	—
2012–13	St. Louis Blues	NHL	14	1	6	7	6	6	0	1	1	0
2013–14	St. Louis Blues	NHL	82	4	33	37	20	6	0	1	1	2
2014–15	St. Louis Blues	NHL	72	2	11	13	24	6	0	0	0	2
2015–16	St. Louis Blues	NHL	72	3	16	19	18	20	0	4	4	24
2016–17	St. Louis Blues	NHL	81	1	14	15	28	11	0	0	0	4
2017–18	St. Louis Blues	NHL	35	2	5	7	16	—	—	—	—	—
2018–19	St. Louis Blues	NHL	78	3	14	17	40	26	0	7	7	18
2019–20	St. Louis Blues	NHL	56	1	8	9	20	—	—	—	—	—
NHL totals			1,240	88	336	424	635	75	0	13	13	50

=== International ===
Year	Team	Event	Result	GP	G	A	Pts	PIM
2000	Canada	WJC	3rd place, bronze medalist(s)	7	0	0	0	2
2001	Canada	WJC	3rd place, bronze medalist(s)	7	0	2	2	6
2002	Canada	WJC	2nd place, silver medalist(s)	7	0	2	2	10
2003	Canada	WC	1st place, gold medalist(s)	9	3	4	7	4
2004	Canada	WC	1st place, gold medalist(s)	9	2	1	3	0
2004	Canada	WCH	1st place, gold medalist(s)	4	0	0	0	0
2006	Canada	OG	7th	6	0	0	0	0
2008	Canada	WC	2nd place, silver medalist(s)	9	0	0	0	4
2012	Canada	WC	5th	8	0	2	2	0
2014	Canada	OG	1st place, gold medalist(s)	6	0	1	1	0
2016	Canada	WCH	1st place, gold medalist(s)	6	0	1	1	4
Junior totals				21	0	4	4	18
Senior totals				57	5	9	14	12

=== All-Star Games ===
Year	Location	G	A	P	PIM
2007	Dallas	0	1	1	0
2009	Montreal	1	2	3	0
All-Star totals		1	3	4	0

== Awards and honours ==
Award	Year
Junior
CHL/NHL Top Prospects Game	2002
WHL Eastern Conference First All-Star Team	2002
National Hockey League
All-Rookie Team	2002–03
NHL All-Star	2007, 2009
Stanley Cup champion	2019
International
Best Defenceman	2003
WC All-Star Team	2003

Awards and achievements
Preceded by Lukas Krajicek	Florida Panthers first-round draft pick 2002	Succeeded by Petr Taticek
