= Justin Kelly =

Justin Kelly may refer to:

- Justin Kelly (actor), Canadian actor
- Justin Kelly (director), film director
- Justin Kelly (ice hockey), professional ice hockey player
- Justin Kelly (police officer), head of the Irish police and security service
