= Billy Moores =

Canadian ice hockey executive and coach

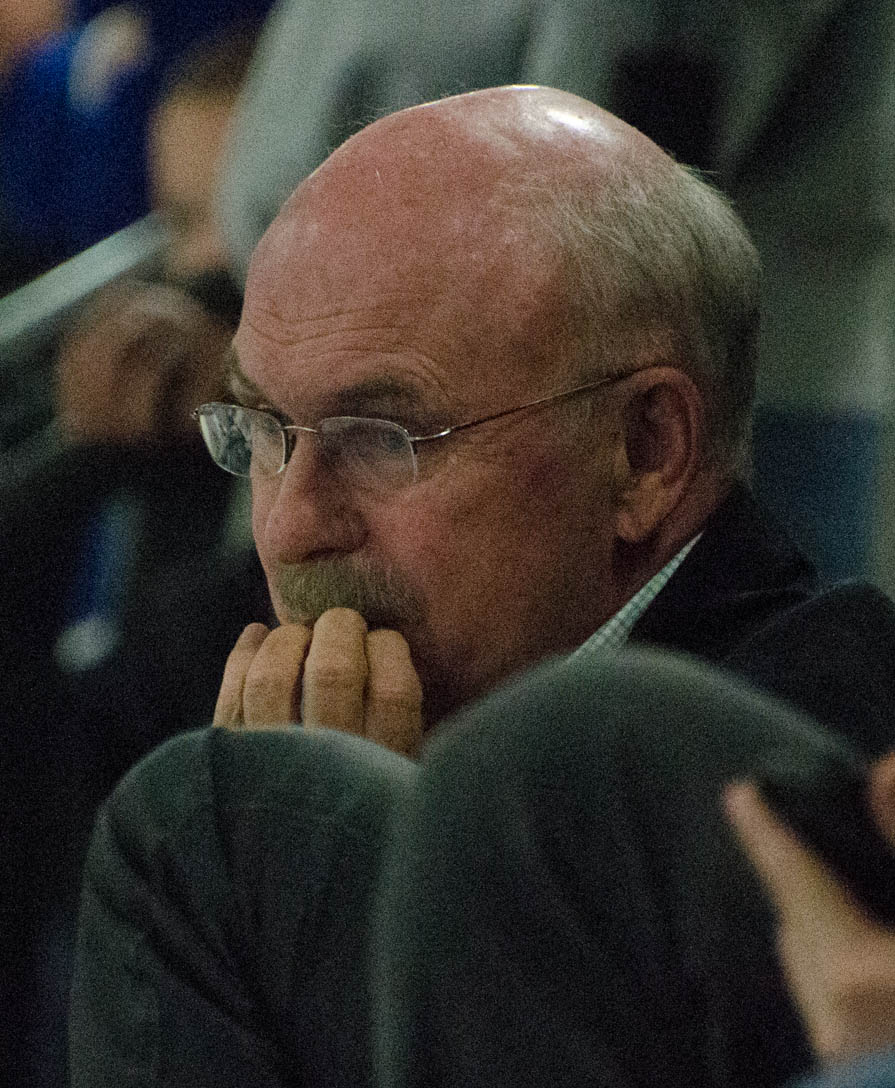
- Moores in 2014 at the Edmonton Oilers training camp
- Born: April 1, 1948 (age 78); Edmonton, Alberta, Canada
- Education: University of Alberta
- Occupations: Consultant to Player Development, Edmonton Oilers
- Known for: Former National Hockey League assistant coach, former coach of the Alberta Golden Bears men's ice hockey team
- Spouse: Connie Moores

Billy Moores (born April 1, 1948) is a Canadian ice hockey executive, scout, and former assistant coach in the National Hockey League and in Canadian University athletics. He also played minor hockey for the Edmonton Oil Kings in the late 1960s, playing the position of left wing. He was named the Director of Coaching Development and Special Projects for the Edmonton Oilers on July 30, 2013, re-joining the organization after first being associated with them in 2000.

== Playing career ==
Moores played on the junior Edmonton Oil Kings from 1966 to 1967 and 1969 to 1970, the latter season finishing with 29 goals and 35 assists. He also played on the Alberta Golden Bears men's hockey team for the 1971–72 season, as a left winger. From 1972 to 1973, Moores also played with the Long Island Ducks of the Eastern Hockey League. He retired from his playing career in 1973.

== Coaching career ==
=== Alberta Golden Bears ===
Moores began his coaching career coaching minor hockey in Edmonton in the 1970s. He later returned to the University of Alberta, with his former team, the Golden Bears, serving in the capacity as head coach and assistant coach (under Clare Drake) between the 1976–77 season to the 1993–94 season. During his career coaching the Golden Bears, Moores accumulated a record of 129 wins, 44 losses, and 23 ties. Moores won much recognition for his time at the University of Alberta, being named Coach of the Year for the Canada West Conference in 1984, 1990, 1991, and 1993, and also Coach of the Year for the Canadian Interuniversity Athletics Union in 1980 and 1991. He led the team to two championship victories in 1980 and 1992. During his time with coaching the Golden Bears, Moores also taught junior high school in Edmonton.

==== Statistics ====
As head coach:

Year	Team	W	L	OT/T
1979–80	Alberta Golden Bears	29	13	0
1983–84	Alberta Golden Bears	36	8	11
1989–90	Alberta Golden Bears	35	13	2
1990–91	Alberta Golden Bears	34	10	3
1991–92	Alberta Golden Bears	32	10	5
1992–93	Alberta Golden Bears	30	12	5
1990–91	Alberta Golden Bears	23	12	7

=== Regina Pats ===
Taking a leave of absence from the Golden Bears, Moores also served as the coach-general manager of the Western Hockey League's Regina Pats in the 1985–86 season, compiling a record of 45–26–1. He resigned on May 8, 1986, to pursue a higher-level coaching job, in the National Hockey League, rejecting offers from other junior teams and from the University of British Columbia Thunderbirds to coach.

=== Japan ===
In 1994, Moores took up a position in Japan coaching the Kokudo Bunnies, in which he served until 1996. During his time in Japan, his team won the championship in 1996, compiling a 22–7–1 record in the preceding season.

Moores would also serve as an assistant coach and consultant for the Japanese National Team in the 2000 IIHF World Championship in Russia.

=== National Hockey League ===
Moores had previously garnered attention from National Hockey League teams when the Edmonton Oilers sought his services as an assistant coach in 1980, to which he declined. In 1986, Moores had also attempted to pursue employment as a coach in the NHL, potentially fielding an offer by the Vancouver Canucks, but ultimately not receiving the job.

In 1996, Moores was hired as an assistant coach for the NHL's New York Rangers, under head coach Colin Campbell. It was then where Moores met Craig MacTavish, another fellow assistant on the Rangers coaching staff who would later hire Moores as an assistant as head coach of the Edmonton Oilers.

Moores was hired by the Edmonton Oilers in June 2000, under head coach Craig MacTavish. He served as assistant coach for the Oilers until the 2008–09 season. During his time with the Oilers, he was a part of the coaching staff that led the team to the 2006 Stanley Cup Finals, which the Oilers would go on to drop the championship to the Carolina Hurricanes in game 7 of the championship series.

In 2010, Moores was named to Craig MacTavish's coaching staff again, as an assistant to the Canadian National Team in the 2010 IIHF World Championship in Germany. Canada was eliminated in the quarterfinal round of the tournament, dropping a 5-2 decision to Russia.

Moores, who resides in Edmonton, is currently the Director of Coaching Development and Special Projects with the Edmonton Oilers. He has previously been a pro scout and Senior Coordinator of Player Development for the Oilers, being named to the latter position in July 2010. He retired from the position on June 28, 2012, and was succeeded by Rick Carriere, former general manager of the WHL's Medicine Hat Tigers. He continued to serve as a consultant to player development for the Oilers before his July 30, 2013 appointment as Director of Coaching Development and Special Projects. He will work with the coaching staffs of the Edmonton Oilers, their AHL affiliate Oklahoma City Barons, and the Edmonton-based and Oilers-owned WHL team, the Edmonton Oil Kings.
