= Nathan Barrett (ice hockey) =

Canadian ice hockey player (born 1981)

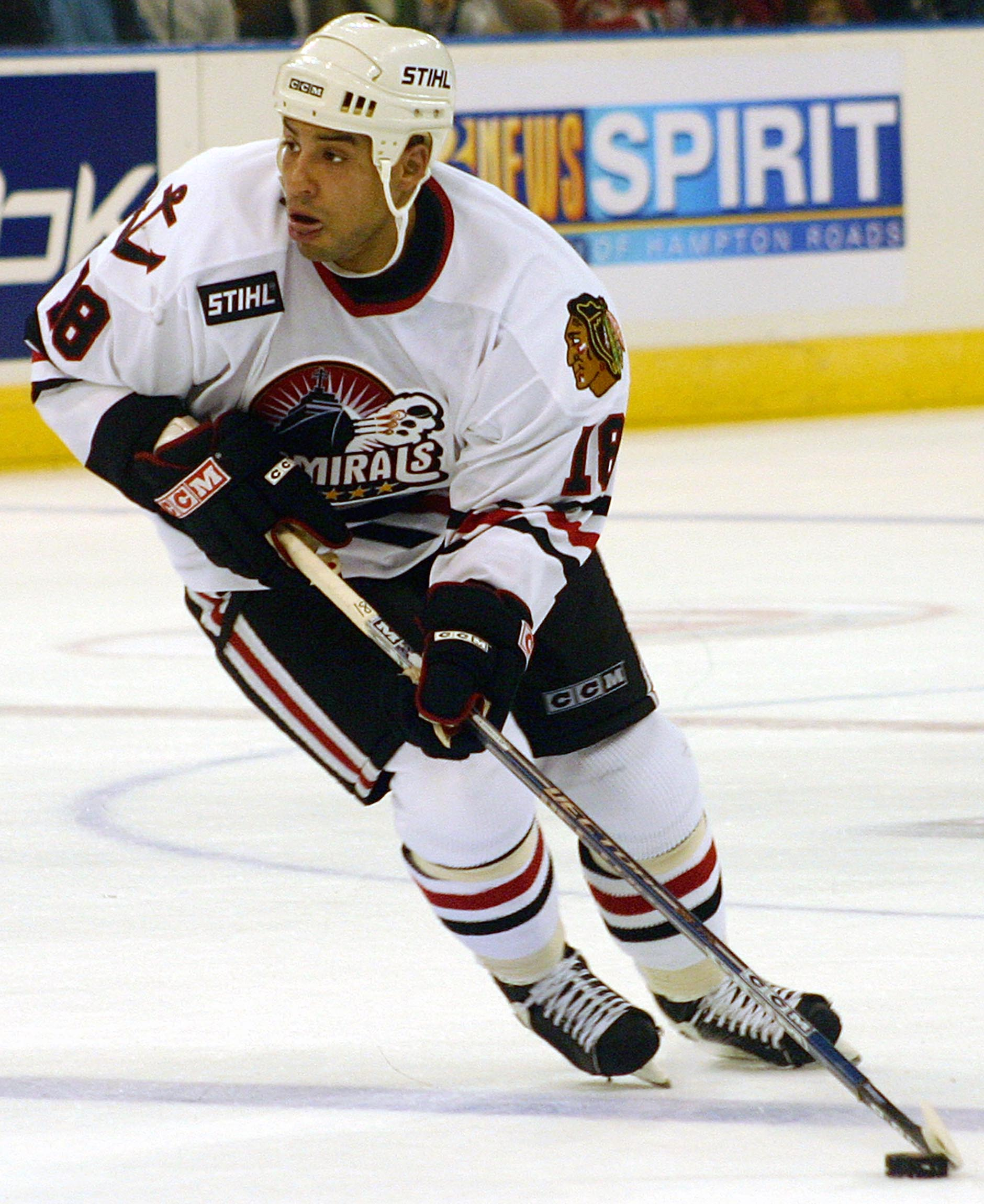
- Barrett with the Norfolk Admirals in 2005
- Born: August 3, 1981 (age 44) Vancouver, British Columbia, Canada
- Height: 5 ft 10 in (178 cm)
- Weight: 187 lb (85 kg; 13 st 5 lb)
- Position: Centre
- Shot: Left
- Played for: AHL; St. John's Maple Leafs; Norfolk Admirals; ECHL; Victoria Salmon Kings; Las Vegas Wranglers; Wheeling Nailers; Europe; Straubing Tigers; HC TPS; EHC Visp
- NHL draft: 241st overall, 2000; Vancouver Canucks
- Playing career: 2002–2009

Nathan Barrett (born August 3, 1981) is a Canadian former professional ice hockey centre. Barrett was selected by the Vancouver Canucks in the 8th round (241st overall) of the 2000 NHL entry draft.

Between 2002 and 2006, Barrett played 257 games in the American Hockey League (AHL) with the St. John's Maple Leafs and Norfolk Admirals.

== Career statistics ==
			Regular season					Playoffs
Season	Team	League	GP	G	A	Pts	PIM	GP	G	A	Pts	PIM
1997–98	Tri–City Americans	WHL	47	1	1	2	23	—	—	—	—	—
1998–99	Tri–City Americans	WHL	33	9	9	18	19	—	—	—	—	—
1998–99	Lethbridge Hurricanes	WHL	22	12	9	21	17	4	1	0	1	0
1999–2000	Lethbridge Hurricanes	WHL	72	44	38	82	38	—	—	—	—	—
2000–01	Lethbridge Hurricanes	WHL	70	46	53	99	66	5	1	1	2	6
2001–02	Lethbridge Hurricanes	WHL	72	45	62	107	100	4	0	1	1	6
2002–03	St. John's Maple Leafs	AHL	69	9	22	31	35	—	—	—	—	—
2003–04	St. John's Maple Leafs	AHL	49	17	21	38	41	—	—	—	—	—
2004–05	St. John's Maple Leafs	AHL	61	17	22	39	34	3	0	1	1	0
2005–06	Norfolk Admirals	AHL	78	30	31	61	68	4	1	2	3	4
2006–07	Straubing Tigers	DEL	18	5	5	10	20	—	—	—	—	—
2006–07	TPS	SM-liiga	16	7	5	12	12	1	0	0	0	2
2007–08	EHC Visp	SUI.2	3	4	3	7	2	—	—	—	—	—
2007–08	Victoria Salmon Kings	ECHL	13	3	10	13	4	—	—	—	—	—
2007–08	Las Vegas Wranglers	ECHL	7	4	2	6	10	—	—	—	—	—
2008–09	Wheeling Nailers	ECHL	1	0	0	0	0	—	—	—	—	—
AHL totals			257	73	96	169	178	7	1	3	4	4

== Awards and honors ==
Award	Year
WHL
East Second Team All-Star	2001
East First All-Star Team	2002
