= Reese Johnson =

Canadian ice hockey player (born 1998)

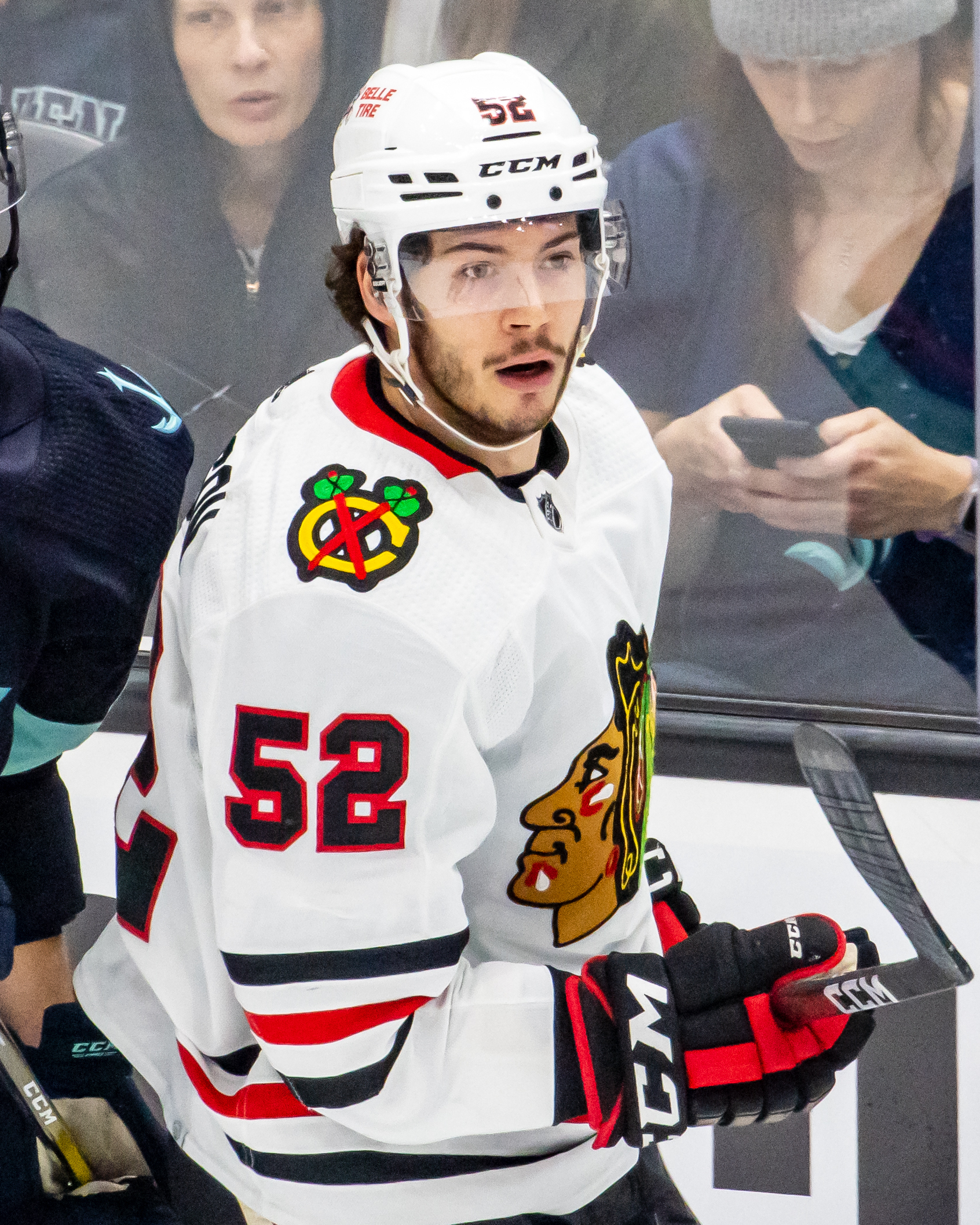
- Johnson with the Chicago Blackhawks in 2023
- Born: July 10, 1998 (age 28) Saskatoon, Saskatchewan, Canada
- Height: 6 ft 1 in (185 cm)
- Weight: 193 lb (88 kg; 13 st 11 lb)
- Position: Forward
- Shoots: Right
- AHL team Former teams: Toronto Marlies; Chicago Blackhawks; Minnesota Wild
- NHL draft: Undrafted
- Playing career: 2019–present

Reese Johnson (born July 10, 1998) is a Canadian professional ice hockey forward for the Toronto Marlies of the American Hockey League (AHL).

== Playing career ==
Johnson played as a youth with the Saskatoon Blazers of the Saskatchewan Male U18 AAA Hockey League (SMAAAHL), before he was signed by major junior club, the Red Deer Rebels of the Western Hockey League (WHL).

Johnson played in five seasons with the Rebels, captaining the club during his final season in 2018–19 and compiling a career high 27 goals and 53 points through 67 regular season games. As an undrafted free agent, Johnson was signed by the Chicago Blackhawks to a three-year, entry-level contract on March 6, 2019. Following a first-round exit with the Rebels to complete his junior career, Johnson embarked on his professional career by joining the Blackhawks AHL affiliate, the Rockford IceHogs, for the final stages of the 2018–19 season, posting four assists through six games.

In the pandemic-delayed 2020–21 season, after attending the Blackhawks training camp, Johnson was originally assigned to Rockford's training camp. On January 21, 2021, he was added to Chicago's Taxi squad, and through a growing list of players ruled out through the COVID protocol, Johnson was called up to make his NHL debut with the Blackhawks against the Columbus Blue Jackets on January 31, 2021. He recorded his first career NHL goal on November 23 in a 5–2 loss to the Calgary Flames.

After six seasons within the Blackhawks organization, Johnson left as a free agent and was signed to a one-year, two-way contract with the Minnesota Wild on July 1, 2024.

After only appearing in three games for the Wild in the 2024–25 season, Johnson was traded to the Toronto Maple Leafs in exchange for future considerations. He was assigned to continue in the AHL with affiliate the Toronto Marlies.

== Career statistics ==
			Regular season					Playoffs
Season	Team	League	GP	G	A	Pts	PIM	GP	G	A	Pts	PIM
2013–14	Saskatoon Blazers	SMAAAHL	39	8	5	13	30	—	—	—	—	—
2014–15	Saskatoon Blazers	SMAAAHL	43	23	15	38	68	—	—	—	—	—
2014–15	Red Deer Rebels	WHL	12	2	0	2	11	3	0	0	0	0
2015–16	Red Deer Rebels	WHL	36	3	3	6	31	—	—	—	—	—
2016–17	Red Deer Rebels	WHL	—	—	—	—	—	3	0	0	0	0
2017–18	Red Deer Rebels	WHL	72	23	16	39	42	5	2	4	6	7
2018–19	Red Deer Rebels	WHL	67	27	26	53	71	4	1	1	2	0
2018–19	Rockford IceHogs	AHL	6	0	4	4	2	—	—	—	—	—
2019–20	Rockford IceHogs	AHL	52	4	4	8	63	—	—	—	—	—
2020–21	Chicago Blackhawks	NHL	5	0	0	0	9	—	—	—	—	—
2020–21	Rockford IceHogs	AHL	18	4	4	8	40	—	—	—	—	—
2021–22	Rockford IceHogs	AHL	7	1	2	3	0	—	—	—	—	—
2021–22	Chicago Blackhawks	NHL	37	1	5	6	16	—	—	—	—	—
2022–23	Chicago Blackhawks	NHL	57	4	2	6	38	—	—	—	—	—
2023–24	Chicago Blackhawks	NHL	42	2	3	5	40	—	—	—	—	—
2024–25	Iowa Wild	AHL	49	4	9	13	35	—	—	—	—	—
2024–25	Minnesota Wild	NHL	3	0	0	0	0	—	—	—	—	—
2024–25	Toronto Marlies	AHL	6	0	1	1	9	2	0	0	0	4
2025–26	Toronto Marlies	AHL	47	6	9	15	39	15	1	0	1	20
NHL totals			144	7	10	17	103	—	—	—	—	—

== Awards and honours ==
Award	Year
AHL
Calder Cup champion	2026
