= Mikhail Yakubov =

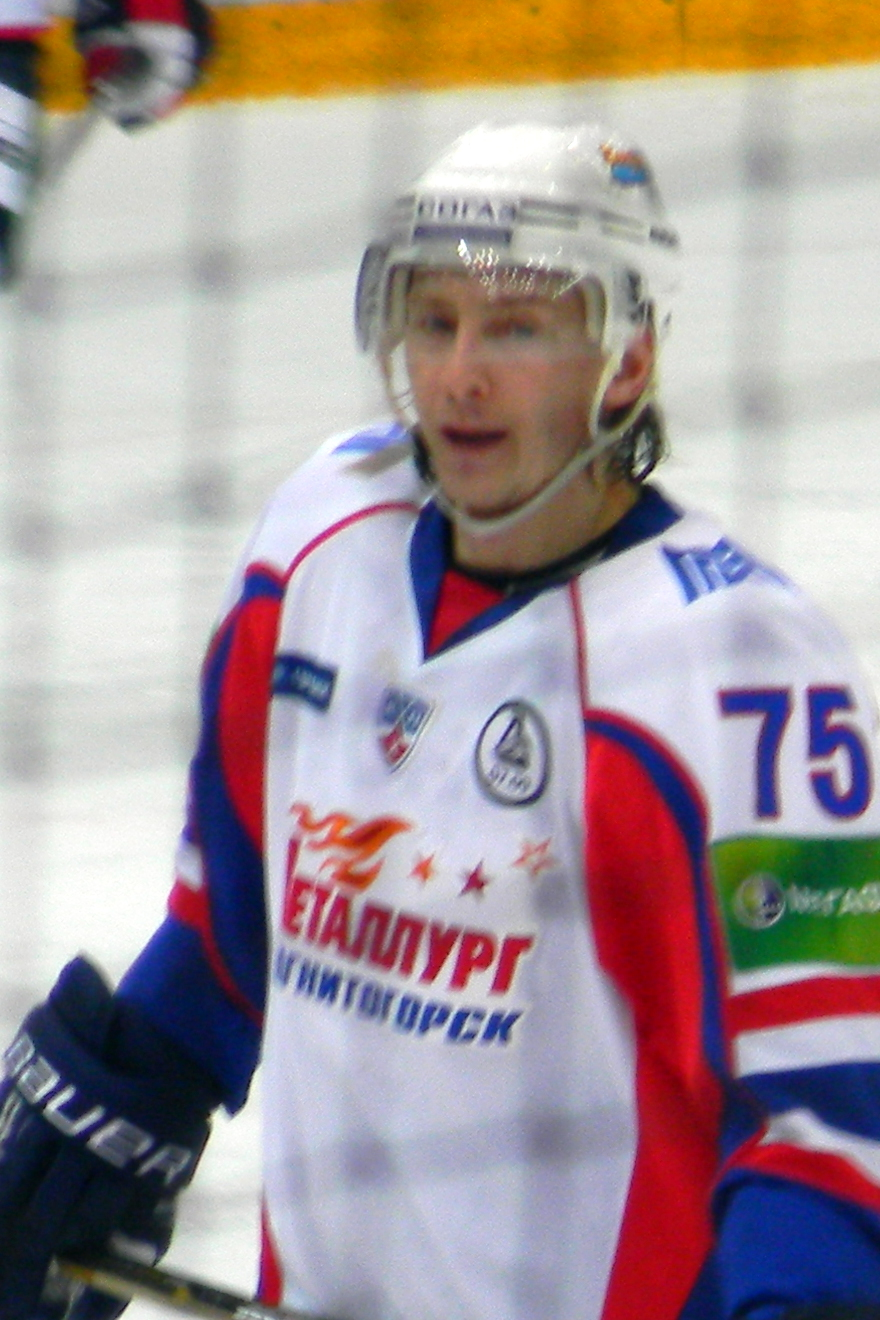
- Born: February 16, 1982 (age 44) Barnaul, Soviet Union
- Height: 6 ft 3 in (191 cm)
- Weight: 202 lb (92 kg; 14 st 6 lb)
- Position: Centre
- Shot: Left
- Played for: HC Lada Togliatti; Chicago Blackhawks; HC Spartak Moscow; Florida Panthers; HC Severstal Cherepovets; Yugra Khanty-Mansiysk; Metallurg Magnitogorsk; HC Vityaz; HC Sochi
- NHL draft: 10th overall, 2000; Chicago Blackhawks
- Playing career: 2000–2016

Mikhail Yurievich Yakubov (born February 16, 1982) is a Russian former professional ice hockey center who is currently an assistant coach for the Chicago Cougars of the United States Premier Hockey League. He last played with HC Sochi of the Kontinental Hockey League (KHL). Yakubov was drafted 10th overall by the Chicago Blackhawks in the 2000 NHL entry draft.

In 2006, he won Pajulahti Cup and in 2007 won Turnir Puchkova with the Severstal Cherepovets.

== Career statistics ==
=== Regular season and playoffs ===
			Regular season					Playoffs
Season	Team	League	GP	G	A	Pts	PIM	GP	G	A	Pts	PIM
1997–98	Lada–2 Togliatti	RUS.3	7	0	0	0	0	—	—	—	—	—
1998–99	Lada–2 Togliatti	RUS.3	47	13	6	19		—	—	—	—	—
1999–2000	Lada–2 Togliatti	RUS.3	35	12	12	24	34	—	—	—	—	—
2000–01	Lada Togliatti	RSL	36	0	0	0	6	4	0	0	0	0
2001–02	Red Deer Rebels	WHL	71	32	57	89	54	23	14	9	23	28
2002–03	Norfolk Admirals	AHL	62	6	5	11	36	9	0	0	0	8
2003–04	Norfolk Admirals	AHL	51	9	18	27	22	8	0	3	3	2
2003–04	Chicago Blackhawks	NHL	30	1	7	8	8	—	—	—	—	—
2004–05	Norfolk Admirals	AHL	59	12	15	27	43	3	0	0	0	0
2005–06	Spartak Moscow	RSL	29	5	7	12	38	—	—	—	—	—
2005–06	Chicago Blackhawks	NHL	10	1	2	3	8	—	—	—	—	—
2005–06	Norfolk Admirals	AHL	8	1	3	4	8	—	—	—	—	—
2005–06	Florida Panthers	NHL	13	0	1	1	4	—	—	—	—	—
2006–07	Severstal Cherepovets	RSL	52	6	16	22	111	5	1	1	2	4
2007–08	Severstal Cherepovets	RSL	55	4	12	16	52	8	2	1	3	4
2008–09	Severstal Cherepovets	KHL	56	7	8	15	48	—	—	—	—	—
2009–10	Severstal Cherepovets	KHL	35	0	7	7	20	—	—	—	—	—
2009–10	Spartak Moscow	KHL	9	1	3	4	4	7	0	0	0	2
2010–11	HC Yugra	KHL	53	11	10	21	44	6	0	1	1	4
2011–12	Metallurg Magnitogorsk	KHL	52	8	10	18	26	12	1	4	5	2
2012–13	Metallurg Magnitogorsk	KHL	52	1	7	8	24	7	0	0	0	0
2013–14	HC Yugra	KHL	32	2	11	13	18	—	—	—	—	—
2014–15	HC Vityaz	KHL	46	3	5	8	50	—	—	—	—	—
2015–16	HC Sochi	KHL	30	0	1	1	16	1	0	0	0	2
RSL totals			172	15	34	49	207	17	2	3	5	8
NHL totals			53	2	10	12	20	—	—	—	—	—
KHL totals			257	28	45	73	166	32	1	5	6	8

=== International ===
Year	Team	Event	Result	GP	G	A	Pts	PIM
2000	Russia	WJC18	2nd place, silver medalist(s)	6	1	5	6	2
2001	Russia	WJC	7th	7	0	1	1	6
Junior totals				13	1	6	7	8

== Awards and honours ==
Award	Year
WHL
East Second All-Star Team	2002

Awards and achievements
Preceded by Steve McCarthy	Chicago Blackhawks first-round draft pick 2000	Succeeded by Pavel Vorobiev
