= Alex Petrovic =

Canadian ice hockey player (born 1992)

Alexander Petrovic
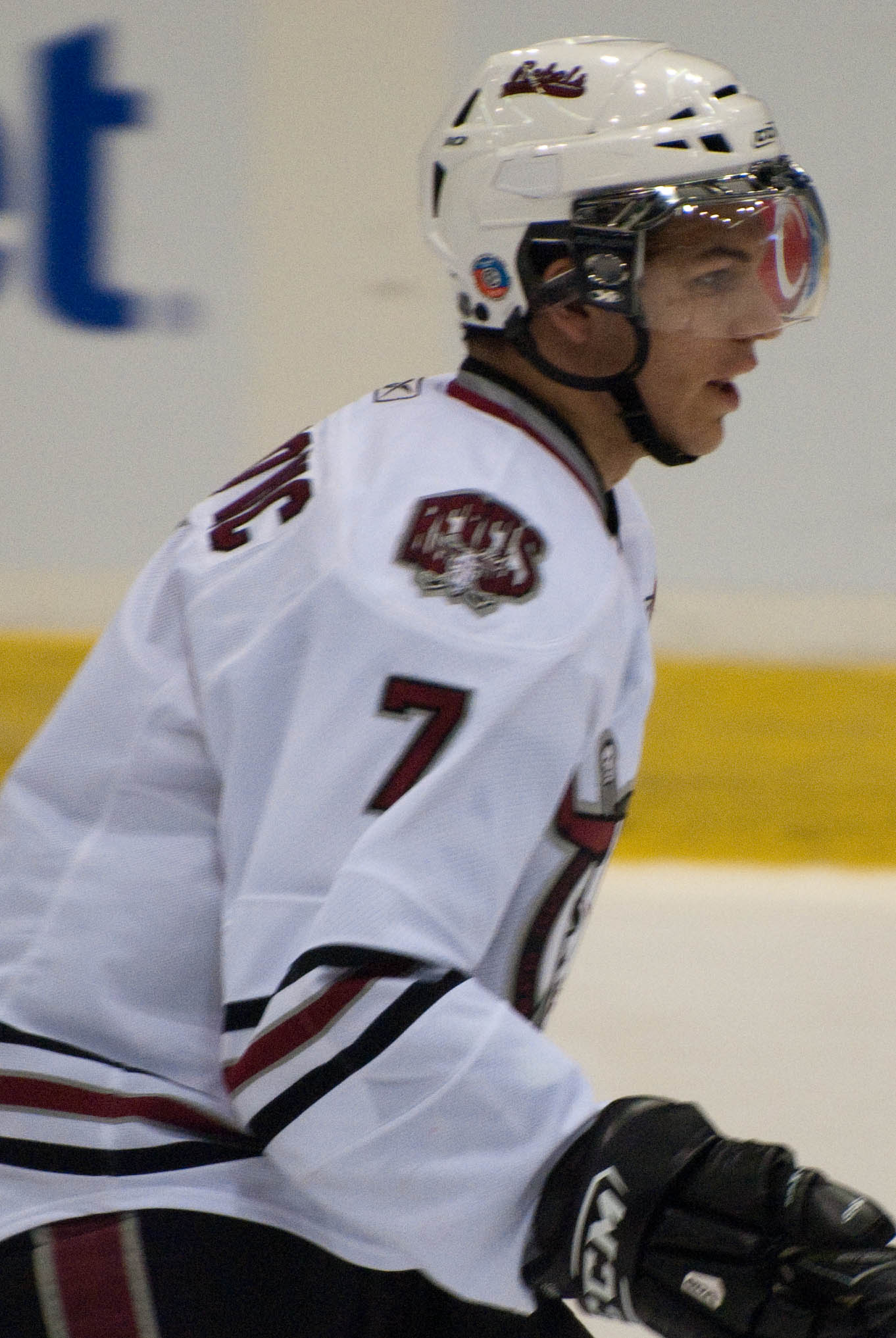
- Petrovic with the Red Deer Rebels in 2010
- Born: March 3, 1992 (age 34) Edmonton, Alberta, Canada
- Height: 6 ft 5 in (196 cm)
- Weight: 215 lb (98 kg; 15 st 5 lb)
- Position: Defence
- Shoots: Right
- NHL team (P) Cur. team Former teams: Florida Panthers; Charlotte Checkers (AHL); Edmonton Oilers; Dallas Stars
- NHL draft: 36th overall, 2010; Florida Panthers
- Playing career: 2012–present

Alexander Petrovic (born March 3, 1992) is a Canadian professional ice hockey player who is a defenceman for the Charlotte Checkers of the American Hockey League (AHL) while under contract to the Florida Panthers of the National Hockey League (NHL). Petrovic was selected by the Panthers in the second round, 36th overall, of the 2010 NHL entry draft from the Red Deer Rebels in the Western Hockey League (WHL).

== Playing career ==
As a youth, Petrovic played in the 2004 Quebec International Pee-Wee Hockey Tournament with the North East Eagles minor ice hockey team from Edmonton.

=== Junior ===
Petrovic was drafted by the Red Deer Rebels in the second round of the 2007 Western Hockey League (WHL) Bantam Draft. Prior to being drafted, he had been playing midget hockey in Edmonton. He played his first full WHL season in 2008–2009, recording 13 points in 66 games. Leading up to the 2010 NHL entry draft, Petrovic was ranked 29th among North American skaters by the NHL Central Scouting Bureau, and the Florida Panthers ultimately drafted Petrovic in the second round, 36th overall. Petrovic played his entire junior career with the Rebels, turning pro for good after the 2011–2012 WHL season.

=== Professional ===
==== Florida Panthers ====
On April 18, 2011, the Florida Panthers signed Petrovic to a three-year, entry-level professional contract. He made his professional debut in the American Hockey League (AHL) playoffs with the San Antonio Rampage after the 2011–12 season. Petrovic began the 2012–13 season with the Rampage in the AHL, but was called up to the Panthers in April 2013. On April 18, he made his NHL debut against the New York Rangers, playing in six games at the NHL level near the end of the season. He did not score any points, however, though he did record 25 penalty minutes.

Petrovic attended training camp with the Panthers prior to the 2013–14 season, and was expected to stick with the club for the entire season, but he was one of the earliest cuts and returned to San Antonio of the AHL. On January 26, 2016, Petrovic scored his first NHL goal against the Toronto Maple Leafs. Two weeks later on February 9 in a 7–4 Panthers win over the Buffalo Sabres at First Niagara Center, he picked up a goal and an assist but fought Evander Kane three times. The three fights by the same two adversaries in a single NHL match was the first such occurrence since Jody Shelley and Bob Probert did it on January 10, 2002.

==== Edmonton Oilers ====
During his seventh season with the Panthers in 2018–19, having slowed his production and effectiveness on the third-pairing with Florida producing just 1 assist in 26 games, Petrovic was traded to the Edmonton Oilers in exchange for Chris Wideman and a conditional third-round pick in 2019 on December 30, 2018.

==== Boston Bruins ====
In the 2019 offseason, as an unrestricted free agent, Petrovic signed a professional tryout contract with the Boston Bruins. After a successful camp with the Bruins, on September 26, 2019, Petrovic was signed to a one-year, two-way contract by the Bruins and assigned to AHL affiliate, the Providence Bruins. Petrovic spent the duration of his contract in the AHL, posting 2 goals and 20 points in 54 regular season games, before the season was cancelled due to the COVID-19 pandemic.

==== Calgary Flames ====
A free agent from the Bruins, Petrovic signed a one-year, two-way contract with the Calgary Flames on October 9, 2020. He began the pandemic delayed and shortened 2020–21 season, with the Flames AHL affiliate, the Stockton Heat, producing 12 points in just 17 games. He was later recalled to the Flames taxi squad, but did not appear with the club.

==== Dallas Stars ====
A free agent from the Flames, Petrovic signed a one-year, two-way contract with the Dallas Stars on July 28, 2021. On May 17, 2024, Petrovic made his playoff debut of the 2024 Stanley Cup Playoffs in Game 6 of the Western Conference semifinals vs the Colorado Avalanche, recording 16 minutes of ice time in relief of Nils Lundkvist.

==== Return to Florida ====
Having re-established himself in the NHL with the Stars, Petrovic returned to his original club, the Florida Panthers, as a free agent in agreeing to a two-year, $1.75 million contract on July 1, 2026.

== Personal life ==
As a child, Petrovic's favourite player was Mike Modano and his favourite team was the Dallas Stars. He models his game after defenceman Chris Pronger. He is of Serbian descent.

== Career statistics ==
			Regular season					Playoffs
Season	Team	League	GP	G	A	Pts	PIM	GP	G	A	Pts	PIM
2007–08	MLAC Maple Leafs	AMHL	31	3	8	11	80	—	—	—	—	—
2007–08	Red Deer Rebels	WHL	10	1	0	1	2	—	—	—	—	—
2008–09	Red Deer Rebels	WHL	66	1	12	13	70	—	—	—	—	—
2009–10	Red Deer Rebels	WHL	57	8	19	27	87	4	0	0	0	4
2010–11	Red Deer Rebels	WHL	69	7	50	57	140	9	0	6	6	23
2011–12	Red Deer Rebels	WHL	68	12	36	48	141	—	—	—	—	—
2011–12	San Antonio Rampage	AHL	5	0	1	1	0	9	2	4	6	14
2012–13	San Antonio Rampage	AHL	55	4	13	17	102	—	—	—	—	—
2012–13	Florida Panthers	NHL	6	0	0	0	25	—	—	—	—	—
2013–14	San Antonio Rampage	AHL	43	2	11	13	79	—	—	—	—	—
2013–14	Florida Panthers	NHL	7	0	1	1	8	—	—	—	—	—
2014–15	San Antonio Rampage	AHL	41	3	17	20	59	3	0	1	1	0
2014–15	Florida Panthers	NHL	33	0	3	3	34	—	—	—	—	—
2015–16	Florida Panthers	NHL	66	2	15	17	90	6	1	3	4	4
2016–17	Florida Panthers	NHL	49	1	13	14	79	—	—	—	—	—
2017–18	Florida Panthers	NHL	67	2	11	13	98	—	—	—	—	—
2018–19	Florida Panthers	NHL	26	0	1	1	24	—	—	—	—	—
2018–19	Edmonton Oilers	NHL	9	0	1	1	2	—	—	—	—	—
2019–20	Providence Bruins	AHL	54	2	18	20	24	—	—	—	—	—
2020–21	Stockton Heat	AHL	17	2	10	12	14	—	—	—	—	—
2021–22	Texas Stars	AHL	71	5	14	19	73	2	0	1	1	2
2022–23	Texas Stars	AHL	71	9	18	27	62	8	3	2	5	4
2023–24	Texas Stars	AHL	70	5	17	22	40	7	1	0	1	2
2023–24	Dallas Stars	NHL	1	0	0	0	0	7	0	0	0	2
2024–25	Texas Stars	AHL	58	5	20	25	66	4	0	1	1	9
2024–25	Dallas Stars	NHL	5	0	0	0	4	17	1	1	2	4
2025–26	Dallas Stars	NHL	54	2	8	10	47	1	0	0	0	0
NHL totals			323	7	53	60	411	31	2	4	6	10

== Awards and honours ==
Award	Year
WHL
East Second All-Star Team	2011
