= Masi Marjamäki =

Finnish ice hockey player

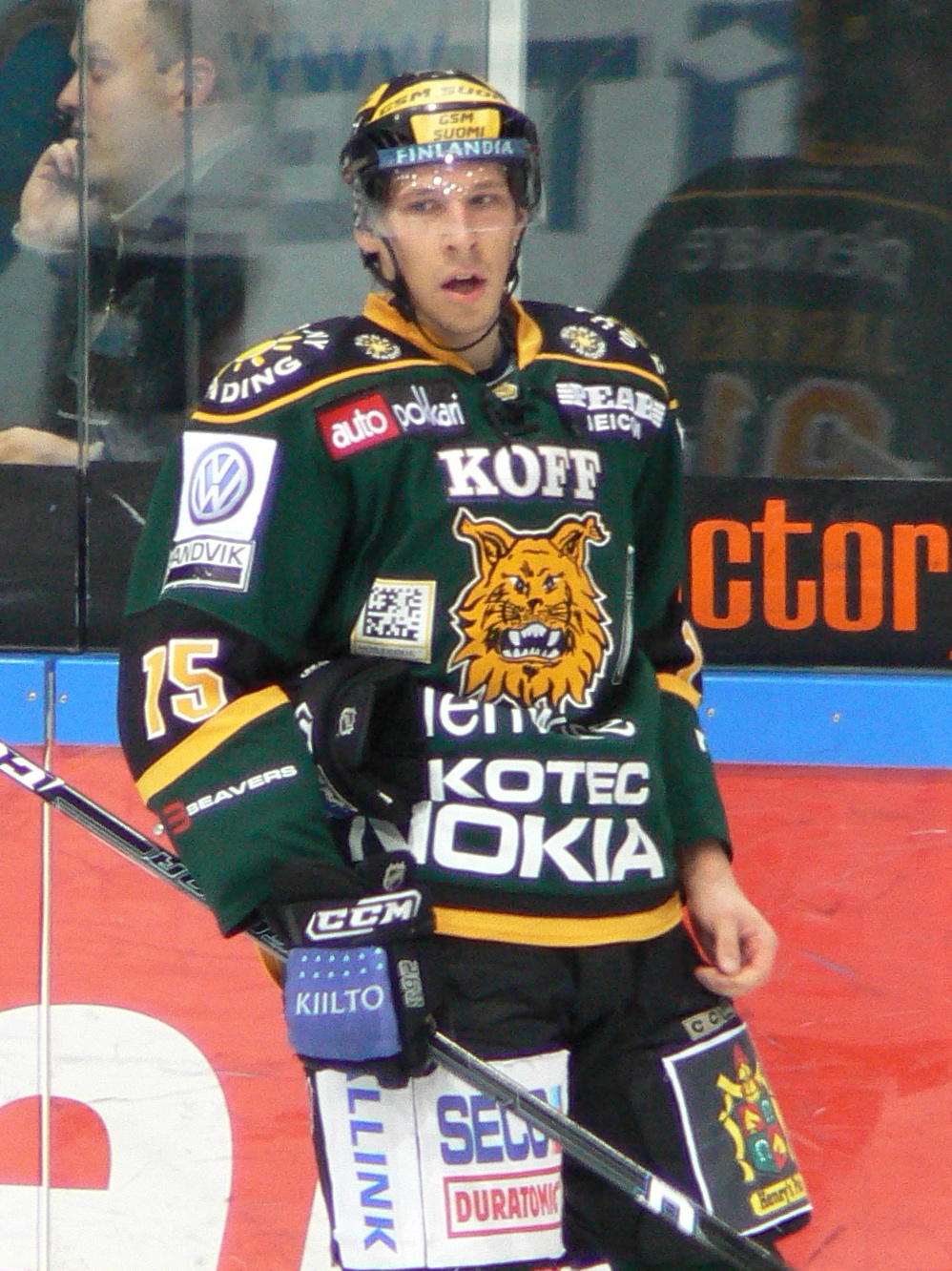
- Born: January 16, 1985 (age 41) Pori, Finland
- Height: 6 ft 2 in (188 cm)
- Weight: 203 lb (92 kg; 14 st 7 lb)
- Position: Left Wing
- Shot: Left
- Played for: New York Islanders; Ässät Pori; Ilves Tampere; Tappara; Jokerit; Almtuna IS; Piráti Chomutov; Cardiff Devils
- NHL draft: 66th overall, 2003; Boston Bruins; 144th overall, 2005; New York Islanders
- Playing career: 2005–2020

Masi Marjamäki (born January 16, 1985) is a Finnish professional ice hockey player who most recently played for Cardiff Devils in the UK EIHL. He previously played for Piráti Chomutov of the Czech Extraliga (ELH).

== Playing career ==
Marjamäki, a 6'2" 205-pound left wing, was originally drafted by the Boston Bruins as the 66th overall pick in the 2003 NHL entry draft. However, he never came to terms with the Bruins and re-entered the draft in 2005, where he was the 144th overall pick by the New York Islanders.

He played his junior hockey first in his hometown Porin Ässät before moving over the ocean to the Red Deer Rebels and the Moose Jaw Warriors of the WHL before becoming professional in the 2005–2006 season.

After totaling 31 points (9 goals and 22 assists) along with 77 penalty minutes in 75 games for Bridgeport (the Islanders' top affiliate) in the 2005–06 season, Marjamäki was called up by the big club and made his NHL debut on April 18, 2006, against the Philadelphia Flyers, logging 5 minutes and 17 seconds of glory.

Marjamäki is known for his gritty, physical style of play, but is also a good stickhandler who can put points on the board. He has received comparisons to Kirk Maltby of the NHL's Detroit Red Wings.

After a frustrating start to the 2007–08 AHL season in which Marjamäki was scratched every game, he asked the Islanders to be reassigned to Finland. The Islanders granted his request, and he spent the season playing for Ässät.

Marjamäki was signed by Ilves in 2008, and played there until his injury in the early 2012–13 season. He was unable to play at all in the 2013–14 season, and signed with local rival Tappara for the 2014–15 season with an additional one-year option.

In the 2015–16 season, he played one year for Ässät before joining Jokerit to play in KHL. He played a total of 61 games for Jokerit during one and a half seasons before joining Almtuna IS of the Swedish HockeyAllsvenskan.

On October 4, 2018, Marjamäki, having left Sweden as a free agent, continued his career in the Czech Republic, agreeing to a one-year contract with Piráti Chomutov of the ELH for the 2018–19 season.

In July 2019, Marjamäki moved to the UK to sign for the EIHL's Cardiff Devils.

=== Coaching ===
Marjamäki became the Skills Coach for the AJHL Blackfalds Bulldogs in the 2021–22 season.

== Career statistics ==
=== Regular season and playoffs ===
			Regular season					Playoffs
Season	Team	League	GP	G	A	Pts	PIM	GP	G	A	Pts	PIM
2001–02	Ässät	FIN U18	24	6	16	22	93	1	0	1	1	2
2001–02	Ässät	FIN.2 U20	1	0	0	0	0	5	3	2	5	2
2002–03	Red Deer Rebels	WHL	65	15	20	35	56	23	1	2	3	20
2003–04	Red Deer Rebels	WHL	28	6	8	14	46	—	—	—	—	—
2003–04	Moose Jaw Warriors	WHL	35	15	10	25	57	10	1	3	4	15
2004–05	Moose Jaw Warriors	WHL	51	14	32	46	49	5	1	2	3	5
2005–06	Bridgeport Sound Tigers	AHL	75	9	22	31	77	7	3	0	3	4
2005–06	New York Islanders	NHL	1	0	0	0	0	—	—	—	—	—
2006–07	Bridgeport Sound Tigers	AHL	78	6	11	17	80	—	—	—	—	—
2007–08	Ässät	SM-l	24	5	6	11	28	—	—	—	—	—
2008–09	Ilves	SM-l	43	6	13	19	103	3	2	1	3	4
2009–10	Ilves	SM-l	43	12	10	22	118	—	—	—	—	—
2010–11	Ilves	SM-l	51	10	20	30	82	6	1	2	3	6
2011–12	Ilves	SM-l	49	13	11	24	67	—	—	—	—	—
2012–13	Ilves	SM-l	9	3	3	6	6	—	—	—	—	—
2014–15	Tappara	Liiga	41	4	2	6	37	19	2	1	3	10
2014–15	LeKi	Mestis	8	3	3	6	4	—	—	—	—	—
2015–16	Ässät	Liiga	42	10	14	24	52	—	—	—	—	—
2016–17	Jokerit	KHL	37	2	6	8	34	3	0	0	0	2
2017–18	Jokerit	KHL	24	2	2	4	28	—	—	—	—	—
2017–18	Almtuna IS	Allsv	14	4	2	6	29	5	2	0	2	2
2018–19	Piráti Chomutov	ELH	45	8	8	16	28	—	—	—	—	—
2019–20	Cardiff Devils	EIHL	43	8	11	19	88	—	—	—	—	—
NHL totals			1	0	0	0	0	—	—	—	—	—
Liiga totals			302	63	79	142	493	28	5	4	9	20
KHL totals			61	4	8	12	62	3	0	0	0	2

Medal record

Representing Finland

Ice hockey

World Junior Championships
Bronze medal – third place	2004 Finland	

=== International ===
Year	Team	Event	Result	GP	G	A	Pts	PIM
2004	Finland	WJC	3rd place, bronze medalist(s)	7	2	1	3	2
2005	Finland	WJC	5th	6	0	0	0	12
Junior totals				13	2	1	3	14
