= Jozef Balej =

Slovak ice hockey player (born 1982)

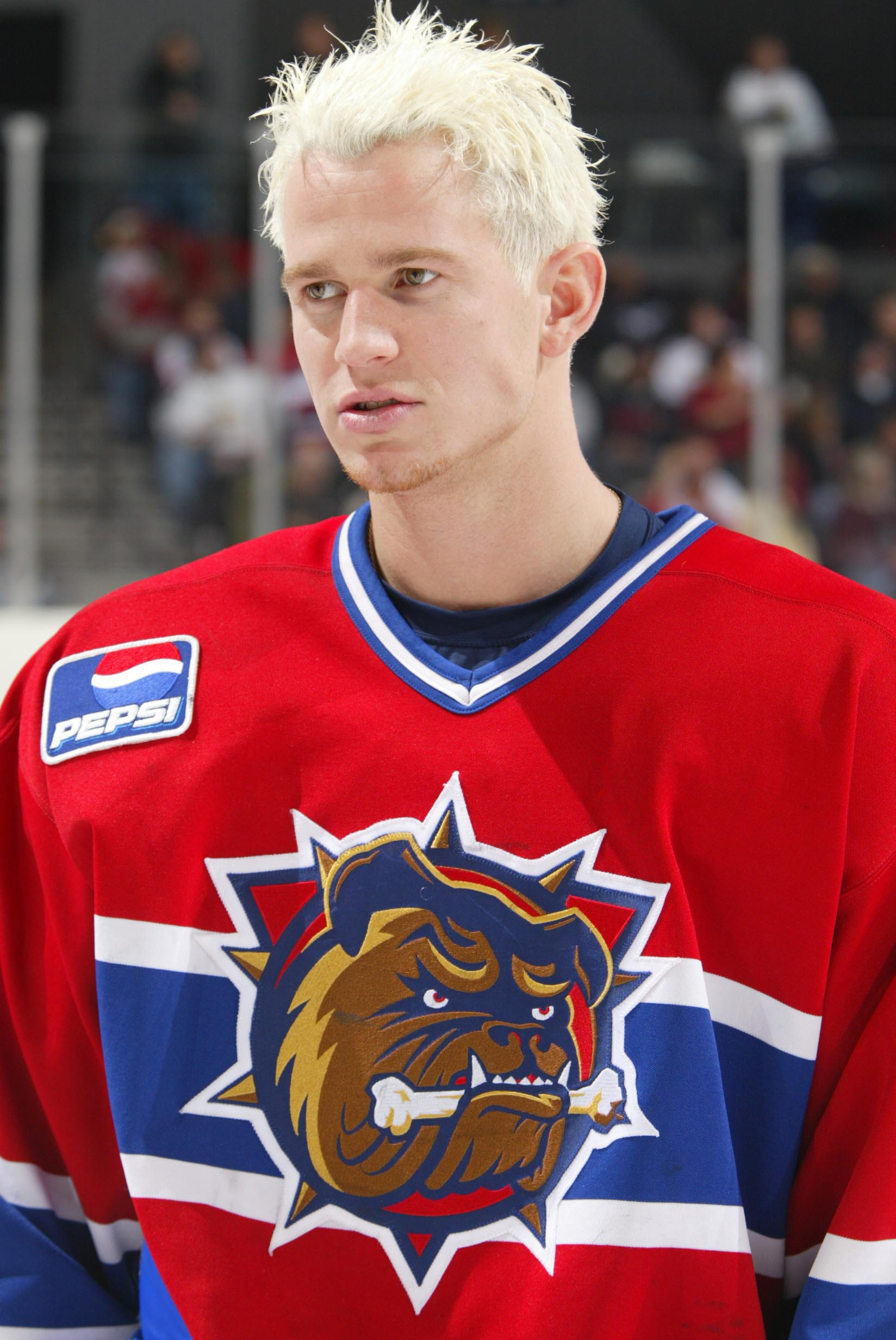
- Born: February 22, 1982 (age 44) Myjava, Czechoslovakia
- Height: 6 ft 0 in (183 cm)
- Weight: 190 lb (86 kg; 13 st 8 lb)
- Position: Right wing
- Shot: Right
- Played for: Montreal Canadiens; New York Rangers; Vancouver Canucks; HC Fribourg-Gottéron; HC Oceláři Třinec; HC Kometa Brno; HC Slovan Bratislava; HC Plzeň; Piráti Chomutov; ŠHK 37 Piešťany; HC Ambrì-Piotta; KHL Medveščak Zagreb; MsHK Zilina; EHC Freiburg
- NHL draft: 78th overall, 2000; Montreal Canadiens
- Playing career: 2002–2020

Jozef Balej (born February 22, 1982) is a Slovak former professional ice hockey right winger. He was selected in the third round, 78th overall, by the Montreal Canadiens in the 2000 NHL entry draft. Balej also played for the New York Rangers and Vancouver Canucks.

== Playing career ==
As a youth, Balej played in the 1995 and 1996 Quebec International Pee-Wee Hockey Tournaments with a team from Bratislava.

Balej left his native Slovakia in 1998 to develop his game in North America, and spent a season in the USHL before moving to the Portland Winter Hawks of the Western Hockey League. After a solid first season in Portland in which he recorded 22 goals, Balej was selected 78th overall in the 2000 NHL entry draft by the Montreal Canadiens. He would spend two more seasons in Portland, turning in a dominant performance in 2001–02 with 51 goals in 65 games.

Signed by Montreal, Balej turned pro in 2002 and spent the 2002–03 season in the AHL, where he struggled, recording just 5 goals and 20 points in 56 games. While he possessed dynamic speed and a heavy shot, the slightly built Balej struggled with the bigger, stronger pro game and took time to adjust. However, he showed marked improvement in 2003–04, scoring 25 goals and 58 points in 55 games, and earned a four-game callup to Montreal.

At the trade deadline near the end of the 03–04 season, Balej was traded to the New York Rangers as the centerpiece of a deal for star winger Alexei Kovalev. With the Rangers out of the playoff picture, he was given an extended look in New York, appearing in 13 games and scoring his first NHL goal and adding 4 assists for 5 points. At the conclusion of the season, he was reassigned to the Hartford Wolfpack of the AHL for the playoffs where he scored 9 goals and 16 points in 16 games. He continued to play for Hartford during the 2004–05 NHL lockout, but had a disappointing year with 20 goals and 42 points in 69 games.

At the start of the 2005–06 season, Balej was dealt to the Vancouver Canucks with a 6th round draft pick in 2008 for Fedor Fedorov. He played well for the AHL Manitoba Moose to start the season, and earned a one-game callup to the Canucks, in which he played well and recorded an assist. However, shortly after his return to Manitoba he suffered a gruesome injury when he crashed into the boards and harpooned himself in the midsection with his stick. The blow crushed his kidney and caused severe internal bleeding, and was initially feared to be career-threatening. However, he battled back to return for the end of the season and the playoffs.

Balej was given a qualifying offer by the Canucks to return for the 2006–07 season, but opted instead to sign in Switzerland for HC Fribourg-Gottéron, where he recorded 13 goals and 30 points in 37 games. Balej re-signed with the Canucks for 2007–08, but suffered through an injury-plagued year in the minors in which he appeared in only 16 games.

In 2008, Balej signed with HC Oceláři Třinec of the Czech league. Unfortunately, injuries have continued to plague his career, as he has been limited to only 52 appearances in two years with Oceláři Třinec.

== Career statistics ==
=== Regular season and playoffs ===
			Regular season					Playoffs
Season	Team	League	GP	G	A	Pts	PIM	GP	G	A	Pts	PIM
1996–97	Dukla Trenčín	SVK U18	51	31	25	56	36	—	—	—	—	—
1997–98	Dukla Trenčín	SVK U18	52	57	40	97	60	—	—	—	—	—
1998–99	Thunder Bay Flyers	USHL	38	8	7	15	9	—	—	—	—	—
1998–99	Rochester Mustangs	USHL	17	0	1	1	2	—	—	—	—	—
1999–2000	Portland Winter Hawks	WHL	65	22	23	45	33	—	—	—	—	—
2000–01	Portland Winter Hawks	WHL	46	32	21	53	18	16	6	9	15	6
2001–02	Portland Winter Hawks	WHL	65	51	41	92	52	7	0	2	2	6
2002–03	Hamilton Bulldogs	AHL	56	5	15	20	29	3	1	0	1	2
2003–04	Hamilton Bulldogs	AHL	55	25	33	58	32	—	—	—	—	—
2003–04	Montreal Canadiens	NHL	4	0	0	0	0	—	—	—	—	—
2003–04	Hartford Wolf Pack	AHL	5	1	3	4	21	16	9	7	16	10
2003–04	New York Rangers	NHL	13	1	4	5	4	—	—	—	—	—
2004–05	Hartford Wolf Pack	AHL	69	20	22	42	46	6	0	0	0	4
2005–06	Vancouver Canucks	NHL	1	0	1	1	0	—	—	—	—	—
2005–06	Manitoba Moose	AHL	39	14	15	29	20	4	1	0	1	4
2006–07	HC Fribourg–Gottéron	NLA	37	13	17	30	44	—	—	—	—	—
2007–08	Manitoba Moose	AHL	16	4	9	13	10	—	—	—	—	—
2008–09	HC Oceláři Třinec	ELH	39	17	10	27	40	5	3	0	3	2
2009–10	HC Oceláři Třinec	ELH	13	4	5	9	6	5	2	1	3	6
2010–11	HC Kometa Brno	ELH	27	10	4	14	12	—	—	—	—	—
2011–12	HC Slovan Bratislava	SVK	20	5	6	11	8	—	—	—	—	—
2011–12	HC Kometa Brno	ELH	25	2	3	5	12	17	3	1	4	6
2012–13	HC Škoda Plzeň	ELH	41	15	8	23	16	7	3	2	5	4
2013–14	Piráti Chomutov	ELH	37	8	6	14	16	—	—	—	—	—
2014–15	HC Škoda Plzeň	ELH	47	6	6	12	28	2	0	1	1	0
2015–16	ŠHK 37 Piešťany	SVK	18	9	6	15	26	—	—	—	—	—
2015–16	HC Red Ice	SUI.2	28	13	16	29	33	8	4	5	9	6
2016–17	HC Red Ice	SUI.2	43	22	22	44	26	5	3	4	7	6
2017–18	KHL Medveščak Zagreb	AUT	30	9	8	17	12	6	0	2	2	6
2018–19	MsHK DOXXbet Žilina	SVK	31	3	8	11	18	—	—	—	—	—
2018–19	EHC Freiburg	GER.2	8	5	2	7	4	—	—	—	—	—
2019–20	EHC Freiburg	GER.2	4	2	0	2	4	—	—	—	—	—
AHL totals			240	69	97	166	158	29	11	7	18	20
NHL totals			18	1	5	6	4	—	—	—	—	—
ELH totals			229	62	42	104	130	51	16	11	27	24

=== International ===
Year	Team	Event	Result	GP	G	A	Pts	PIM
2000	Slovakia	WJC18	5th	6	0	5	5	4
2001	Slovakia	WJC	8th	7	3	3	6	4
Junior totals				13	3	8	11	8

== Awards and honors ==
Award	Year
WHL
West First All-Star Team	2002
CHL Second All-Star Team	2002
AHL
All-Star Game	2004
