= Duncan Milroy =

Canadian ice hockey player (born 1983)

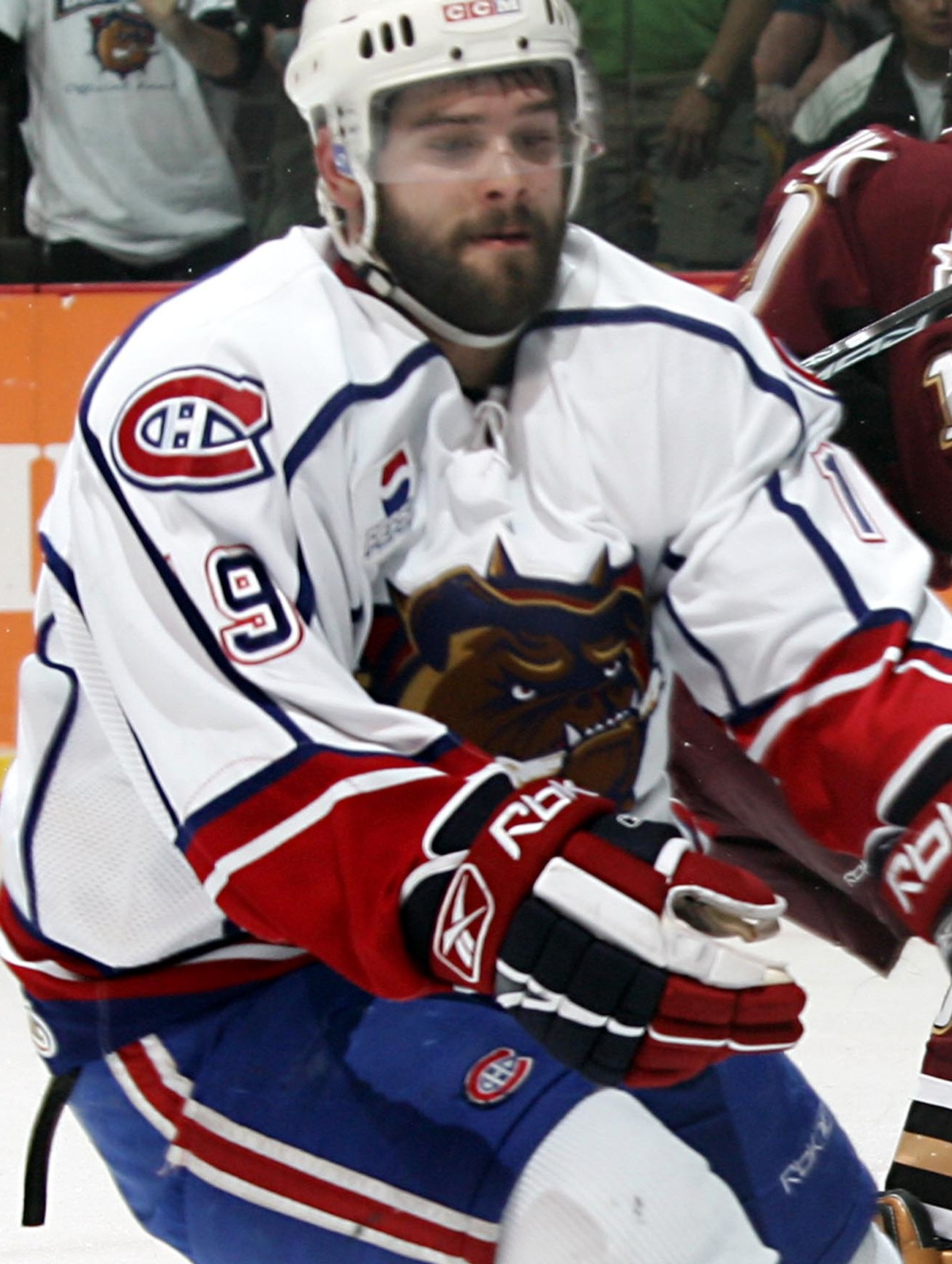
- Born: February 8, 1983 (age 43) Edmonton, Alberta, Canada
- Height: 6 ft 1 in (185 cm)
- Weight: 195 lb (88 kg; 13 st 13 lb)
- Position: Right wing
- Shot: Right
- Played for: Montreal Canadiens; ERC Ingolstadt; BK Mladá Boleslav; Krefeld Pinguine; Vålerenga
- NHL draft: 37th overall, 2001; Montreal Canadiens
- Playing career: 2003–2013

Duncan Alexander James Milroy (born February 8, 1983) is a Canadian former professional ice hockey right winger. He was selected in the second round, 37th overall, by the Montreal Canadiens in the 2001 NHL entry draft.

== Playing career ==
Milroy played in the junior hockey in the Western Hockey League for the Swift Current Broncos. He was drafted in the second round, 37th overall, by the Montreal Canadiens in the 2001 NHL entry draft. After a few seasons with the Hamilton Bulldogs of the AHL, Milroy was recalled by the Montreal Canadiens in February 2007 and played 5 games with the team gathering 1 point (an assist). He was reassigned to Hamilton on February 25, 2007, where he remained until the end of the 2007–08 season.

Following a single season in the Germany with ERC Ingolstadt, Milroy returned to North America and signed a one-year contract with the Minnesota Wild on July 17, 2009. After playing the duration of the 2009–10 season with the Wild's AHL affiliate, the Houston Aeros, Milroy again ventured to Europe signing a one-year contract with BK Mladá Boleslav of the Czech Extraliga on September 2, 2010.

With only 6 points in 20 games with Boleslav during the 2010–11 season, Milroy left to commence his second spell in the DEL with Krefeld Pinguine. Milroy finished second on Krefeld with 8 postseason points to earn a one-year extension to remain in Krefeld on May 13, 2011.

== Career statistics ==
=== Regular season and playoffs ===
			Regular season					Playoffs
Season	Team	League	GP	G	A	Pts	PIM	GP	G	A	Pts	PIM
1998–99	Swift Current Broncos	WHL	3	0	0	0	0	—	—	—	—	—
1999–2000	Swift Current Broncos	WHL	68	15	15	30	20	12	3	5	8	12
2000–01	Swift Current Broncos	WHL	68	38	54	92	51	19	9	12	21	6
2001–02	Kootenay Ice	WHL	64	45	42	87	44	22	17	20	37	26
2002–03	Kootenay Ice	WHL	61	34	44	78	40	11	5	3	8	8
2003–04	Hamilton Bulldogs	AHL	50	4	10	14	14	10	3	1	4	4
2004–05	Hamilton Bulldogs	AHL	76	15	18	33	18	3	0	0	0	2
2005–06	Hamilton Bulldogs	AHL	77	16	19	35	63	—	—	—	—	—
2006–07	Hamilton Bulldogs	AHL	64	25	33	58	24	22	2	11	13	10
2006–07	Montreal Canadiens	NHL	5	0	1	1	0	—	—	—	—	—
2007–08	Hamilton Bulldogs	AHL	79	15	24	39	37	—	—	—	—	—
2008–09	ERC Ingolstadt	DEL	49	14	34	48	16	—	—	—	—	—
2009–10	Houston Aeros	AHL	74	12	24	36	28	—	—	—	—	—
2010–11	BK Mladá Boleslav	ELH	20	3	3	6	2	—	—	—	—	—
2010–11	Krefeld Pinguine	DEL	32	3	12	15	18	8	2	6	8	4
2011–12	Krefeld Pinguine	DEL	45	6	22	28	8	—	—	—	—	—
2012–13	Vålerenga	NOR	9	3	5	8	4	3	0	0	0	0
AHL totals			420	87	128	215	184	35	5	12	17	16
NHL totals			5	0	1	1	0	—	—	—	—	—
DEL totals			126	23	68	91	42	8	2	6	8	4

=== International ===
Year	Team	Event	GP	G	A	Pts	PIM
2000	Canada	U18	3	1	1	2	2
Junior totals			3	1	1	2	2

== Awards and honours ==
Award	Year
AHL
Yanick Dupre Memorial Award	2005
