= Red Deer Rebels =

Western Hockey League team in Red Deer, Alberta

- City: Red Deer, Alberta
- League: Western Hockey League
- Conference: Eastern
- Division: Central
- Founded: 1992
- Home arena: Marchant Crane Centrium
- Colours: Burgundy, black, white and silver
- General manager: Brent Sutter
- Head coach: Marc Habscheid
- Website: chl.ca/whl-rebels

Championships
- Regular season titles: 2 (2000–01, 2001–02)
- Playoff championships: Conference Championships; 3 (2000–01, 2001–02, 2002–03); Ed Chynoweth Cup; 1 (2001); Memorial Cup; 1 (2001)

Current uniform

The Red Deer Rebels are a Canadian major junior ice hockey team based in Red Deer, Alberta. The Rebels are members of the Western Hockey League and play home games at the Marchant Crane Centrium. The Rebels won the President's Cup and the Memorial Cup during the 2000–01 season.

== History ==
In 1991, coach Terry Simpson and his brother were granted an expansion franchise in Red Deer. From a name-the-team contest, the top three ideas were Rebels, Renegades, and Centurions. The Rebels selected Mike McBain as their first player in the Bantam Draft. The Rebels' first game was on September 25, 1992, in Red Deer against the Prince Albert Raiders; the Rebels won 6–3.

In 1999, the Simpsons sold the team to Brent Sutter. With Sutter as coach and manager, the Rebels won three consecutive division and conference titles between 2000–01 and 2002–03. The period began with President's Cup and Memorial Cup championships in 2001, with Jeff Smith scoring the overtime winner against the Val-d'Or Foreurs in the Memorial Cup final.

Brent Sutter stepped aside as coach in 2007 and his brother, Brian Sutter, took over the team for the 2007–08 season. Brian was with the team for just one season before former captain Jesse Wallin took over. In 2012, Brent Sutter fired Wallin and took over as head coach for the first time since 2007.

The Rebels hosted team of the 2016 Memorial Cup tournament, thus making their second appearance at the national championship. The Rebels advanced to the semi-final, where they were eliminated by the Rouyn-Noranda Huskies.

In 2022, the team set a WHL record for the longest winning streak at the beginning of their season, opening with 15 straight wins.

== Season-by-season record ==
Legend: GP = Games played, W = Wins, L = Losses, T = Ties OTL = Overtime losses Pts = Points, GF = Goals for, GA = Goals against

Original Rebels "Skate" logo, used c. 1992–97.

Season	GP	W	L	T	OTL	GF	GA	Points	Standing	Playoffs	Head coach	Assistant coach	General manager
1992–93	72	31	39	2	-	284	329	64	6th East	Lost in first round	Peter Anholt	Rick Pankiw, Mike Moller	Wayne Simpson
1993–94	72	35	36	1	-	310	334	71	6th East	Lost in first round	Peter Anholt	Mike Moller	Wayne Simpson
1994–95	72	17	51	4	-	209	356	38	9th East	Out of playoffs	Peter Anholt	Mike Moller	Wayne Simpson
1995–96	72	28	39	5	-	263	300	61	4th Central	Lost East Conference semi-final	Rick Carriere	Jim Hammett	Wayne Simpson
1996–97	72	43	26	3	-	317	297	89	2nd Central	Lost Eastern Conference final	Rick Carriere	Doug Hobson	Wayne Simpson
1997–98	72	27	40	5	-	281	323	59	3rd Central	Lost Eastern Conference quarter-final	Rick Carriere, Doug Hobson	Doug Hobson, Kurt Lackton	Wayne Simpson
1998–99	72	34	33	5	-	274	250	73	2nd Central	Lost Eastern Conference semi-final	Terry Simpson	Peter Anholt	Wayne Simpson
1999–2000	72	32	31	9	0	227	229	73	3rd Central	Lost Eastern Conference quarter-final	Brent Sutter	Peter Anholt, Dallas Gaume	Brent Sutter
2000–01	72	54	12	3	3	304	168	114	1st Central	Won Championship & Memorial Cup	Brent Sutter	Dan McDonald, Dallas Gaume	Brent Sutter
2001–02	72	46	18	7	1	264	184	100	1st Central	Lost final	Brent Sutter	Dallas Gaume	Brent Sutter
2002–03	72	50	17	3	2	271	160	105	1st Central	Lost final	Brent Sutter	Dallas Gaume	Brent Sutter
2003–04	72	35	22	10	5	167	169	85	2nd Central	Lost Eastern Conference final	Brent Sutter	Dallas Gaume	Brent Sutter
2004–05	72	36	26	6	4	206	200	82	4th Central	Lost Eastern Conference quarter-final	Brent Sutter	Dallas Gaume	Brent Sutter
2005–06	72	26	40	1	5	166	220	58	5th Central	Out of playoffs	Brent Sutter	Jesse Wallin, Dallas Gaume	Brent Sutter
2006–07	72	35	28	4	5	206	214	79	4th Central	Lost Eastern Conference quarter-final	Brent Sutter	Jesse Wallin, Dallas Gaume	Brent Sutter
2007–08	72	18	47	4	3	145	255	43	6th Central	Out of playoffs	Brian Sutter	Jesse Wallin, Dallas Gaume	Brent Sutter
2008–09	72	25	37	1	9	172	250	60	6th Central	Out of playoffs	Jesse Wallin	Dallas Gaume, Bryce Thoma	Brent Sutter
2009–10	72	39	28	0	5	202	222	83	4th Central	Lost Eastern Conference quarter-final	Jesse Wallin	Dallas Gaume, Bryce Thoma	Jesse Wallin (VP Hockey Ops)
2010–11	72	48	16	4	4	268	159	104	1st Central	Lost Eastern Conference semi-final	Jesse Wallin	Chris Neiszner, Bruce Thoma	Jesse Wallin (VP Hockey Ops)
2011–12	72	32	34	1	5	204	231	70	5th Central	Out of playoffs	Jesse Wallin	Chris Neiszner, Bruce Thoma	Jesse Wallin
2012–13	72	39	26	5	2	208	204	85	3rd Central	Lost Eastern Conference semi-final	Jesse Wallin, Brent Sutter	Bryce Thoma, Jeff Truitt	Brent Sutter
2013–14	72	35	32	1	4	214	224	75	5th Central	Lost tiebreaker vs Prince Albert; Out of Playoffs	Brent Sutter	Steve O'Rourke, Jeff Truitt	Brent Sutter
2014–15	72	38	23	5	6	240	227	87	3rd Central	Lost Eastern Conference quarter-final	Brent Sutter	Steve O'Rourke, Jeff Truitt	Brent Sutter
2015–16	72	45	24	1	2	260	205	93	2nd Central	Lost Eastern Conference final Qualified for Memorial Cup as hosts Lost semi-final	Brent Sutter	Steve O'Rourke, Jeff Truitt	Brent Sutter
2016–17	72	30	29	9	4	239	258	73	3rd Central	Lost Eastern Conference quarter-final	Brent Sutter	Steve O'Rourke, Jeff Truitt, Pierre-Paul Lamoureux	Brent Sutter
2017–18	72	27	32	10	3	209	250	67	3rd Central	Lost Eastern Conference quarter-final	Brent Sutter	Steve O'Rourke, Jeff Truitt	Brent Sutter
2018–19	68	33	29	4	2	223	225	72	5th Central	Lost Eastern Conference quarter-final	Brent Sutter	Steve O'Rourke, Jeff Truitt	Brent Sutter
2019–20	63	24	33	3	3	181	250	54	5th Central	Cancelled due to the COVID-19 pandemic	Brent Sutter	Ryan Colville, Brad Flynn	Brent Sutter
2020–21	23	4	15	4	0	59	106	12	5th Central	No playoffs due to the COVID-19 pandemic	Brent Sutter	Ryan Colville, Brad Flynn	Brent Sutter
2021–22	68	45	19	2	2	264	188	94	2nd Central	Lost Eastern Conference semi-final	Steve Konowalchuk	Ryan Colville, Mike Egener	Brent Sutter
2022–23	68	43	19	3	3	248	189	92	1st Central	Lost Eastern Conference semi-final	Steve Konowalchuk	Ryan Colville, Mike Egener	Brent Sutter
2023–24	68	33	26	3	6	213	217	75	3rd Central	Lost Eastern Conference semi-final	Derrick Walser, David Struch	Clayton Beddoes, Mike Egener,	Brent Sutter
2024–25	68	26	34	6	2	174	244	60	5th Central	Did not qualify	David Struch	Ryan Colville, Mike Egener	Brent Sutter
2025–26	68	26	36	4	2	198	266	58	4th Central	Lost Eastern Conference quarter-final	Marc Habscheid	Ryan Colville, Mike Egener	Brent Sutter

== Championship history ==
- Memorial Cups: 2001
- Ed Chynoweth Cups: 2001
- conference championships: 2001, 2002, 2003
- Scotty Munro Memorial Trophies: 2000–01, 2001–02
- Division titles won: 2000–01, 2001–02, 2002–03, 2010–11, 2022–23

=== WHL finals ===
- 2000–01: Win, 4–1 vs Portland Winter Hawks
- 2001–02: Loss, 2–4 vs Kootenay Ice
- 2002–03: Loss, 2–4 vs Kelowna Rockets

=== Memorial Cup finals ===
- 2001: Win, 6–5 (OT) vs Val-d'Or Foreurs

== Players ==
=== Team captains ===
- 1992–93, Todd Johnson
- 1993–94, Ken Richardson
- 1994–95, Peter Leboutillier
- 1995–96, Terry Lindgren
- 1996–98, Jesse Wallin
- 1998–99, Brad Leeb
- 1999–2001, Jim Vandermeer
- 2001–02, Colby Armstrong
- 2004–05, Colin Fraser
- 2006–07, Brett Sutter
- 2007–08, Brandon Sutter
- 2009–11, Colin Archer
- 2011–12, Turner Elison
- 2013–14, Conner Bleackley
- 2014–15, Luke Philp
- 2014–16, Wyatt Johnson
- 2016–17, Adam Musil
- 2017–18, Grayson Pawlenchuk
- 2018–19, Reese Johnson
- 2019–2020, Dawson Barteaux
- 2020, Ethan Sakowich
- 2020–23, Jayden Grubbe
- 2023–24, Kai Uchacz
- 2024–25, Ollie Josephson
- 2025–26, Talon Brigley

=== NHL alumni ===
- Alexander Alexeyev
- Colby Armstrong
- Arron Asham
- Arshdeep Bains
- Ryan Bonni
- Mike Brown
- Jake DeBrusk
- Mathew Dumba
- Matt Ellison
- Turner Elson
- Martin Erat
- Landon Ferraro
- Haydn Fleury
- Colin Fraser
- Matt Fraser
- Byron Froese
- Michael Garnett
- Carsen Germyn
- Boyd Gordon
- Brandon Hagel
- Martin Hanzal
- Jay Henderson
- Reese Johnson
- Blair Jones
- Matt Keith
- Darcy Kuemper
- Peter Leboutillier
- Brad Leeb
- Brian Loney
- Ross Lupaschuk
- Doug Lynch
- Steve MacIntyre
- Josh Mahura
- Justin Mapletoft
- Masi Marjamaki
- Mike McBain
- Derek Meech
- Vladimir Mihalik
- Nelson Nogier
- Ryan Nugent-Hopkins
- Stephen Peat
- Lane Pederson
- John Persson
- Alex Petrovic
- Dion Phaneuf
- Luke Philp
- Kristian Reichel
- Craig Reichert
- James Reimer
- Terry Ryan
- Robert Schnabel
- Sean Selmser
- Shay Stephenson
- Austin Strand
- Brandon Sutter
- Brett Sutter
- Kai Uchacz
- Jim Vandermeer
- Pete Vandermeer
- Darren Van Impe
- Kris Versteeg
- Jesse Wallin
- Kyle Wanvig
- Cam Ward
- Lance Ward
- Roman Wick
- Jeff Woywitka
- Mikhail Yakubov
- B. J. Young

== Awards ==
=== WHL ===
Award	Topic	Player	Season
AirBC Trophy	Playoff MVP award	Shane Bendera	2001
WHL Plus-Minus Award	Best ± rating	Jim Vandermeer	2000–01
St. Clair Group Trophy	Marketing/public relations award	Pat Garrity	1996–97
St. Clair Group Trophy	Marketing/public relations award	Greg McConkey	2001–02
Doug Wickenheiser Memorial Trophy	Humanitarian of the year award	Jesse Wallin	1996–97
Doug Wickenheiser Memorial Trophy	Humanitarian of the year award	Jesse Wallin	1997–98
Doug Wickenheiser Memorial Trophy	Humanitarian of the year award	Jim Vandermeer	2000–01
Doug Wickenheiser Memorial Trophy	Humanitarian of the year award	Colin Fraser	2004–05
Lloyd Saunders Memorial Trophy	Executive of the year	Brent Sutter	2000–01
Dunc McCallum Memorial Trophy	Coach of the year	Brent Sutter	2000–01
Del Wilson Trophy	Top goaltender	Cam Ward	2001–02
Del Wilson Trophy	Top goaltender	Cam Ward	2003–04
Del Wilson Trophy	Top goaltender	Darcy Kuemper	2010–11
Del Wilson Trophy	Top goaltender	Patrik Bartosak	2012–13
Jim Piggott Memorial Trophy	Rookie of the year	Matt Ellison	2002–03
Jim Piggott Memorial Trophy	Rookie of the year	Ryan Nugent-Hopkins	2009–10
Jim Piggott Memorial Trophy	Rookie of the year	Mathew Dumba	2010–11
Bill Hunter Trophy	Top defenceman	Jeff Woywitka	2002–03
Bill Hunter Trophy	Top defenceman	Dion Phaneuf	2003–04
Bill Hunter Trophy	Top defenceman	Dion Phaneuf	2004–05
Bill Hunter Trophy	Top defenceman	Alex Petrovic	2011–12
Brad Hornung Trophy	Most sportsmanlike player	Boyd Gordon	2002–03
Bob Clarke Trophy	Top scorer	Justin Mapletoft	2000–01
Bob Clarke Trophy	Top scorer	Arshdeep Bains	2021–22
Four Broncos Memorial Trophy	Player of the year	Justin Mapletoft	2000–01
Four Broncos Memorial Trophy	Player of the year	Cam Ward	2003–04
Four Broncos Memorial Trophy	Player of the year	Darcy Kuemper	2010–11

=== CHL ===
Award	Player	Season
CHL Humanitarian of the Year	Jesse Wallin	1996–97
CHL Humanitarian of the Year	Jim Vandermeer	2000–01
CHL Humanitarian of the Year	Colin Fraser	2004–05
CHL Goaltender of the Year	Cam Ward	2003–04
CHL Goaltender of the Year	Darcy Kuemper	2010–11
CHL Goaltender of the Year	Patrik Bartosak	2012–13
CHL Rookie of the Year	Matt Ellison	2002–03
CHL Top Draft Prospect Award	Ryan Nugent-Hopkins	2010–11
Brian Kilrea Coach of the Year Award	Brent Sutter	2000–01
Stafford Smythe Memorial Trophy Memorial Cup MVP	Kyle Wanvig	2001

== See also ==
- List of ice hockey teams in Alberta
