= Justin Kelly (ice hockey) =

Canadian ice hockey player (born 1981)

- Born: March 17, 1981 (age 45) Abbotsford, British Columbia, Canada
- Height: 6 ft 4 in (193 cm)
- Weight: 185 lb (84 kg; 13 st 3 lb)
- Position: Right wing
- Shot: Right
- Played for: Lowell Lock Monsters; Springfield Falcons; EHC Black Wings Linz; Krefeld Pinguine; DEG Metro Stars
- NHL draft: Undrafted
- Playing career: 2002–2019

Justin Kelly (born March 17, 1981) is a Canadian former professional ice hockey player.

== Career ==
Kelly was born in Abbotsford, British Columbia. Kelly spent five seasons in the WHL, including three and a half with the Saskatoon Blades. In 2001-02, he tallied 86 points (39 goals, 47 assists) in 72 games for the Blades, which ranked him tenth in the league.

The 2002-03 season saw him skate for Swedish side IF Troja/Ljungby.

Upon his return from Europe, Kelly spent three years playing on five teams in three leagues, AHL, UHL and ECHL, before bringing his game back to Europe: In the course of the 2006-07 season, Kelly featured for three clubs: Eishockey-Club Olten of Switzerland, EHC Linz of Austria and Val Pusteria of Italy.

Kelly embarked on a three-year stint with German second-division club Bietigheim Steelers in 2008 and would make 129 DEL2 appearances in three seasons, amassing a total of 167 points (64 goals, 103 assists). In 2009-10, he received Player of the Year honors. That attracted the attention of German top-tier side Krefeld Pinguine, who signed Kelly for the 2010-11 Deutsche Eishockey Liga (DEL) season. He moved to fellow DEL club DEG Metro Stars for the following campaign, which was hampered by a knee injury sustained in October 2011.

The 2012-13 season saw him return to IF Troja/Ljungby of Sweden, where he had signed his first overseas contract ten years earlier. Kelly then signed a deal with the Ravensburg Towerstars for the 2013-14 campaign, which turned out to be a very successful one: He scored 32 goals on the season to go along with 58 assists for a shared top spot in the DEL2 scoring ranks.

Kelly then returned to the Bietigheim Steelers for the 2014-15 season and in June 2015, had his contract renewed for 2015-16. In the 2015-16 season, he led the DEL2 in scoring with 85 points and for the second time was named DEL2 Player of the Year.

== Career statistics ==
			Regular season					Playoffs
Season	Team	League	GP	G	A	Pts	PIM	GP	G	A	Pts	PIM
1997–98	Prince Albert Raiders	WHL	22	4	8	12	2	—	—	—	—	—
1997–98	Spokane Chiefs	WHL	13	0	0	0	0	—	—	—	—	—
1998–99	Saskatoon Blades	WHL	20	3	5	8	6	—	—	—	—	—
1998–99	Prince Albert Raiders	WHL	30	3	4	7	13	—	—	—	—	—
1999–00	Saskatoon Blades	WHL	54	6	11	17	36	11	0	1	1	9
2000–01	Saskatoon Blades	WHL	60	16	40	56	38	—	—	—	—	—
2001–02	Saskatoon Blades	WHL	72	39	47	86	47	7	4	2	6	4
2002–03	IF Troja-Ljungby	Allsvenskan	23	11	13	24	14	10	4	5	9	14
2003–04	Las Vegas Wranglers	ECHL	31	12	11	23	20	2	1	0	1	0
2003–04	Lowell Lock Monsters	AHL	34	4	5	9	10	—	—	—	—	—
2004–05	Adirondack Frostbite	UHL	57	23	42	65	29	6	2	4	6	2
2004–05	Springfield Falcons	AHL	4	2	1	3	0	—	—	—	—	—
2005–06	Johnstown Chiefs	ECHL	59	31	40	71	45	5	2	2	4	2
2005–06	Springfield Falcons	AHL	5	0	0	0	4	—	—	—	—	—
2006–07	EHC Olten	NLB	10	4	6	10	6	—	—	—	—	—
2006–07	EHC Linz	EBEL	11	6	9	15	10	—	—	—	—	—
2006–07	HC Pustertal Wölfe	Italy	22	12	19	31	20	8	5	10	15	10
2007–08	Bietigheim Steelers	DEL2	32	14	18	32	18	5	0	2	2	6
2008–09	Bietigheim Steelers	DEL2	48	26	37	63	40	12	8	8	16	4
2009–10	Bietigheim Steelers	DEL2	49	24	48	72	54	12	6	10	16	14
2010–11	Krefeld Pinguine	DEL	52	11	18	29	16	8	1	3	4	2
2011–12	DEG Metro Stars	DEL	14	0	2	2	4	7	1	1	2	18
2012–13	IF Troja-Ljungby	Allsvenskan	46	21	19	40	36	—	—	—	—	—
2013–14	Bietigheim Steelers	DEL2	54	32	58	90	46	7	3	3	6	8
2014–15	Bietigheim Steelers	DEL2	15	13	11	24	6	14	6	12	18	8
2015–16	Bietigheim Steelers	DEL2	52	34	51	85	53	11	4	15	19	4
AHL totals			43	6	6	12	14	—	—	—	—	—
DEL totals			66	11	20	31	20	15	2	4	6	20

== Awards and honours ==
Award	Year
WHL
East Second All-Star Team	2002
