= Wymark =

Wymark is a surname. Notable people with the surname include:

- Jane Wymark (born 1952), English actress
- Olwen Wymark (1932–2013), American playwright
- Patrick Wymark (1926–1970), born Patrick Carl Cheeseman, an English stage, film and television actor

== See also ==
- Wymark, Saskatchewan, hamlet in the Canadian province of Saskatchewan
- Wymer
