= 2001–02 WHL season =

Junior ice hockey season

- League: Western Hockey League
- Sport: Ice hockey
- Teams: 19

Regular season
- Scotty Munro Memorial Trophy: Red Deer Rebels (2)
- Season MVP: Dan Hamhuis (Prince George Cougars)
- Top scorer: Nathan Barrett (Lethbridge Hurricanes)

Playoffs
- Playoffs MVP: Duncan Milroy (Ice)
- Finals champions: Kootenay Ice (2)
- Runners-up: Red Deer Rebels

WHL seasons
- 2000–01 2002–03

2001–02 CHL season
- League: Canadian Hockey League
- Sport: Ice hockey
- Teams: 55

OHL

QMJHL

WHL

Memorial Cup
- Finals champions: Kootenay Ice (WHL) (1st title)
- Runners-up: Victoriaville Tigres (QMJHL)

The 2001–02 WHL season was the 36th season of the Western Hockey League (WHL). The league expanded to nineteen teams with the addition of the Vancouver Giants. The Red Deer Rebels won their second consecutive Scotty Munro Memorial Trophy for posting the best regular season record; the Rebels also returned to the championship series for a second straight here. However, the Kootenay Ice defeated the Rebels to win their second President's Cup and a berth in the 2002 Memorial Cup, where the Ice would win their first Memorial Cup title.

== League notes ==
- The Vancouver Giants joined the WHL as its 19th franchise. This precipitated a new standings format, with the league moving from three divisions to four, divided into Eastern and Western Conferences. The Swift Current Broncos moved from the East to the Central division, and the Kootenay Ice movied from the Central to the new B.C. Division—the old West Division was divided into the B.C. and U.S. Divisions.
- The top four teams in each division qualified for the playoffs, with the caveat that the 5th place team in the B.C. Division could qualify in place of the 4th place team in the U.S. Division if they had a better record.

== Regular season ==
Map of WHL, 2001–02 to 2002–03
East Division
Central Division
BC Division
US Division

=== Final standings ===
==== Eastern Conference ====
East Division
Pos	Team	Pld	W	L	T	OTL	GF	GA	Pts
1	x – Brandon Wheat Kings	72	43	4	23	2	261	210	92
2	x – Regina Pats	72	40	4	20	8	252	192	92
3	x – Moose Jaw Warriors	72	30	6	34	2	226	239	68
4	x – Saskatoon Blades	72	27	5	37	3	216	257	62
5	Prince Albert Raiders	72	26	2	41	3	234	324	57

x – qualified for playoffs

Central Division
Pos	Team	Pld	W	L	T	OTL	GF	GA	Pts
1	x – Red Deer Rebels	72	46	7	18	1	264	184	100
2	x – Swift Current Broncos	72	42	6	17	7	274	218	97
3	x – Calgary Hitmen	72	33	5	33	1	271	281	72
4	x – Lethbridge Hurricanes	72	33	6	33	0	266	247	72
5	Medicine Hat Tigers	72	30	4	36	2	277	316	66

x – qualified for playoffs

==== Western Conference ====
B.C. Division
Pos	Team	Pld	W	L	T	OTL	GF	GA	Pts
1	x – Kamloops Blazers	72	38	5	25	4	263	230	85
2	x – Kootenay Ice	72	38	7	27	0	276	223	83
3	x – Prince George Cougars	72	34	9	27	2	244	215	79
4	x – Kelowna Rockets	72	31	10	26	5	257	232	77
5	Vancouver Giants	72	13	6	49	4	198	365	36

x – qualified for playoffs

U.S. Division
Pos	Team	Pld	W	L	T	OTL	GF	GA	Pts
1	x – Portland Winter Hawks	72	36	5	25	6	269	243	83
2	x – Spokane Chiefs	72	33	11	25	3	223	206	80
3	x – Tri-City Americans	72	31	10	31	0	260	271	72
4	x – Seattle Thunderbirds	72	21	6	40	5	235	313	53

x – qualified for playoffs

=== Scoring leaders ===
Note: GP = Games played; G = Goals; A = Assists; Pts = Points; PIM = Penalties in minutes

Player	Team	GP	G	A	Pts	PIM
Nathan Barrett	Lethbridge Hurricanes	72	45	62	107	100
Joffrey Lupul	Medicine Hat Tigers	72	56	50	106	95
Eric Johansson	Tri-City Americans	69	44	59	103	73
Tyler Beechey	Kootenay/Calgary	70	44	55	99	104
Josef Balej	Portland Winter Hawks	65	51	41	92	52
Jeremy Jackson	Vancouver/Lethbridge	71	38	53	91	91
Mikhail Yakubov	Red Deer Rebels	71	32	57	89	54
Josh Olson	Portland Winter Hawks	72	40	48	88	85
Duncan Milroy	Swift Current/Kootenay	64	45	42	87	44
Justin Kelly	Saskatoon Blades	72	39	47	86	47

=== Goaltending leaders ===
Note: GP = Games played; Min = Minutes played; W = Wins; L = Losses; T = Ties; GA = Goals against; SO = Total shutouts; SV% = Save percentage; GAA = Goals against average

Player	Team	GP	Min	W	L	T	GA	SO	SV%	GAA
Cam Ward	Red Deer Rebels	46	2695	30	11	4	102	1	.911	2.27
Josh Harding	Regina Pats	42	3289	27	13	1	95	4	.906	2.39
Shane Bendera	Red Deer/Kelowna	50	3030	24	15	11	125	1	.912	2.47
Barry Brust	Spokane Chiefs	60	3542	28	21	10	152	1	.912	2.57
Billy Thompson	Prince George Cougars	42	2378	20	17	2	108	2	.913	2.72

== 2002 WHL Playoffs ==
Conference Quarter-finals	Conference Semi-finals
E1	Brandon	4
E4	Saskatoon	3
C1	Red Deer	4
E3	Moose Jaw	2
E2	Regina	2
E3	Moose Jaw	4
Eastern
C1	Red Deer	4
C4	Lethbridge	0
E1	Brandon	4
C2	Swift Current	1
C2	Swift Current	4
C3	Calgary	3
B1	Kamloops	0
B4	Kelowna	4
B2	Kootenay	4
U4	Seattle	0
B2	Kootenay	4
B3	Prince George	3
Western
U1	Portland	3
U4	Seattle	4
U2	Spokane	2
B4	Kelowna	4
U2	Spokane	4
U3	Tri-City	1

Conference Finals
E1	Brandon	3
C1	Red Deer	4
B2	Kootenay	4
B4	Kelowna	1

WHL Championship
C1	Red Deer	2
B2	Kootenay Ice	4

=== Conference quarterfinals ===
==== Eastern Conference ====
Brandon vs. Saskatoon
Date	Away	Home	
March 23	Brandon 1	2 Saskatoon	OT
March 24	Brandon 2	0 Saskatoon	
March 26	Saskatoon 1	3 Brandon	
March 27	Saskatoon 2	1 Brandon	2OT
March 31	Brandon 2	3 Saskatoon	OT
April 2	Saskatoon 1	4 Brandon	
April 3	Saskatoon 1	2 Brandon	
Brandon wins series 4–3

Red Deer vs. Lethbridge
Date	Away	Home
March 22	Lethbridge 2	4 Red Deer
March 23	Lethbridge 3	5 Red Deer
March 26	Red Deer 5	2 Lethbridge
March 27	Red Deer 3	2 Lethbridge
Red Deer wins series 4–0

Regina vs. Moose Jaw
Date	Away	Home	
March 22	Moose Jaw 3	2 Regina	OT
March 23	Moose Jaw 3	5 Regina	
March 26	Regina 2	1 Moose Jaw	
March 27	Regina 1	3 Moose Jaw	
March 29	Moose Jaw 2	1 Regina	
March 31	Regina 2	5 Moose Jaw	
Moose Jaw wins series 4–2

Swift Current vs. Calgary
Date	Away	Home
March 22	Calgary 4	2 Swift Current
March 23	Calgary 2	4 Swift Current
March 26	Swift Current 5	1 Calgary
March 27	Swift Current 1	3 Calgary
March 29	Calgary 4	5 Swift Current
March 31	Swift Current 2	5 Calgary
April 2	Calgary 1	3 Swift Current
Swift Current wins series 4–3

==== Western Conference ====
Kamloops vs. Kelowna
Date	Away	Home
March 22	Kelowna 4	1 Kamloops
March 23	Kelowna 3	0 Kamloops
March 27	Kamloops 2	4 Kelowna
March 28	Kamloops 1	3 Kelowna
Kelowna wins series 4–0

Portland vs. Seattle
Date	Away	Home
March 22	Seattle 3	4 Portland
March 23	Seattle 6	2 Portland
March 26	Portland 2	3 Seattle
March 28	Portland 3	2 Seattle
March 29	Seattle 1	0 Portland
March 30	Portland 4	0 Seattle
April 2	Seattle 3	2 Portland
Seattle wins series 4–3

Kootenay vs. Prince George
Date	Away	Home
March 22	Prince George 4	1 Kootenay
March 23	Prince George 3	1 Kootenay
March 26	Kootenay 6	0 Prince George
March 27	Kootenay 4	2 Prince George
March 29	Kootenay 5	3 Prince George
April 1	Prince George 6	3 Kootenay
April 2	Prince George 1	5 Kootenay
Kootenay wins series 4–3

Spokane vs. Tri-City
Date	Away	Home	
March 22	Tri-City 1	4 Spokane	
March 23	Tri-City 3	7 Spokane	
March 27	Spokane 2	1 Tri-City	
March 29	Spokane 2	3 Tri-City	OT
March 30	Tri-City 1	Spokane 2	OT
Spokane wins series 4–1

=== Conference semifinals ===
Eastern Conference

Red Deer vs. Moose Jaw
Date	Away	Home	
April 5	Moose Jaw 4	0 Red Deer	
April 6	Moose Jaw 3	5 Red Deer	
April 9	Red Deer 2	3 Moose Jaw	OT
April 10	Red Deer 2	1 Moose Jaw	OT
April 12	Moose Jaw 0	6 Red Deer	
April 14	Red Deer 4	2 Moose Jaw	
Red Deer wins series 4–2

Swift Current vs. Brandon
Date	Away	Home	
April 5	Brandon 2	3 Swift Current	
April 6	Brandon 3	2 Swift Current	OT
April 9	Swift Current 1	4 Brandon	
April 10	Swift Current 3	4 Brandon	OT
April 12	Brandon 4	3 Swift Current	
Brandon wins series 4–1

Western Conference

Kootenay vs Seattle
Date	Away	Home
April 5	Seattle 1	3 Kootenay
April 6	Seattle 1	7 Kootenay
April 9	Kootenay 5	2 Seattle
April 11	Kootenay 5	3 Seattle
Kootenay wins series 4–0

Spokane vs. Kelowna
Date	Away	Home	
April 5	Kelowna 2	3 Spokane	
April 7	Spokane 3	2 Kelowna	OT
April 8	Spokane 1	2 Kelowna	
April 10	Kelowna 8	2 Spokane	
April 11	Kelowna 2	1 Spokane	2OT
April 13	Spokane 0	2 Kelowna	
Kelowna wins series 4–2

=== Conference finals ===
Eastern Conference

Red Deer vs. Brandon
Date	Away	Home	
April 19	Brandon 2	1 Red Deer	OT
April 20	Brandon 2	4 Red Deer	
April 23	Red Deer 4	5 Brandon	2OT
April 24	Red Deer 2	5 Brandon	
April 26	Brandon 0	4 Red Deer	
April 28	Red Deer 3	2 Brandon	2OT
April 30	Brandon 2	5 Red Deer	
Red Deer wins series 4–3

Western Conference

Kootenay vs. Kelowna
Date	Away	Home
April 19	Kelowna 2	3 Kootenay
April 20	Kelowna 4	5 Kootenay
April 23	Kootenay 1	5 Kelowna
April 24	Kootenay 4	2 Kelowna
April 26	Kelowna 0	3 Kootenay
Kootenay wins series 4–1

=== WHL Championship ===
Red Deer vs. Kootenay
Date	Away	Home	
May 3	Kootenay 2	1 Red Deer	OT
May 4	Kootenay 1	2 Red Deer	
May 7	Red Deer 2	3 Kootenay	OT
May 8	Red Deer 3	2 Kootenay	
May 11	Kootenay 4	3 Red Deer	
May 13	Red Deer 2	3 Kootenay	2OT
Kootenay wins series 4–2

== All-Star games ==
On January 24, the WHL Eastern All-Stars were defeated by the OHL Western All-Stars 7–2 at Red Deer, Alberta before a crowd of 6,259.

On February 6, the WHL Western All-Stars defeated the QMJHL Dilio All-Stars 9–4 at Rimouski, Quebec before a crowd of 4,762.

== WHL awards ==
Four Broncos Memorial Trophy (Player of the Year): Dan Hamhuis, Prince George Cougars
Daryl K. (Doc) Seaman Trophy (Scholastic Player of the Year): Tyler Metcalfe, Seattle Thunderbirds
Scholastic Team of the Year: Portland Winterhawks
Bob Clarke Trophy (Top scorer): Nathan Barrett, Lethbridge Hurricanes
Brad Hornung Trophy (Most Sportsmanlike Player): Ian White, Swift Current Broncos
Bill Hunter Trophy (Top Defenseman): Dan Hamhuis, Prince George Cougars
Jim Piggott Memorial Trophy (Rookie of the Year): Braydon Coburn, Portland Winter Hawks
Del Wilson Trophy (Top Goaltender): Cam Ward, Red Deer Rebels
Dunc McCallum Memorial Trophy (Coach of the Year): Bob Lowes, Regina Pats
Lloyd Saunders Memorial Trophy (Executive of the Year): Brad McEwan, Swift Current Broncos
Scotty Munro Memorial Trophy (Best regular season record): Red Deer Rebels
Allen Paradice Memorial Trophy (Top Official): Kevin Acheson
St. Clair Group Trophy (Marketing/Public Relations Award): Greg McConkey, Red Deer Rebels
Doug Wickenheiser Memorial Trophy (Humanitarian of the Year): Brandin Cote, Spokane Chiefs
WHL Plus-Minus Award: Matt Hubbauer, Regina Pats
WHL Playoff Most Valuable Player: Duncan Milroy, Kootenay Ice

== All-Star teams ==
Eastern Conference
	First Team		Second Team	
Goal	Cam Ward	Red Deer Rebels	Josh Harding	Regina Pats
Defense	Filip Novak	Regina Pats	Ian White	Swift Current Broncos
Defense	Jay Bouwmeester	Medicine Hat Tigers	Jeff Woywitka	Red Deer Rebels
Forward	Joffrey Lupul	Medicine Hat Tigers	Matt Hubbauer	Regina Pats
Forward	Nathan Barrett	Lethbridge Hurricanes	Mikhail Yakubov	Red Deer Rebels
Forward	Tyler Beechey	Calgary Hitmen	Justin Kelly	Saskatoon Blades
Western Conference
	First Team		Second Team	
Goal	Barry Brust	Spokane Chiefs	Shane Bendera	Kelowna Rockets
Defense	Dan Hamhuis	Prince George Cougars	Craig Weller	Kootenay Ice
Defense	Kurt Sauer	Spokane Chiefs	Jesse Ferguson	Kelowna Rockets
Forward	Jarret Stoll	Kootenay Ice	Eric Johansson	Tri-City Americans
Forward	Jozef Balej	Portland Winter Hawks	Scottie Upshall	Kamloops Blazers
Forward	Jared Aulin	Kamloops Blazers	Marek Svatos	Kootenay Ice

- source: Western Hockey League press release

== See also ==
- 2002 NHL entry draft
- 2001 in sports
- 2002 in sports

Preceded by 2000–01 WHL season	WHL seasons	Succeeded by 2002–03 WHL season
