= Rick Carriere =

Canadian ice hockey player

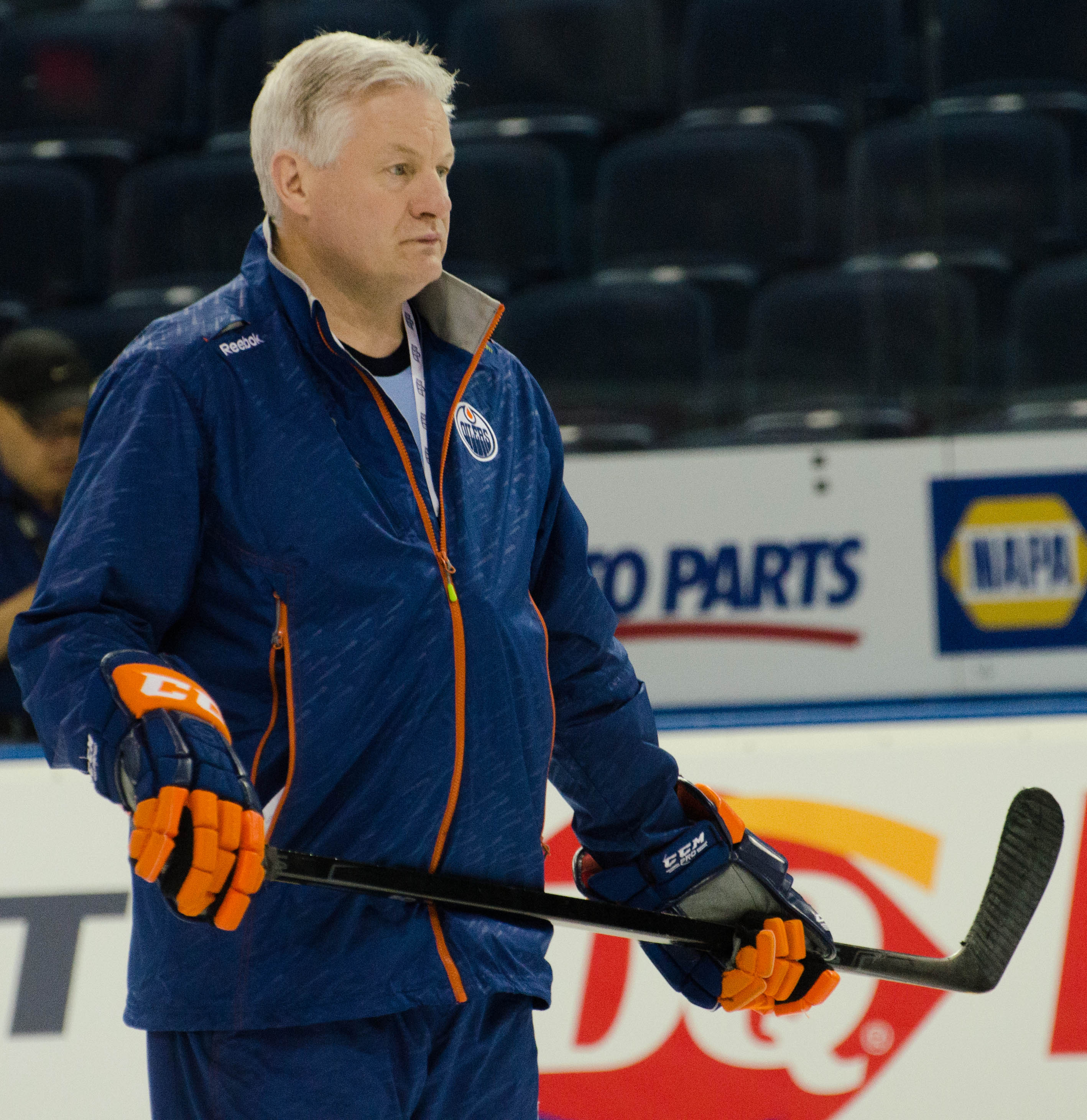
- Carriere in 2015
- Born: March 14, 1959 (age 67) Edmonton, Alberta, Canada
- Height: 6 ft 2 in (188 cm)
- Weight: 197 lb (89 kg; 14 st 1 lb)
- Position: Defence
- Shot: Left
- Played for: EHL; Hampton Aces; Johnstown Red Wings
- NHL draft: Undrafted
- Playing career: 1979–1980

Rick Carriere (born March 14, 1959) is a Canadian former professional ice hockey defenceman. He was the Senior Director of Player Development for the Edmonton Oilers of the National Hockey League (NHL).

Carriere played professionally during the 1979-80 season with the Hampton Aces and Johnstown Red Wings of the Eastern Hockey League, scoring one goal and four assists, with 34 penalty minutes, in 46 games played.

In 1981, Carriere enrolled with the University of Alberta where he played four years with the Alberta Golden Bears. After graduating with a Bachelor of Education, he began his coaching career in 1985 as an assistant coach with the Northern Alberta Institute of Technology hockey program, becoming head coach in 1989.

Carriere was an assistant coach with the Saint John Flames of the American Hockey League from 1992 to 1994, before moving to the Western Hockey League where he was the head coach of the Red Deer Rebels from 1994 to 1996, and of the Medicine Hat Tigers from 1996 until 2000 when he became the team's General Manager. He remained GM until 2004, and stayed with the Tigers as a scout until 2012.

He is currently a teacher at Vimy Ridge Academy in Edmonton Alberta

On June 28, 2012, Carriere was named the Senior Director of Player Development for the Edmonton Oilers of the National Hockey League.
