= 2001 World Junior Ice Hockey Championships rosters =

Below are the rosters for teams competing in the 2001 World Junior Ice Hockey Championships.

== Group A ==
=== Czech Republic ===
- Head coach: (Czech Republic) Jaroslav Holík

Pos.	No.	Player	Team	NHL Rights
GK	1	Lukáš Čučela	(Czech Republic) HC Vítkovice	
GK	30	Tomáš Duba	(Czech Republic) HC Sparta Praha	
D	3	Libor Ustrnul	(United States) Plymouth Whalers	Atlanta Thrashers
D	4	David Pojkar	(Czech Republic) HC Slavia Praha	
D	5	Jakub Grof	(Czech Republic) HC Becherovka Karlovy Vary	
D	6	Jan Výtisk	(Czech Republic) HC Vítkovice	
D	7	David Nosek	(Czech Republic) HC Oceláři Třinec	
D	8	Jakub Čutta	(Canada) Swift Current Broncos	Washington Capitals
D	13	Jan Chotěbořský	(Czech Republic) HC Keramika Plzeň	
D	16	Rostislav Klesla	(Canada) Brampton Battalion	Columbus Blue Jackets
F	9	Patrik Moskal	(Czech Republic) HC Oceláři Třinec	
F	10	Ivan Rachůnek	(Czech Republic) HC Continental Zlín	Tampa Bay Lightning
F	11	Zdeněk Blatný	(Canada) Kootenay Ice	Atlanta Thrashers
F	14	Tomáš Plekanec	(Czech Republic) HC Vagnerplast Kladno	
F	15	Marek Tomica	(Czech Republic) HC Slavia Praha	
F	17	Ladislav Vlček	(Czech Republic) HC Vagnerplast Kladno	Dallas Stars
F	19	Václav Nedorost	(Czech Republic) HC České Budějovice	Colorado Avalanche
F	21	Pavel Brendl	(Canada) Calgary Hitmen	New York Rangers
F	22	Martin Erat	(Canada) Saskatoon Blades	Nashville Predators
F	23	Lukáš Havel	(Canada) Brampton Battalion	
F	25	Michal Sivek	(Czech Republic) HC Sparta Praha	Washington Capitals
F	26	Radim Vrbata	(Canada) Shawinigan Cataractes	Colorado Avalanche

=== United States ===
- Head coach: (United States) Keith Allain

Pos.	No.	Player	Team	NHL Rights
GK	1	Craig Kowalski	(United States) Northern Michigan University	Carolina Hurricanes
GK	29	Rick DiPietro	(United States) New York Islanders	New York Islanders
D	3	Ron Hainsey	(United States) University of Massachusetts Lowell	Montreal Canadiens
D	4	Tim Gleason	(Canada) Windsor Spitfires	
D	5	J. D. Forrest	(United States) Boston College	Carolina Hurricanes
D	6	Mike Komisarek	(United States) University of Michigan	
D	7	David Hale	(United States) University of North Dakota	New Jersey Devils
D	27	Paul Martin	(United States) University of Minnesota	New Jersey Devils
D	28	Freddy Meyer	(United States) Boston University	
F	9	Connor Dunlop	(United States) University of Notre Dame	
F	10	Marc Cavosie	(United States) Rensselaer Polytechnic Institute	Minnesota Wild
F	11	John Sabo	(United States) Boston University	
F	12	Kris Vernarsky	(United States) Plymouth Whalers	Toronto Maple Leafs
F	14	Dave Steckel	(United States) Ohio State University	
F	15	Damian Surma	(United States) Plymouth Whalers	Carolina Hurricanes
F	18	Rob Globke	(United States) University of Notre Dame	
F	19	Andy Hilbert	(United States) University of Michigan	Boston Bruins
F	20	R. J. Umberger	(United States) Ohio State University	
F	21	Troy Riddle	(United States) University of Minnesota	St. Louis Blues
F	23	Jeff Taffe	(United States) University of Minnesota	St. Louis Blues
F	24	Jon DiSalvatore	(United States) Providence College	San Jose Sharks
F	26	Brett Nowak	(United States) Harvard University	Boston Bruins

=== Sweden ===
- Head coach: (Sweden) Bo Lennartsson

Pos.	No.	Player	Team	NHL Rights
GK	1	Jimmy Danielsson	(Sweden) Leksands IF	
GK	30	Henrik Lundqvist	(Sweden) Västra Frölunda HC	New York Rangers
D	3	Daniel Josefsson	(Sweden) Tranås AIF	
D	4	Niklas Kronwall	(Sweden) Djurgårdens IF	Detroit Red Wings
D	5	David Bornhammar	(Sweden) AIK IF	Washington Capitals
D	7	Andreas Holmqvist	(Sweden) Hammarby Hockey	
D	17	Daniel Ljungkvist	(Sweden) HV71	
D	22	Magnus Hedlund	(Sweden) Mora IK	
D	25	Jonas Lennartsson	(Sweden) Mora IK	
F	10	Jonas Nordqvist	(Sweden) Leksands IF	Chicago Blackhawks
F	11	Martin Samuelsson	(Sweden) Hammarby Hockey	Boston Bruins
F	12	Johan Reineck	(Sweden) Tyringe SoSS	
F	14	Pär Bäcker	(Sweden) Bofors IK	Detroit Red Wings
F	15	Jari Tolsa	(Sweden) Västra Frölunda HC	Detroit Red Wings
F	16	Fredrik Sundin	(Sweden) Bofors IK	
F	18	Mattias Wennerberg	(Sweden) Bodens IK	Chicago Blackhawks
F	20	Mathias Månsson	(Sweden) Modo Hockey	
F	21	Björn Melin	(Sweden) HV71	New York Islanders
F	23	Jonas Andersson	(United States) Milwaukee Admirals	Nashville Predators
F	24	Fredrik Sjöström	(Sweden) Västra Frölunda HC	
F	28	Daniel Widing	(Sweden) Leksands IF	Nashville Predators
F	29	Tim Eriksson	(Sweden) Hammarby Hockey	Los Angeles Kings

=== Slovakia ===
- Head coach: (Slovakia) Ján Selvek

Pos.	No.	Player	Team	NHL Rights
GK	1	Ľuboš Pisár	(Slovakia) MHC Martin	
GK	25	Peter Budaj	(Canada) Toronto St. Michael's Majors	
D	3	Ladislav Gábriš	(Slovakia) HK Dukla Trenčín	
D	4	Tomáš Slovák	(Slovakia) HC Košice	
D	5	Alexander Valentín	(Slovakia) HC Košice	
D	11	Tomáš Starosta	(Slovakia) HK Dukla Trenčín	
D	23	Tomáš Malec	(Canada) Rimouski Océanic	
D	26	Miroslav Ďurák	(Canada) Sherbrooke Castors	Nashville Predators
D	28	Ľuboš Velebný	(United States) Waterloo Black Hawks	Toronto Maple Leafs
D	29	René Vydarený	(United States) Kansas City Blades	Vancouver Canucks
F	6	Peter Szabo	(United States) Danville Wings	
F	8	Milan Bartovič	(Canada) Brandon Wheat Kings	Buffalo Sabres
F	9	Jozef Balej	(United States) Portland Winterhawks	Montreal Canadiens
F	10	Roman Tvrdoň	(United States) Spokane Chiefs	Washington Capitals
F	12	Lukáš Hvila	(Slovakia) HK SKP Poprad	
F	13	Tomáš Surový	(Slovakia) HK SKP Poprad	
F	14	Miroslav Kristín	(Slovakia) MsHK Žilina	
F	16	Martin Drotár	(Slovakia) HC Košice	
F	19	Marcel Hossa	(United States) Portland Winterhawks	Montreal Canadiens
F	22	Tomáš Kopecký	(Canada) Lethbridge Hurricanes	Detroit Red Wings
F	24	Tomáš Škvaridlo	(Canada) Kingston Frontenacs	Pittsburgh Penguins
F	27	Milan Dubec	(Slovakia) MsHK Žilina	

=== Kazakhstan ===
- Head coach: (Kazakhstan) Sergei Starygin

Pos.	No.	Player	Team	NHL Rights
GK	1	Roman Medvedev	(Kazakhstan) Kazzinc-Torpedo	
GK	20	Alexander Kolyuzhny	(Kazakhstan) Kazzinc-Torpedo	
D	2	Alexei Vasilchenko	(Kazakhstan) Kazzinc-Torpedo	
D	3	Yevgeni Fadeyev	(Kazakhstan) Kazzinc-Torpedo	
D	5	Dmitri Babich	(Kazakhstan) Kazzinc-Torpedo	
D	8	Sergei Litvinov	(Kazakhstan) Kazzinc-Torpedo	
D	12	Anatoli Fokin	(Kazakhstan) Kazzinc-Torpedo	
D	13	Pavel Serdyukov	(Russia) Rubin Tyumen	
D	19	Yevgeni Mazunin	(Kazakhstan) Kazzinc-Torpedo	
D	26	Pavel Filipenko	(Russia) Severstal Cherepovets	
F	7	Konstantin Vasilyev	(Kazakhstan) Kazzinc-Torpedo	
F	10	Roman Kozlov	(Kazakhstan) Kazzinc-Torpedo	
F	11	Alexander Semyonov	(Kazakhstan) Kazzinc-Torpedo	
F	16	Roman Azanov	(Russia) Severstal Cherepovets	
F	18	Mikhail Yuriev	(Kazakhstan) Kazzinc-Torpedo	
F	22	Vadim Sozinov	(Canada) Ottawa 67's	Toronto Maple Leafs
F	23	Andrei Ogorodnikov	(Kazakhstan) Kazzinc-Torpedo	
F	24	Yevgeni Tanygin	(Kazakhstan) Kazzinc-Torpedo	
F	27	Sergei Korobeinikov	(Kazakhstan) Kazzinc-Torpedo	
F	28	Viktor Alexandrov	(Kazakhstan) Kazzinc-Torpedo	
F	29	Andrei Spiridonov	(Kazakhstan) Kazzinc-Torpedo	
F	30	Denis Falfutdinov	(Kazakhstan) Kazzinc-Torpedo	

== Group B ==
=== Finland ===
- Head coach: (Finland) Kari Jalonen

Pos.	No.	Player	Team	NHL Rights
GK	1	Kari Lehtonen	(Finland) Jokerit	
GK	30	Ari Ahonen	(Finland) HIFK	New Jersey Devils
D	3	Markku Paukkunen	(Finland) JYP Jyväskylä	
D	4	Harri Tikkanen	(Finland) SaiPa	
D	5	Lasse Kukkonen	(Finland) Oulun Kärpät	
D	7	Janne Niskala	(Finland) Lukko	
D	8	Tuukka Mäntylä	(Finland) Tappara	
D	20	Olli Malmivaara	(Finland) Jokerit	Chicago Blackhawks
D	21	Tero Määttä	(Finland) Espoo Blues	San Jose Sharks
F	9	Mikko Koivu	(Finland) HC TPS	
F	10	Ville Hämäläinen	(Finland) SaiPa	
F	12	Sami Venäläinen	(Finland) Tappara	Phoenix Coyotes
F	13	Miro Laitinen	(Finland) Tappara	
F	14	Toni Mustonen	(Finland) KJT Haukat	
F	15	Juha-Pekka Hytönen	(Finland) JYP Jyväskylä	
F	16	Toni Koivisto	(Finland) Lukko	
F	17	Tuomas Pihlman	(Finland) JYP Jyväskylä	
F	18	Tony Salmelainen	(Finland) HIFK	Edmonton Oilers
F	19	Teemu Sainomaa	(Finland) Jokerit	Ottawa Senators
F	22	Jani Rita	(Finland) Jokerit	Edmonton Oilers
F	25	Jouni Kulonen	(Finland) JYP Jyväskylä	
F	26	Tuomo Ruutu	(Finland) Jokerit	

=== Russia ===
- Head coach: (Russia) Petr Vorobiev

Pos.	No.	Player	Team	NHL Rights
GK	20	Alexei Petrov	(Russia) HC Sibir Novosibirsk	
GK	30	Andrei Medvedev	(Russia) HC Spartak Moscow	
D	3	Rail Rozakov	(Russia) Metallurg Novokuznetsk	Calgary Flames
D	4	Anton Volchenkov	(Russia) Krylya Sovetov Moscow	Ottawa Senators
D	6	Denis Grebeshkov	(Russia) Lokomotiv Yaroslavl	
D	7	Andrei Shefer	(Russia) Severstal Cherepovets	Los Angeles Kings
D	8	Denis Denisov	(Russia) HC CSKA Moscow	Buffalo Sabres
D	10	Alexander Seluyanov	(Russia) Salavat Yulaev Ufa	Detroit Red Wings
D	11	Vladislav Korneyev	(Russia) Severstal Cherepovets	
D	29	Alexander Barkunov	(Russia) Lokomotiv Yaroslavl	Chicago Blackhawks
F	9	Pavel Duma	(Russia) HC Neftekhimik Nizhnekamsk	Vancouver Canucks
F	13	Ivan Nepryaev	(Russia) Lokomotiv Yaroslavl	Washington Capitals
F	14	Yevgeni Muratov	(Russia) HC Neftekhimik Nizhnekamsk	Edmonton Oilers
F	15	Alexander Buturlin	(Canada) Sarnia Sting	Montreal Canadiens
F	16	Alexander Svitov	(Russia) Avangard Omsk	
F	17	Ilya Kovalchuk	(Russia) HC Spartak Moscow	
F	18	Pavel Vorobyev	(Russia) Lokomotiv Yaroslavl	Chicago Blackhawks
F	22	Alexander Chagodayev	(Russia) Lokomotiv Yaroslavl	Mighty Ducks of Anaheim
F	23	Yegor Shastin	(Russia) Avangard Omsk	
F	25	Stanislav Chistov	(Russia) Avangard Omsk	
F	26	Mikhail Yakubov	(Russia) HC Lada Togliatti	Chicago Blackhawks
F	27	Artyom Chernov	(Russia) Metallurg Novokuznetsk	Dallas Stars

=== Canada ===
- Head coach: (Canada) Stan Butler

Pos.	No.	Player	Team	NHL Rights
GK	30	Maxime Ouellet	(Canada) Rouyn-Noranda Huskies	Philadelphia Flyers
GK	33	Alex Auld	(Canada) North Bay Centennials	Florida Panthers
D	2	Barret Jackman	(Canada) Regina Pats	St. Louis Blues
D	3	Nick Schultz	(Canada) Prince Albert Raiders	Minnesota Wild
D	4	Jay Bouwmeester	(Canada) Medicine Hat Tigers	
D	5	Dan Hamhuis	(Canada) Prince George Cougars	
D	7	Steve McCarthy	(United States) Chicago Blackhawks	Chicago Blackhawks
D	23	Jay Harrison	(Canada) Brampton Battalion	
D	27	Mark Popovic	(Canada) Toronto St. Michael's Majors	
F	9	Jason Spezza	(Canada) Windsor Spitfires	
F	10	Mike Zigomanis	(Canada) Kingston Frontenacs	Buffalo Sabres
F	12	David Morisset	(United States) Seattle Thunderbirds	St. Louis Blues
F	15	Dany Heatley	(United States) University of Wisconsin	Atlanta Thrashers
F	16	Derek MacKenzie	(Canada) Sudbury Wolves	Atlanta Thrashers
F	17	Jamie Lundmark	(United States) Seattle Thunderbirds	New York Rangers
F	19	Jarret Stoll	(Canada) Kootenay Ice	Calgary Flames
F	21	Steve Ott	(Canada) Windsor Spitfires	Dallas Stars
F	22	Jason Jaspers	(Canada) Sudbury Wolves	Phoenix Coyotes
F	25	Brandon Reid	(Canada) Val-d'Or Foreurs	Vancouver Canucks
F	28	Raffi Torres	(Canada) Brampton Battalion	New York Islanders
F	29	Michael Cammalleri	(United States) University of Michigan	
F	34	Brad Boyes	(United States) Erie Otters	Toronto Maple Leafs

=== Switzerland ===
- Head coach: (Switzerland) Jakob Kölliker

Pos.	No.	Player	Team	NHL Rights
GK	1	Pasquale Sievert	(Switzerland) HC Lugano	
GK	30	Martin Zerzuben	(Switzerland) SCL Tigers	
D	2	Beat Gerber	(Switzerland) SCL Tigers	
D	3	Timo Helbling	(Canada) Windsor Spitfires	Nashville Predators
D	5	Severin Blindenbacher	(Switzerland) EHC Kloten	
D	6	David Jobin	(Switzerland) SC Bern	
D	8	Steve Hirschi	(Switzerland) SCL Tigers	
D	11	Beat Forster	(Switzerland) HC Davos	
D	15	Fabian Stephan	(Switzerland) SC Bern	
F	7	Thibaut Monnet	(Switzerland) HC La Chaux-de-Fonds	
F	9	Mark Heberlein	(Switzerland) HC Davos	
F	10	Fabian Sutter	(Switzerland) SC Bern	
F	14	Claudio Neff	(Switzerland) HC Davos	
F	17	Patrick Aeberli	(Switzerland) SC Rapperswil-Jona	
F	18	Stefan Niggli	(Switzerland) EV Zug	
F	19	Paolo Duca	(Switzerland) HC Ambrì-Piotta	
F	21	Andreas Camenzind	(Switzerland) HC Davos	
F	22	Sébastien Reuille	(Switzerland) EHC Kloten	
F	23	Thomas Nüssli	(Switzerland) EV Zug	
F	24	Duri Camichel	(Switzerland) EV Zug	
F	27	Sven Helfenstein	(Switzerland) SC Bern	New York Rangers
F	28	Vitali Lakhmatov	(Switzerland) HC Ambrì-Piotta	

=== Belarus ===
- Head coach: (Belarus) Vladimir Melenchuk

Pos.	No.	Player	Team	NHL Rights
GK	1	Dmitri Poshelyuk	(Belarus) Polimir Novopolotsk	
GK	22	Vitali Aristov	(Belarus) Yunost Minsk	
D	2	Valentin Ebert	(Belarus) HK Mogilev	
D	4	Andrei Bashko	(Belarus) HK Mogilev	
D	5	Ruslan Sharapa	(Belarus) HK Mogilev	
D	7	Maxim Shimansky	(Russia) Severstal Cherepovets	
D	23	Sergei Paklin	(Belarus) Yunost Minsk	
D	24	Yevgeni Makarov	(Belarus) HK Mogilev	
D	26	Andrei Skripalyov	(Russia) Severstal Cherepovets	
F	8	Andrei Tikhon	(Belarus) Polimir Novopolotsk	
F	9	Yaroslav Chupris	(Belarus) Yunost Minsk	
F	10	Andrei Moroz	(Belarus) Polimir Novopolotsk	
F	11	Alexander Kulakov	(Belarus) Yunost Minsk	
F	12	Mikhail Klimin	(Belarus) Yunost Minsk	
F	15	Konstantin Nemirko	(Belarus) Yunost Minsk	
F	16	Dmitri Duben	(Belarus) HK Mogilev	
F	17	Artyom Senkevich	(Belarus) HK Mogilev	
F	18	Dmitri Meleshko	(Belarus) HK Mogilev	
F	19	Vitali Klimenkov	(Belarus) Yunost Minsk	
F	20	Konstantin Zakharov	(Belarus) Yunost Minsk	
F	21	Andrei Kostitsyn	(Belarus) Polimir Novopolotsk	
F	28	Konstantin Koltsov	(Russia) Ak Bars Kazan	Pittsburgh Penguins
