= Ireland men's national junior ice hockey team =

Ireland
- The Irish badge features the golden clàrsach on a green background which is also used on the Green harp flag, one of the flags used to represent Ireland.
- Association: Irish Ice Hockey Association
- General manager: Cliff Saunders
- Head coach: Peter Lalor
- Assistants: Dan Baillie; Keith Dalk
- Most points: Ross Cronin (1)
- IIHF code: IRL

First international
- Luxembourg 10 – 0 Ireland (Luxembourg City, Luxembourg; 27 April 2001)

Biggest defeat
- Ireland 1 – 20 Iceland (Luxembourg City, Luxembourg; 28 April 2001)

International record (W–L–T)
- 0–2–0

The Ireland men's national under 20 ice hockey team is the national under-20 ice hockey team of Ireland. The team is controlled by the Irish Ice Hockey Association, a member of the International Ice Hockey Federation.

== History ==
Ireland played its first game in 2001 during a qualification game against Luxembourg for participation in Division III of the 2002 World Junior Ice Hockey Championships. The game was held in Luxembourg City, Luxembourg, with Ireland losing 10–0. The game was part of a three team qualification tournament which included Iceland, Ireland and Luxembourg. The tournament was won by Iceland who won both of their games, including the 20–1 win over Ireland which was recorded as Ireland's worst ever loss, and gained promotion to the 2002 World Junior Ice Hockey Championships. Ireland who lost both of their games failed to qualify.

== International competitions ==
- 2001 World Junior Ice Hockey Championships Division III Qualification. Finish: 3rd

== See also ==
- Ireland men's national ice hockey team
