= Mikko Ruutu =

Finnish ice hockey player

- Born: September 10, 1978 (age 47) Vantaa, Finland
- Height: 6 ft 4 in (193 cm)
- Weight: 183 lb (83 kg; 13 st 1 lb)
- Position: Right wing
- Shot: Left
- Played for: HIFK; Jokerit
- NHL draft: 201st overall, 1999; Ottawa Senators
- Playing career: 1998–2003

Mikko Ruutu (born September 10, 1978 in Vantaa, Finland) is a retired Finnish ice hockey forward who is currently working as the Director of European Scouting for the Ottawa Senators.

== Career ==
Ruutu played for HIFK and Jokerit in the Finnish SM-liiga, earning a silver medal with HIFK and the SM-liiga championship with Jokerit in 2002. He was drafted by the Ottawa Senators as their 7th round pick in the 1999 NHL entry draft, but his only season in North America was for Clarkson University in the NCAA league. He has since retired from professional hockey because of his broken knee. He is currently working as the Director of European Scouting for the Ottawa Senators.

== Personal life ==
Mikko Ruutu has two brothers, Jarkko, a former NHL player who retired in 2014, and Tuomo, a former NHL player who retired in 2017.

== Career statistics ==
			Regular Season					Playoffs
Season	Team	League	GP	G	A	Pts	PIM	GP	G	A	Pts	PIM
1998–99	HIFK	SM-liiga	31	3	1	4	12	4	0	0	0	2
1999–00	Clarkson University	NCAA	33	5	5	10	26	--	--	--	--	--
2000–01	Jokerit	SM-liiga	56	5	6	11	38	5	0	1	1	2
2001–02	Jokerit	SM-liiga	47	3	3	6	65	5	1	0	1	27
2002–03	Jokerit	SM-liiga	23	2	4	6	4	10	0	1	1	4
SM-liiga Totals			157	13	14	27	119	24	1	2	3	35

== See also ==
- Notable families in the NHL
