= Jarkko Ruutu =

Finnish ice hockey player

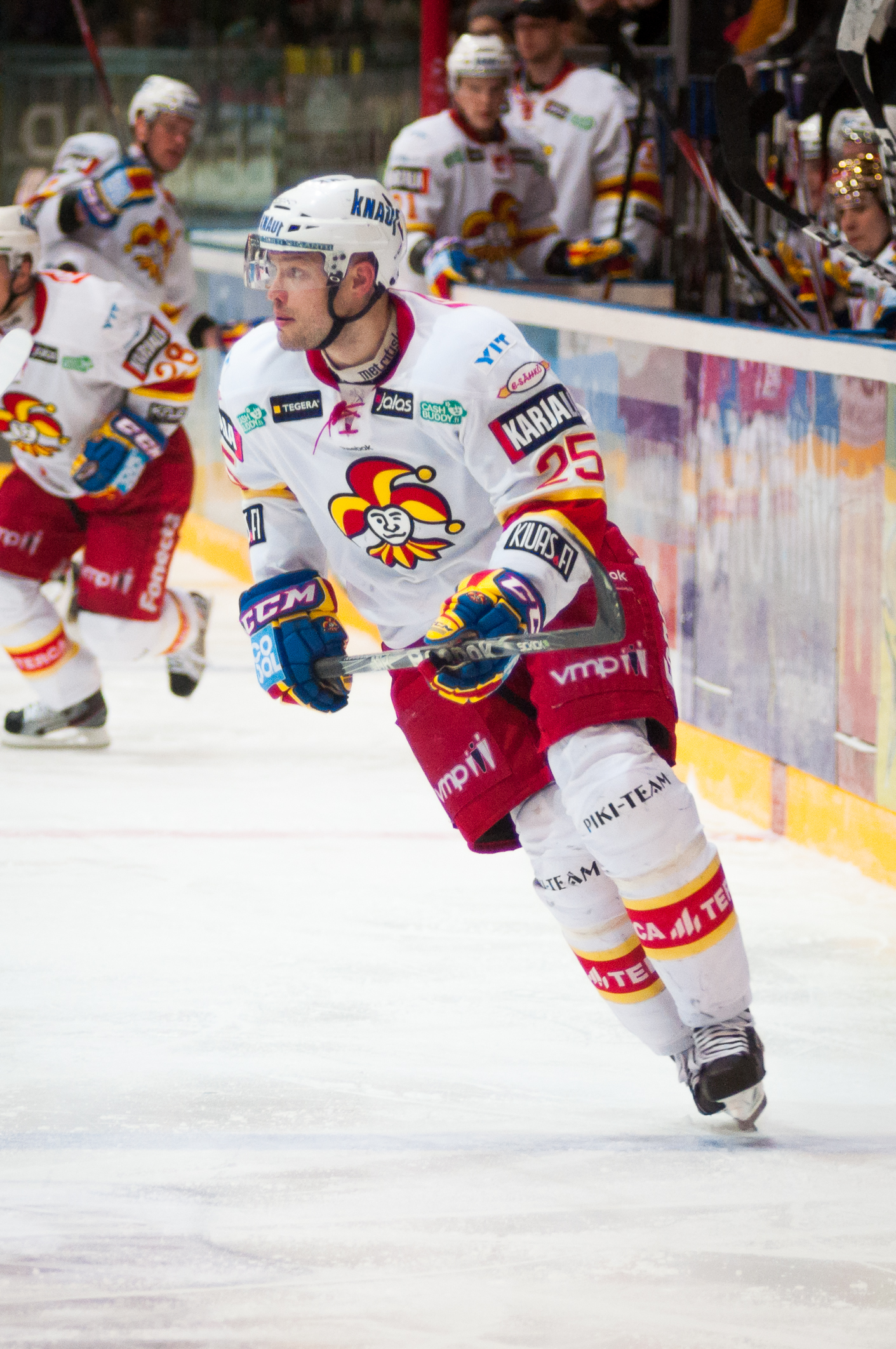
- Ruutu playing for Jokerit, 2013
- Born: 23 August 1975 (age 51) Vantaa, Finland
- Height: 6 ft 1 in (185 cm)
- Weight: 204 lb (93 kg; 14 st 8 lb)
- Position: Right wing
- Shot: Left
- Played for: HIFK; Vancouver Canucks; Pittsburgh Penguins; Ottawa Senators; Anaheim Ducks; Jokerit; EHC Biel
- National team: Finland
- NHL draft: 68th overall, 1998; Vancouver Canucks
- Playing career: 1996–2014

Jarkko Samuli Ruutu (Finnish pronunciation: [ˈjɑrk:o 'sɑmuli ˈruːtu]); born 23 August 1975) is a Finnish former professional ice hockey forward who played in the National Hockey League (NHL) with the Vancouver Canucks, Pittsburgh Penguins, Ottawa Senators and Anaheim Ducks. He is currently serving as a European development coach for the Buffalo Sabres.

== Playing career ==
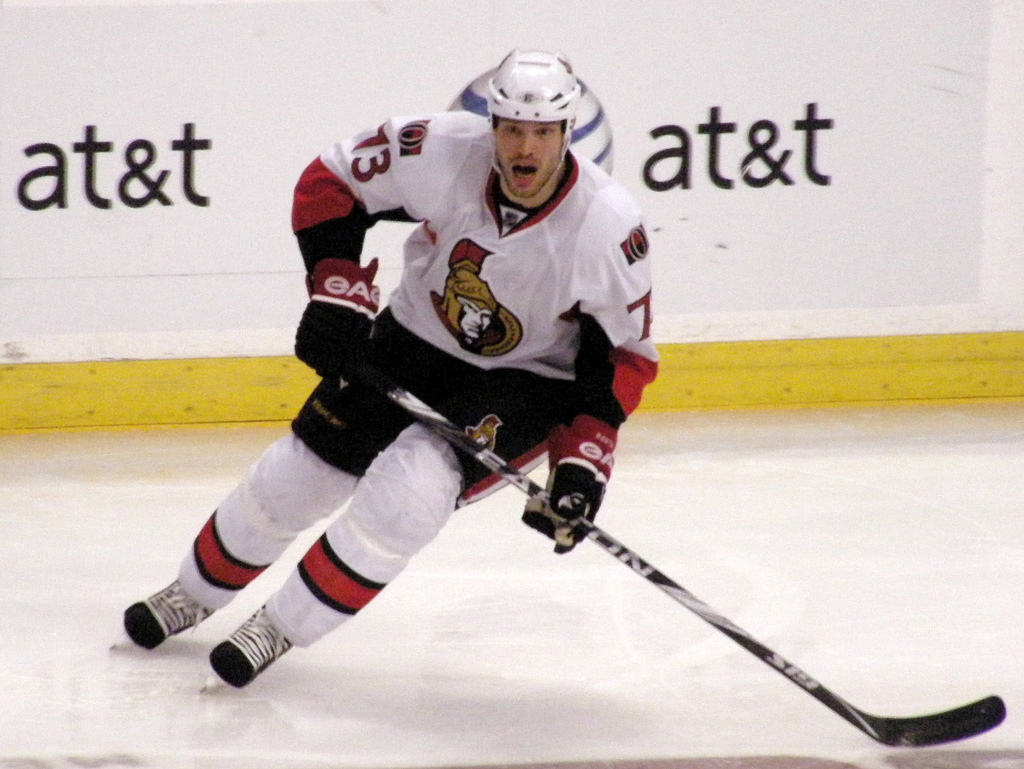
Ruutu playing for the Ottawa Senators, 2009

Ruutu initially moved to North America to play college hockey with Michigan Tech of the Western Collegiate Hockey Association (WCHA). However, after his first year, he returned to Finland and turned professional with HIFK of the SM-liiga in 1996–97. In his draft year, he recorded 20 points in 37 games and was then drafted by the Vancouver Canucks in the third round, 68th overall, in the 1998 NHL entry draft. He played one more season with HIFK before moving back to North America to play for the Canucks' American Hockey League (AHL) affiliate at the time, the Syracuse Crunch.

Ruutu played his first full season with the Canucks in 2001–02 and earned himself a reputation as one of the NHL's most effective "pests" or "agitators". During the 2004–05 NHL lockout, he returned to play for HIFK and set a SM-liiga record for penalty minutes in a single season with 215 (since broken by Matt Nickerson).

Ruutu had his best NHL season to date statistically in the 2005–06 season, scoring 10 goals and 7 assists for 17 points in 82 games, while amassing 142 penalty minutes with the Canucks. In the off-season, Ruutu became a free agent on 1 July 2006, and signed with the Pittsburgh Penguins. He recorded his first three-point game in NHL during his second season with the Penguins on 27 March 2008, against the New York Islanders.

In July 2008, Ruutu signed with the Ottawa Senators to a three-year, $3.9 million contract. On 13 November 3, 2008, he was suspended two games for elbowing Maxim Lapierre in the head two days earlier in a game against the Montreal Canadiens.

In a game on 6 January 2009, Ruutu allegedly bit the gloved thumb of Buffalo Sabres' enforcer Andrew Peters during a first-period altercation, although he denied this in a post-game interview and claimed Peters had actually gouged his eye and stuck his fingers into Ruutu's mouth. The next day, he was suspended for two games and fined $31,700 by the NHL for the incident.

On 17 February 2011, Ruutu was traded to the Anaheim Ducks in exchange for a sixth-round draft pick in 2011. In his final season in the NHL, Ruutu played out remainder of his contract with the Ducks, appearing in 23 games for a goal and assist.

After his NHL career, Ruutu returned to the SM-Liiga to play for Jokerit on a three-year contract. His contract was not renewed after Jokerit left SM-Liiga to join the Kontinental Hockey League (KHL) in 2014. He completed his professional career playing four games with EHC Biel in the Swiss National League A (NLA) during the 2014–15 season before announcing his retirement as a player on 15 December 2014.

== International play ==
Medal record

Men's ice hockey

Representing Finland

Olympic Games
Silver medal – second place	2006	Turin
Bronze medal – third place	2010	Vancouver

World Championships
Silver medal – second place	1998	Switzerland
Silver medal – second place	2001	Germany
Silver medal – second place	2007	Russia
Bronze medal – third place	2006	Latvia

Ruutu has appeared in six World Championships with Finland and has won silver medals in 1998, 2001 and 2007 and a bronze medal in 2006.

At the 2004 World Cup, Ruutu helped Finland to a second-place finish, losing the championship game to Canada.

Ruutu also won a silver medal with Finland at the 2006 Winter Olympics in Turin. He gained notoriety during the tournament when he checked Czech winger Jaromír Jágr to the boards while Jágr was crouching.

== Personal ==
Ruutu is married to Sofia Ruutu (née Morelius), a Finnish model and blogger. The couple have two children and live in Töölö, Helsinki. His younger brother, Tuomo Ruutu, also played in the NHL, appearing in more than 700 games, and was mostly recently active with HC Davos in the Swiss NLA. His other brother, retired player Mikko Ruutu, is currently a scout for the Ottawa Senators. Jarkko Ruutu is also a second cousin of Hanno Möttölä, who became the first Finnish basketball player to play in the National Basketball Association (NBA). Ruutu's cousin, Raul Ruutu, plays bass in Finnish pop rock band Sunrise Avenue.

== Career statistics ==
=== Regular season and playoffs ===
			Regular season					Playoffs
Season	Team	League	GP	G	A	Pts	PIM	GP	G	A	Pts	PIM
1991–92	HIFK	FIN U20	1	0	0	0	0	—	—	—	—	—
1992–93	HIFK	FIN U18	33	26	21	47	53	—	—	—	—	—
1992–93	HIFK	FIN U20	1	0	0	0	0	—	—	—	—	—
1993–94	HIFK	FIN U20	7	0	1	1	10	—	—	—	—	—
1994–95	HIFK	FIN U20	35	26	22	48	117	—	—	—	—	—
1995–96	Michigan Tech University	WCHA	38	12	10	22	96	—	—	—	—	—
1996–97	HIFK	SM-l	48	11	10	21	155	—	—	—	—	—
1997–98	HIFK	SM-l	37	10	10	20	166	9	7	4	11	10
1998–99	HIFK	SM-l	25	10	4	14	136	9	0	2	2	43
1999–2000	Vancouver Canucks	NHL	8	0	1	1	6	—	—	—	—	—
1999–2000	Syracuse Crunch	AHL	65	26	32	58	164	4	3	1	4	8
2000–01	Vancouver Canucks	NHL	21	3	3	6	32	4	0	1	1	8
2000–01	Kansas City Blades	IHL	46	11	18	29	111	—	—	—	—	—
2001–02	Vancouver Canucks	NHL	49	2	7	9	74	1	0	0	0	0
2002–03	Vancouver Canucks	NHL	36	2	2	4	66	13	0	2	2	14
2003–04	Vancouver Canucks	NHL	71	6	8	14	133	6	1	0	1	10
2004–05	HIFK	SM-l	50	10	18	28	215	3	0	0	0	41
2005–06	Vancouver Canucks	NHL	82	10	7	17	142	—	—	—	—	—
2006–07	Pittsburgh Penguins	NHL	81	7	9	16	125	5	0	0	0	10
2007–08	Pittsburgh Penguins	NHL	71	6	10	16	138	20	2	1	3	26
2008–09	Ottawa Senators	NHL	78	7	14	21	144	—	—	—	—	—
2009–10	Ottawa Senators	NHL	82	12	14	26	121	6	2	1	3	34
2010–11	Ottawa Senators	NHL	50	2	8	10	59	—	—	—	—	—
2010–11	Anaheim Ducks	NHL	23	1	1	2	38	3	0	0	0	12
2011–12	Jokerit	SM-l	59	14	21	35	192	10	1	2	3	33
2012–13	Jokerit	SM-l	48	12	17	29	122	6	0	1	1	14
2013–14	Jokerit	Liiga	51	10	11	21	86	2	0	1	1	0
2014–15	EHC Biel	NLA	4	0	0	0	14	—	—	—	—	—
SM-l/Liiga totals			318	77	91	168	1072	39	8	10	18	141
NHL totals			652	58	84	142	1078	58	5	5	10	114

=== International ===
Year	Team	Event	Result	GP	G	A	Pts	PIM
1998	Finland	WC	2nd place, silver medalist(s)	10	1	0	1	16
2001	Finland	WC	2nd place, silver medalist(s)	9	1	0	1	10
2002	Finland	OG	6th	4	0	0	0	4
2004	Finland	WC	6th	6	0	0	0	20
2004	Finland	WCH	2nd place, silver medalist(s)	4	0	0	0	6
2005	Finland	WC	7th	7	1	0	1	4
2006	Finland	OG	2nd place, silver medalist(s)	8	0	0	0	31
2006	Finland	WC	3rd place, bronze medalist(s)	9	0	3	3	34
2007	Finland	WC	2nd place, silver medalist(s)	9	0	1	1	29
2009	Finland	WC	5th	6	0	2	2	10
2010	Finland	OG	3rd place, bronze medalist(s)	6	2	1	3	14
Senior totals				78	5	7	12	172

== Transactions ==
- Signed as a free agent by HIFK Helsinki (Finland), 23 September 2004
- Signed as a free agent by Pittsburgh Penguins, 4 July 2006
- Signed as a free agent by Ottawa Senators, 2 July 2008
- Traded by the Ottawa Senators to the Anaheim Ducks, 17 February 2011
- Signed as a free agent by Jokerit, 9 September 2011

== See also ==
- Notable families in the NHL
- List of Olympic medalist families
