= David Pojkar =

Czech ice hockey player

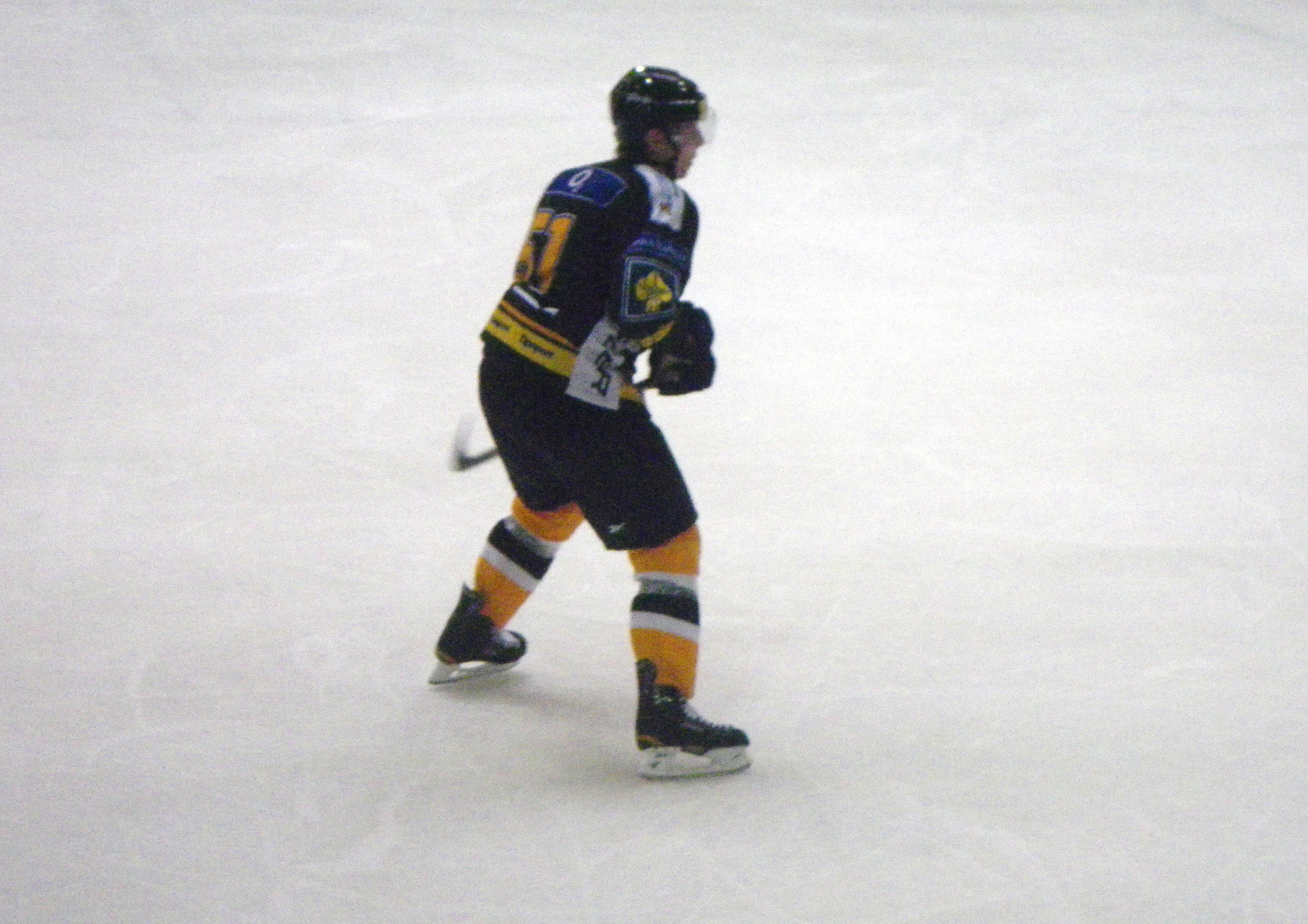
- Born: June 4, 1981 (age 45) Prague, Czechoslovakia
- Height: 6 ft 0 in (183 cm)
- Weight: 201 lb (91 kg; 14 st 5 lb)
- Position: Defence
- Shoots: Left
- Czech Extraliga team: HC Litvínov
- Playing career: 2000–present

David Pojkar (born June 4, 1981) is a Czech professional ice hockey defenceman. He played with HC Litvínov in the Czech Extraliga during the 2010–11 Czech Extraliga season. He began his professional career at HC Slavia Praha, where he has played during eight Extraliga seasons, from 1999–00 till 2006–07. In addition to HC Slavia Praha and HC Litvínov, he has played in the Czech Extraliga also with HC Slovan Ústečtí Lvi during the season 2007–08.

In the year 2001 Pojkar was part of the Czech Republic national under 20 ice hockey team, which won gold in the World Junior Ice Hockey Championships in Moscow, Russia.
