= 2001 World Junior Ice Hockey Championships =

2001 IIHF World Junior Championship

Tournament details
- Host country: Russia
- Venues: 3 (in 2 host cities)
- Dates: 26 December 2000 – 5 January 2001
- Teams: 10

Final positions
- Champions: Czech Republic (2nd title)
- Runners-up: Finland
- Third place: Canada
- Fourth place: Sweden

Tournament statistics
- Games played: 34
- Goals scored: 205 (6.03 per game)
- Attendance: 84,100 (2,474 per game)
- Scoring leader: (Czech Republic) Pavel Brendl (10 points)

The 2001 IIHF World U20 Championship, commonly referred to as the 2001 World Junior Hockey Championships (2001 WJHC), was the 25th edition of the Ice Hockey World Junior Championship. The tournament was held in Moscow and Podolsk, Russia from 26 December 2000, to 5 January 2001. The Czech Republic won the gold medal for the second consecutive year with a 2–1 victory over Finland in the championship game, while Canada won the bronze medal with a 2–1 overtime victory over Sweden.

== Venues ==
| Luzhniki Minor Arena Capacity: 8,700 | Soviet Wings Sport Palace Capacity: 5,266 | Vityaz Ice Palace Capacity: 5,500 |
| Russia – Moscow | Russia – Moscow | Russia – Podolsk |

== Top Division ==
=== Preliminary round ===
==== Group A ====
| Pos | Team | Pld | W | D | L | GF | GA | GD | Pts | Qualification |
|---|---|---|---|---|---|---|---|---|---|---|
| 1 | Czech Republic | 4 | 4 | 0 | 0 | 20 | 4 | +16 | 8 | Quarterfinals |
| 2 | United States | 4 | 3 | 0 | 1 | 21 | 8 | +13 | 6 | Quarterfinals |
| 3 | Sweden | 4 | 2 | 0 | 2 | 13 | 8 | +5 | 4 | Quarterfinals |
| 4 | Slovakia | 4 | 1 | 0 | 3 | 10 | 15 | −5 | 2 | Quarterfinals |
| 5 | Kazakhstan | 4 | 0 | 0 | 4 | 4 | 33 | −29 | 0 | Relegation round |

Source: IIHF.com at the Wayback Machine

All times local (MSK/UTC+3).

| 26 December 2000; 15:00 | United States | 9–1 (5–0, 1–0, 3–1) | Kazakhstan | Soviet Wings Sport Palace, Moscow; Attendance: 800 |

| 26 December 2000; 18:30 | Sweden | 1–2 (0–0, 0–1, 1–1) | Czech Republic | Soviet Wings Sport Palace, Moscow; Attendance: 1,500 |

| 27 December 2000; 15:00 | Kazakhstan | 1–9 (1–5, 0–2, 0–2) | Czech Republic | Soviet Wings Sport Palace, Moscow; Attendance: 850 |

| 27 December 2000; 18:30 | Sweden | 3–1 (1–0, 0–1, 2–0) | Slovakia | Soviet Wings Sport Palace, Moscow; Attendance: 1,200 |

| 28 December 2000; 18:30 | Slovakia | 2–7 (1–3, 1–2, 0–2) | United States | Soviet Wings Sport Palace, Moscow; Attendance: 1,500 |

| 29 December 2000; 18:30 | Czech Republic | 4–2 (1–0, 2–1, 1–1) | United States | Soviet Wings Sport Palace, Moscow; Attendance: 1,300 |

| 29 December 2000; 18:30 | Kazakhstan | 2–8 (1–0, 1–4, 0–4) | Sweden | Vityaz Arena, Podolsk; Attendance: 1,500 |

| 30 December 2000; 15:00 | Slovakia | 7–0 (1–0, 3–0, 3–0) | Kazakhstan | Soviet Wings Sport Palace, Moscow; Attendance: 700 |

| 31 December 2000; 13:00 | Czech Republic | 5–0 (1–0, 1–0, 3–0) | Slovakia | Soviet Wings Sport Palace, Moscow; Attendance: 950 |

| 31 December 2000; 17:00 | United States | 3–1 (1–1, 1–0, 1–0) | Sweden | Soviet Wings Sport Palace, Moscow; Attendance: 1,200 |

==== Group B ====
| Pos | Team | Pld | W | D | L | GF | GA | GD | Pts | Qualification |
|---|---|---|---|---|---|---|---|---|---|---|
| 1 | Finland | 4 | 3 | 1 | 0 | 13 | 5 | +8 | 7 | Quarterfinals |
| 2 | Russia | 4 | 2 | 1 | 1 | 19 | 8 | +11 | 5 | Quarterfinals |
| 3 | Canada | 4 | 2 | 1 | 1 | 20 | 9 | +11 | 5 | Quarterfinals |
| 4 | Switzerland | 4 | 1 | 1 | 2 | 12 | 15 | −3 | 3 | Quarterfinals |
| 5 | Belarus | 4 | 0 | 0 | 4 | 2 | 29 | −27 | 0 | Relegation round |

Source: IIHF.com at the Wayback Machine

All times local (MSK/UTC+3).

| 26 December 2000; 15:00 | Canada | 9–0 (5–0, 1–0, 3–0) | Belarus | Luzhniki Minor Arena, Moscow; Attendance: 800 |

Maxime Ouellet
Goalies
Dmitri Poshelyuk

| Cammalleri (Lundmark) (PP) - 0:46 | 1-0 |
| Heatley (Lundmark) (PP) - 5:41 | 2-0 |
| Cammalleri (Lundmark) - 9:14 | 3-0 |
| Heatley (Reid, Boyes) - (PP) - 14:53 | 4-0 |
| Spezza (Zigomanis, Popovich) - 19:52 | 5-0 |
| Torres (Zigomanis) - 32:26 | 6-0 |
| Reid (Hamhuis, Jackman) - 43:23 | 7-0 |
| Torres (Zigomanis) - 46:05 | 8-0 |
| Cammalleri (Popovich) - 55:25 | 9-0 |

37
Shots
21

| 26 December 2000; 18:30 | Switzerland | 3–3 (0–2, 1–0, 2–1) | Russia | Luzhniki Minor Arena, Moscow; Attendance: 6,300 |

| 27 December 2000; 18:30 | Switzerland | 2–3 (2–1, 0–0, 0–2) | Finland | Luzhniki Minor Arena, Moscow; Attendance: 1,450 |

| 27 December 2000; 18:30 | Belarus | 1–12 (0–4, 1–4, 0–4) | Russia | Vityaz Arena, Podolsk; Attendance: 4,500 |

| 28 December 2000; 18:30 | Finland | 2–2 (0–1, 1–1, 1–0) | Canada | Luzhniki Minor Arena, Moscow; Attendance: 2,100 |

Kari Lehtonen
Goalies
Maxime Ouellet

| | 0-1 | 10:53 - Lundmark (Cammalleri, Bouwmeester) |
| Salmelainen (Mäntylä, Hämäläinen) - 24:36 | 1-1 |
| | 1-2 | 39:35 - Boyes (Spezza, Jackman) (PP) |
| Rita (Paukkunen, Ruutu) - 52:01 | 2-2 |

27
Shots
25

| 29 December 2000; 15:00 | Belarus | 1–3 (0–1, 0–2, 1–0) | Switzerland | Luzhniki Minor Arena, Moscow; Attendance: 2,300 |

| 29 December 2000; 18:30 | Russia | 3–1 (0–0, 1–0, 2–1) | Canada | Luzhniki Minor Arena, Moscow; Attendance: 7,500 |

Andrei Medvedev
Goalies
Maxime Ouellet

| Buturlin (Volchenkov, Yakubov) - 23:33 | 1-0 |
| Buturlin (Volchenkov) (PP) - 42:54 | 2-0 |
| | 2-1 | 46:12 - McCarthy (Boyes) |
| Kovalchuk (Chistov) (EN) - 59:26 | 3-1 |

27
Shots
35

| 30 December 2000; 15:00 | Finland | 5–0 (1–0, 3–0, 1–0) | Belarus | Luzhniki Minor Arena, Moscow; Attendance: 1,150 |

| 31 December 2000; 13:00 | Russia | 1–3 (0–1, 0–2, 1–0) | Finland | Luzhniki Minor Arena, Moscow; Attendance: 6,200 |

| 31 December 2000; 17:00 | Canada | 8–4 (4–0, 2–0, 2–4) | Switzerland | Vityaz Arena, Podolsk; Attendance: 1,300 |

Maxime Ouellet
Goalies
Pascal Sievert

| Lundmark (Heatley, McCarthy) - 1:06 | 1-0 |
| Spezza (Bouwmeester) (PP) - 4:10 | 2-0 |
| Lundmark (Reid) - 7:48 | 3-0 |
| Jaspers (MacKenzie) - 10:00 | 4-0 |
| Heatley - 20:33 | 5-0 |
| Cammalleri (Ott, Stoll) - 39:33 | 6-0 |
| | 6-1 | 43:14 - Lakhmatov (Aeberli, Gerber) (PP) |
| | 6-2 | 43:59 - Hirschi (Duca) |
| | 6-3 | 51:54 - Heberlein (Helbling, Neff) (PP) |
| Spezza (Boyes) (PP) - 55:51 | 7-3 |
| Ott (Stoll) - 57:42 | 8-3 |
| | 8-4 | 57:57 - Camenzind (Helbling) |

38
Shots
21

=== Relegation round ===
| 2 January 2001; 18:30 | Kazakhstan | 2–5 (1–0, 1–1, 0–4) | Belarus | Vityaz Arena, Podolsk; Attendance: 3,850 |

| 3 January 2001; 18:30 | Belarus | 5–5 (1–1, 1–1, 3–3) | Kazakhstan | Vityaz Arena, Podolsk; Attendance: 2,100 |

Kazakhstan was relegated to Division I for the 2002 World Junior Ice Hockey Championships.

=== Final round ===
Quarterfinals
A1 | Czech Republic | 4
B4 | Switzerland | 3
B2 | Russia | 2
A3 | Sweden | 3
A2 | United States | 1
B3 | Canada | 2
B1 | Finland | 3
A4 | Slovakia | 1

Semifinals
A1 | Czech Republic | 1
A3 | Sweden | 0
B3 | Canada | 2
B1 | Finland | 5

Gold medal game
A1 | Czech Republic | 2
B1 | Finland | 1
Bronze medal game
B3 | Canada | 2^{†}
A3 | Sweden | 1

† Overtime victory.

==== Quarterfinals ====
| 2 January 2001; 15:00 | Russia | 2–3 (0–1, 1–1, 1–1) | Sweden | Luzhniki Minor Arena, Moscow; Attendance: 7,300 |

| 2 January 2001; 15:00 | Czech Republic | 4–3 (1–1, 1–2, 2–0) | Switzerland | Soviet Wings Sport Palace, Moscow; Attendance: 1,300 |

| 2 January 2001; 18:30 | Finland | 3–1 (0–0, 2–0, 1–1) | Slovakia | Luzhniki Minor Arena, Moscow; Attendance: 1,050 |

| 2 January 2001; 18:30 | United States | 1–2 (1–1, 0–0, 0–1) | Canada | Soviet Wings Sport Palace, Moscow; Attendance: 2,500 |

Rick DiPietro
Goalies
Maxime Ouellet

| Surma - 3:18 | 1-0 |
| | 1-1 | 5:48 - Ott (Reid, Jackman) |
| | 1-2 | 54:54 - Lundmark (Heatley, Cammalleri) (PP) |

23
Shots
15

==== Consolation round ====
| 3 January 2001; 15:00 | Russia | 2–3 (0–1, 1–1, 1–1) | Switzerland | Soviet Wings Sport Palace, Moscow; Attendance: 2,500 |

| 3 January 2001; 18:30 | United States | 3–2 (1–1, 1–1, 1–0) | Slovakia | Soviet Wings Sport Palace, Moscow; Attendance: 600 |

==== Semifinals ====
| 3 January 2001; 15:00 | Czech Republic | 1–0 (1–0, 0–0, 0–0) | Sweden | Luzhniki Minor Arena, Moscow; Attendance: 2,500 |

| 3 January 2001; 18:30 | Canada | 2–5 (0–1, 1–2, 1–2) | Finland | Luzhniki Minor Arena, Moscow; Attendance: 1,950 |

Maxime Ouellet
Goalies
Ari Ahonen

| | 0-1 | 5:23 - Rita (Mäntylä) |
| MacKenzie (Morisset) - 24:11 | 1-1 |
| | 1-2 | 30:05 - Mäntylä |
| | 1-3 | 48:44 - Hämäläinen (Koivu, Mäntylä) |
| Torres (MacKenzie) - 48:05 | 2-3 |
| | 2-4 | 57:17 - Venäläinen (Sainomaa) |
| | 2-5 | 59:40 - Malmivaara (EN) |

30
Shots
30

==== 7th place game ====
| 5 January 2001; 12:00 | Russia | 4–3 (2–0, 1–1, 1–2) | Slovakia | Soviet Wings Sport Palace, Moscow; Attendance: 2,500 |

==== 5th place game ====
| 5 January 2001; 16:00 | United States | 4–0 (1–0, 1–0, 2–0) | Switzerland | Soviet Wings Sport Palace, Moscow; Attendance: 1,000 |

==== Bronze medal game ====
| 5 January 2001; 12:00 | (bronze) Canada | 2–1 OT (0-1, 1-0, 0-0, 1-0) | Sweden | Luzhniki Minor Arena, Moscow; Attendance: 1,750 |

Maxime Ouellet
Goalies
Henrik Lundqvist

| | 0-1 | 5:04 - Samuelsson (Eriksson, Tolsa) |
| 23:03 - Zigomanis (Spezza, Torres) | 1-1 |
| 60:37 - Torres (Spezza) | 2–1 |

34
Shots
36

==== Gold medal game ====
| 5 January 2001; 16:00 | (gold) Czech Republic | 2–1; 1–0, 1–1, 0–0) | Finland (silver) | Luzhniki Minor Arena, Moscow; Attendance: 6,400 |

Tomáš Duba
Goalies
Ari Ahonen

| Rostislav Klesla – 13:19 | 1–0 |
| Václav Nedorost – 22:54 | 2–0 |
| | 2–1 | 38:51 − Jani Rita |

=== Scoring leaders ===
| Rank | Player | Country | Pos | GP | G | A | Pts | PIM | +/− |
|---|---|---|---|---|---|---|---|---|---|
| 1 | Pavel Brendl | Czech Republic | F | 7 | 4 | 6 | 10 | 8 | +8 |
| 2 | Jani Rita | Finland | F | 7 | 8 | 1 | 9 | 0 | +5 |
| 3 | Jon DiSalvatore | United States | F | 7 | 6 | 3 | 9 | 2 | +2 |
| 4 | Václav Nedorost | Czech Republic | F | 7 | 4 | 5 | 9 | 0 | +7 |
| 4 | Andy Hilbert | United States | F | 7 | 4 | 5 | 9 | 6 | +3 |
| 6 | Jeff Taffe | United States | F | 7 | 6 | 2 | 8 | 6 | +1 |
| 7 | Zdeněk Blatný | Czech Republic | F | 7 | 5 | 2 | 7 | 6 | +8 |
| 8 | Ville Hämäläinen | Finland | F | 7 | 4 | 3 | 7 | 0 | +4 |
| 8 | Jamie Lundmark | Canada | F | 7 | 4 | 3 | 7 | 6 | 0 |
| 10 | Rostislav Klesla | Czech Republic | D | 7 | 3 | 4 | 7 | 4 | 8 |

=== Goaltending leaders ===
Minimum 90 minutes played.

| Rank | Player | Country | TOI | SOG | GA | GAA | Saves | Sv % | SO |
|---|---|---|---|---|---|---|---|---|---|
| 1 | Tomáš Duba | Czech Republic | 420:00 | 151 | 8 | 1.14 | 143 | 94.70 | 2 |
| 2 | Maxime Ouellet | Canada | 398:24 | 172 | 10 | 1.51 | 162 | 94.19 | 1 |
| 3 | Ari Ahonen | Finland | 358:17 | 119 | 8 | 1.34 | 111 | 93.28 | 1 |
| 4 | Henrik Lundqvist | Sweden | 419:19 | 180 | 13 | 1.86 | 167 | 92.78 | 0 |
| 5 | Rick DiPietro | United States | 359:43 | 109 | 8 | 1.33 | 101 | 92.66 | 1 |

=== Tournament awards ===
| | Goaltender | Defencemen | | Forwards | | |
|---|---|---|---|---|---|---|
| IIHF Directorate Awards | (Czech Republic) Tomáš Duba | (Czech Republic) Rostislav Klesla | | (Czech Republic) Pavel Brendl | | |
| Media All-Star Team | (Finland) Ari Ahonen | (Czech Republic) Rostislav Klesla | (Finland) Tuukka Mäntylä | (Canada) Jason Spezza | (Czech Republic) Pavel Brendl | (Finland) Jani Rita |

=== Final standings ===
| | Team |
|---|---|
| 1st place, gold medalist(s) | Czech Republic |
| 2nd place, silver medalist(s) | Finland |
| 3rd place, bronze medalist(s) | Canada |
| 4 | Sweden |
| 5 | United States |
| 6 | Switzerland |
| 7 | Russia |
| 8 | Slovakia |
| 9 | Belarus |
| 10 | Kazakhstan |

== Division I ==
The Division I tournament was played in Landsberg and Füssen, Germany between 10 December and 16 December 2000.

=== Preliminary round ===
==== Group A ====
| Pos | Team | Pld | W | D | L | GF | GA | GD | Pts | Qualification |
|---|---|---|---|---|---|---|---|---|---|---|
| 1 | Ukraine | 3 | 3 | 0 | 0 | 13 | 5 | +8 | 6 | Final round |
| 2 | Norway | 3 | 1 | 1 | 1 | 8 | 7 | +1 | 3 | Final round |
| 3 | Austria | 3 | 1 | 1 | 1 | 11 | 12 | −1 | 3 | Relegation round |
| 4 | Poland | 3 | 0 | 0 | 3 | 7 | 15 | −8 | 0 | Relegation round |

Source: IIHF.com at the Wayback Machine

| 10 December 2000; 15:00 | Ukraine | 4–0 (1–0, 2–0, 1–0) | Austria | Attendance: 350 |

| 10 December 2000; 18:30 | Norway | 2–0 (1–0, 0–0, 1–0) | Poland | Attendance: 301 |

| 12 December 2000; 16:00 | Norway | 3–3 (1–1, 1–0, 1–2) | Austria | Attendance: 500 |

| 12 December 2000; 19:30 | Poland | 2–5 (0–3, 1–1, 1–1) | Ukraine | Attendance: 496 |

| 13 December 2000; 16:00 | Austria | 8–5 (0–2, 4–2, 4–1) | Poland | Attendance: 450 |

| 13 December 2000; 19:30 | Ukraine | 4–3 (2–0, 2–2, 0–1) | Norway | Attendance: 334 |

==== Group B ====
| Pos | Team | Pld | W | D | L | GF | GA | GD | Pts | Qualification |
|---|---|---|---|---|---|---|---|---|---|---|
| 1 | France | 3 | 2 | 0 | 1 | 7 | 6 | +1 | 4 | Final round |
| 2 | Germany | 3 | 2 | 0 | 1 | 7 | 3 | +4 | 4 | Final round |
| 3 | Latvia | 3 | 1 | 1 | 1 | 9 | 12 | −3 | 3 | Relegation round |
| 4 | Italy | 3 | 0 | 1 | 2 | 5 | 7 | −2 | 1 | Relegation round |

Source: IIHF.com at the Wayback Machine

| 10 December 2000; 15:00 | Germany | 5–1 (2–0, 1–1, 2–0) | Latvia | Attendance: 352 |

| 10 December 2000; 18:30 | France | 2–1 (1–0, 1–1, 0–0) | Italy | Attendance: 400 |

| 11 December 2000; 16:00 | France | 3–4 (1–1, 1–3, 1–0) | Latvia | Attendance: 400 |

| 11 December 2000; 19:30 | Italy | 0–1 (0–1, 0–0, 0–0) | Germany | Attendance: 400 |

| 13 December 2000; 16:00 | Latvia | 4–4 (0–0, 3–3, 1–1) | Italy | Attendance: 350 |

| 13 December 2000; 19:30 | Germany | 1–2 (0–1, 0–0, 1–1) | France | Attendance: 300 |

=== Final round ===
| Pos | Team | Pld | W | D | L | GF | GA | GD | Pts | Promotion |
|---|---|---|---|---|---|---|---|---|---|---|
| 1 | France | 3 | 2 | 0 | 1 | 4 | 9 | −5 | 4 | Promoted to the 2002 Top Division |
| 2 | Germany | 3 | 2 | 0 | 1 | 8 | 5 | +3 | 4 | |
| 3 | Ukraine | 3 | 1 | 0 | 2 | 6 | 7 | −1 | 2 | |
| 4 | Norway | 3 | 1 | 0 | 2 | 12 | 9 | +3 | 2 | |

Source: IIHF.com at the Wayback Machine

| Carried forward from | Germany | 1–2 | France |

| preliminary round | Ukraine | 4–3 | Norway |

| 15 December 2000; 16:00 | Ukraine | 1–2 (1–0, 0–1, 0–1) | Germany | Attendance: 1,205 |

| 15 December 2000; 19:30 | France | 0–7 (0–2, 0–3, 0–2) | Norway | Attendance: 515 |

| 16 December 2000; 16:00 | Norway | 2–5 (1–1, 1–0, 0–4) | Germany | Attendance: 1,206 |

| 16 December 2000; 19:30 | Ukraine | 1–2 (0–1, 1–1, 0–0) | France | Attendance: 550 |

France was promoted to the Top Division for the 2002 World Junior Ice Hockey Championships.

=== Relegation round ===
| Pos | Team | Pld | W | D | L | GF | GA | GD | Pts | Relegation |
|---|---|---|---|---|---|---|---|---|---|---|
| 5 | Austria | 3 | 2 | 1 | 0 | 16 | 11 | +5 | 5 | |
| 6 | Poland | 3 | 2 | 0 | 1 | 19 | 15 | +4 | 4 | |
| 7 | Italy | 3 | 0 | 2 | 1 | 10 | 14 | −4 | 2 | |
| 8 | Latvia | 3 | 0 | 1 | 2 | 11 | 16 | −5 | 1 | Relegated to the 2002 Division II |

Source: IIHF.com at the Wayback Machine

| Carried forward from | Latvia | 4–4 | Italy |

| preliminary round | Austria | 8–5 | Poland |

| 15 December 2000; 16:00 | Latvia | 4–7 (1–0, 2–0, 1–7) | Poland | Attendance: 320 |

| 15 December 2000; 19:30 | Austria | 3–3 (0–1, 2–1, 1–1) | Italy | Attendance: 346 |

| 16 December 2000; 16:00 | Austria | 5–3 (2–1, 2–1, 1–1) | Latvia | Attendance: 350 |

| 16 December 2000; 19:30 | Poland | 7–3 (1–0, 3–2, 3–1) | Italy | Attendance: 340 |

Latvia was relegated to Division II for the 2002 World Junior Ice Hockey Championships.

== Division II ==
The Division II tournament was played in Elektrėnai and Kaunas, Lithuania between 30 December 2000, and 3 January 2001.

=== Preliminary round ===
==== Group A ====
| Pos | Team | Pld | W | D | L | GF | GA | GD | Pts | Qualification |
|---|---|---|---|---|---|---|---|---|---|---|
| 1 | Japan | 3 | 3 | 0 | 0 | 26 | 4 | +22 | 6 | 1st place game |
| 2 | Denmark | 3 | 2 | 0 | 1 | 22 | 13 | +9 | 4 | 3rd place game |
| 3 | Croatia | 3 | 0 | 1 | 2 | 7 | 21 | −14 | 1 | 5th place game |
| 4 | Hungary | 3 | 0 | 1 | 2 | 10 | 27 | −17 | 1 | 7th place game |

Source: IIHF.com at the Wayback Machine

| 30 December 2000; 15:30 | Hungary | 0–14 (0–3, 0–4, 0–7) | Japan | Attendance: 353 |

| 30 December 2000; 19:00 | Denmark | 10–2 (2–0, 6–0, 2–2) | Croatia | Attendance: 300 |

| 31 December 2000; 14:00 | Hungary | 5–5 (0–2, 2–1, 3–2) | Croatia | Attendance: 300 |

| 31 December 2000; 17:30 | Japan | 6–4 (1–0, 2–1, 3–3) | Denmark | Attendance: 300 |

| 2 January 2001; 14:00 | Croatia | 0–6 (0–2, 0–3, 0–1) | Japan | Attendance: 300 |

| 2 January 2001; 17:30 | Denmark | 8–5 (1–1, 3–1, 4–3) | Hungary | Attendance: 333 |

==== Group B ====
| Pos | Team | Pld | W | D | L | GF | GA | GD | Pts | Qualification |
|---|---|---|---|---|---|---|---|---|---|---|
| 1 | Slovenia | 3 | 3 | 0 | 0 | 17 | 4 | +13 | 6 | 1st place game |
| 2 | Lithuania | 3 | 2 | 0 | 1 | 11 | 10 | +1 | 4 | 3rd place game |
| 3 | Great Britain | 3 | 1 | 0 | 2 | 6 | 13 | −7 | 2 | 5th place game |
| 4 | Estonia | 3 | 0 | 0 | 3 | 3 | 10 | −7 | 0 | 7th place game |

Source: IIHF.com at the Wayback Machine

| 30 December 2000; 14:00 | Great Britain | 4–2 (1–1, 2–1, 1–0) | Estonia | Attendance: 300 |

| 30 December 2000; 17:30 | Slovenia | 8–3 (1–0, 3–1, 4–2) | Lithuania | Attendance: 1,600 |

| 31 December 2000; 14:00 | Estonia | 1–3 (0–1, 0–2, 1–0) | Slovenia | Attendance: 300 |

| 31 December 2000; 17:30 | Great Britain | 2–5 (1–1, 0–3, 1–1) | Lithuania | Attendance: 800 |

| 2 January 2001; 14:00 | Slovenia | 6–0 (2–0, 0–0, 4–0) | Great Britain | Attendance: 300 |

| 2 January 2001; 17:30 | Lithuania | 3–0 (3–0, 0–0, 0–0) | Estonia | Attendance: 2,000 |

=== Final round ===
All times local (EET/UTC+2).

==== 7th place game ====
| 3 January 2001; 14:00 | Hungary | 5–3 (1–0, 3–1, 1–2) | Estonia | Kaunas; Attendance: 300 |

Estonia was relegated to Division III for the 2002 World Junior Ice Hockey Championships.

==== 5th place game ====
| 3 January 2001; 18:00 | Croatia | 6–7 (2–4, 0–1, 4–2) | Great Britain | Kaunas; Attendance: 323 |

==== 3rd place game ====
| 3 January 2001; 14:00 | Denmark | 4–5 (3–3, 1–1, 0–1) | Lithuania | Elektrėnai; Attendance: 676 |

==== 1st place game ====
| 3 January 2001; 18:00 | Japan | 3–4 (0–1, 2–1, 1–2) | Slovenia | Elektrėnai; Attendance: 300 |

Slovenia was promoted to Division I for the 2002 World Junior Ice Hockey Championships.

== Division III ==
The Division III tournament was played in Belgrade, Federal Republic of Yugoslavia between 4 January and 8 January 2001.

=== Preliminary round ===
==== Group A ====
| Pos | Team | Pld | W | D | L | GF | GA | GD | Pts | Qualification |
|---|---|---|---|---|---|---|---|---|---|---|
| 1 | Spain | 3 | 3 | 0 | 0 | 20 | 4 | +16 | 6 | 1st place game |
| 2 | Yugoslavia | 3 | 2 | 0 | 1 | 20 | 9 | +11 | 4 | 3rd place game |
| 3 | Bulgaria | 3 | 1 | 0 | 2 | 5 | 14 | −9 | 2 | 5th place game |
| 4 | Mexico | 3 | 0 | 0 | 3 | 3 | 21 | −18 | 0 | 7th place game |

Source: IIHF.com at the Wayback Machine

| 4 January 2001; 11:30 | Spain | 10–0 (3–0, 2–0, 5–0) | Mexico | Hala Pionir, Belgrade; Attendance: 300 |

| 4 January 2001; 17:30 | Yugoslavia | 9–1 (1–1, 4–0, 4–0) | Bulgaria | Hala Pionir, Belgrade; Attendance: 3,000 |

| 5 January 2001; 11:30 | Spain | 3–0 (0–0, 1–0, 2–0) | Bulgaria | Hala Pionir, Belgrade; Attendance: 300 |

| 5 January 2001; 17:30 | Mexico | 1–7 (0–3, 1–0, 0–4) | Yugoslavia | Hala Pionir, Belgrade; Attendance: 2,000 |

| 7 January 2001; 11:30 | Bulgaria | 4–2 (2–1, 1–0, 1–1) | Mexico | Hala Pionir, Belgrade; Attendance: 300 |

| 7 January 2001; 17:30 | Yugoslavia | 4–7 (1–1, 2–4, 1–2) | Spain | Hala Pionir, Belgrade; Attendance: 3,000 |

==== Group B ====
| Pos | Team | Pld | W | D | L | GF | GA | GD | Pts | Qualification |
|---|---|---|---|---|---|---|---|---|---|---|
| 1 | Netherlands | 3 | 3 | 0 | 0 | 30 | 3 | +27 | 6 | 1st place game |
| 2 | Romania | 3 | 2 | 0 | 1 | 26 | 7 | +19 | 4 | 3rd place game |
| 3 | South Africa | 3 | 0 | 1 | 2 | 10 | 29 | −19 | 1 | 5th place game |
| 4 | Australia | 3 | 0 | 1 | 2 | 7 | 34 | −27 | 1 | 7th place game |

Source: IIHF.com at the Wayback Machine

| 4 January 2001; 14:30 | Netherlands | 11–1 (3–0, 4–0, 4–1) | South Africa | Hala Pionir, Belgrade; Attendance: 300 |

| 4 January 2001; 20:30 | Romania | 13–0 (3–0, 5–0, 5–0) | Australia | Hala Pionir, Belgrade; Attendance: 300 |

| 5 January 2001; 14:30 | South Africa | 2–11 (0–3, 1–6, 1–2) | Romania | Hala Pionir, Belgrade; Attendance: 300 |

| 5 January 2001; 20:30 | Netherlands | 14–0 (4–0, 4–0, 6–0) | Australia | Hala Pionir, Belgrade; Attendance: 300 |

| 7 January 2001; 14:30 | Romania | 2–5 (1–2, 1–2, 0–1) | Netherlands | Hala Pionir, Belgrade; Attendance: 300 |

| 7 January 2001; 20:30 | Australia | 7–7 (2–1, 2–3, 3–3) | South Africa | Hala Pionir, Belgrade; Attendance: 300 |

=== Final round ===
All times local (EET/UTC+2).

==== 7th place game ====
| 8 January 2001; 11:30 | Mexico | 5–3 (2–2, 3–1, 0–0) | Australia | Hala Pionir, Belgrade; Attendance: 300 |

Australia was relegated to Division III Qualification for the 2002 World Junior Ice Hockey Championships, but did not participate again until 2003.

==== 5th place game ====
| 8 January 2001; 14:30 | Bulgaria | 3–2 (1–0, 0–0, 2–2) | South Africa | Hala Pionir, Belgrade; Attendance: 300 |

==== 3rd place game ====
| 8 January 2001; 17:30 | Yugoslavia | 3–5 (0–2, 0–1, 3–2) | Romania | Hala Pionir, Belgrade; Attendance: 2,000 |

==== 1st place game ====
| 8 January 2001; 20:30 | Spain | 1–6 (1–1, 0–1, 0–4) | Netherlands | Hala Pionir, Belgrade; Attendance: 1,700 |

Netherlands was promoted to Division II for the 2002 World Junior Ice Hockey Championships.

== Division III Qualification ==
The Division III qualification tournament was played in Luxembourg City, Luxembourg between 26 April and 28 April 2001.

| Pos | Team | Pld | W | D | L | GF | GA | GD | Pts | Promotion |
|---|---|---|---|---|---|---|---|---|---|---|
| 1 | Iceland | 2 | 2 | 0 | 0 | 26 | 3 | +23 | 4 | Promoted to the 2002 Division III |
| 2 | Luxembourg | 2 | 1 | 0 | 1 | 12 | 6 | +6 | 2 | |
| 3 | Ireland | 2 | 0 | 0 | 2 | 1 | 30 | −29 | 0 | |

Source: IIHF.com at the Wayback Machine

| 26 April 2001; 19:00 | Iceland | 6–2 (2–0, 3–1, 1–1) | Luxembourg | Luxembourg City; Attendance: 300 |

| 27 April 2001; 18:00 | Luxembourg | 10–0 (4–0, 4–0, 2–0) | Ireland | Luxembourg City; Attendance: 300 |

| 28 April 2001; 11:00 | Ireland | 1–20 (1–9, 0–3, 0–8) | Iceland | Luxembourg City; Attendance: 300 |

Iceland was promoted to Division III of the 2002 World Junior Ice Hockey Championships.

| Preceded by 2000 World Juniors | World Junior Ice Hockey Championships; See also: 2001 World Championships | Succeeded by 2002 World Juniors |
