= Martin Drotár =

Slovak ice hockey player

- Born: 5 November 1981 (age 43); Košice, Czechoslovakia
- Height: 6 ft 0 in (183 cm)
- Weight: 181 lb (82 kg; 12 st 13 lb)
- Position: Forward
- Shot: Left
- Played for: HC Košice; HK Dubnica; Ducs de Dijon; MHK Kežmarok; HC '05 Banská Bystrica; HK SKP Poprad; MHC Martin
- Playing career: 2000–2017

Martin Drotár (born 5 November 1981 in Košice, Czechoslovakia) is a Slovak former professional ice hockey player.

Drotár played in the Slovak Extraliga for HC Košice, HK Dubnica, MHK Kežmarok, HC '05 Banská Bystrica, HK SKP Poprad and MHC Martin. He also had a spell in France's Ligue Magnus for Ducs de Dijon.

== Career statistics ==
			Regular season					Playoffs
Season	Team	League	GP	G	A	Pts	PIM	GP	G	A	Pts	PIM
1997–98	HC Košice U18	Slovak U18	46	24	18	42	44	—	—	—	—	—
1998–99	HC Košice U20	Slovak U20	30	8	6	14	36	—	—	—	—	—
1999–00	HC Košice U20	Slovak U20	50	21	29	50	74	—	—	—	—	—
2000–01	HC Košice U20	Slovak U20	6	1	1	2	8	—	—	—	—	—
2000–01	HC Košice	Slovak	44	10	8	18	16	—	—	—	—	—
2001–02	HC Košice	Slovak	54	8	18	26	38	—	—	—	—	—
2002–03	HC Košice	Slovak	54	17	19	36	54	—	—	—	—	—
2003–04	HC Košice	Slovak	54	5	13	18	24	—	—	—	—	—
2004–05	HK Dubnica	Slovak	37	5	1	6	24	—	—	—	—	—
2004–05	HK Trebisov	Slovak2	7	4	4	8	12	—	—	—	—	—
2005–06	Ducs de Dijon	Ligue Magnus	26	4	8	12	42	9	1	3	4	4
2006–07	MHK Kežmarok	Slovak2	42	21	28	49	69	—	—	—	—	—
2007–08	MHK Kežmarok	Slovak	51	10	15	25	42	—	—	—	—	—
2008–09	MHK Kežmarok	Slovak	58	22	30	52	76	—	—	—	—	—
2009–10	HC Banska Bystrica	Slovak	38	4	16	20	30	6	1	0	1	0
2009–10	HK Brezno	Slovak2	1	0	0	0	2	—	—	—	—	—
2010–11	HK Poprad	Slovak	11	0	1	1	6	—	—	—	—	—
2010–11	HK Brezno	Slovak2	14	5	6	11	14	—	—	—	—	—
2010–11	HK Michalovce	Slovak2	—	—	—	—	—	4	0	0	0	0
2011–12	MHC Martin	Slovak	12	1	0	1	4	—	—	—	—	—
2011–12	HK Michalovce	Slovak2	30	14	19	33	22	8	1	3	4	22
2012–13	HK Michalovce	Slovak2	43	17	21	38	64	13	1	5	6	16
2013–14	HK Michalovce	Slovak2	41	16	25	41	100	13	2	3	5	39
2014–15	HK Michalovce	Slovak2	40	17	20	37	91	5	1	1	2	2
2015–16	HK Michalovce	Slovak2	38	16	18	34	68	5	1	2	3	4
2016–17	HK Michalovce	Slovak2	48	19	24	43	56	8	2	3	5	14
Slovak totals			413	82	121	203	314	6	1	0	1	0
Slovak2 totals			304	129	165	294	498	56	8	17	25	97
