= Steve Hirschi =

Swiss ice hockey player

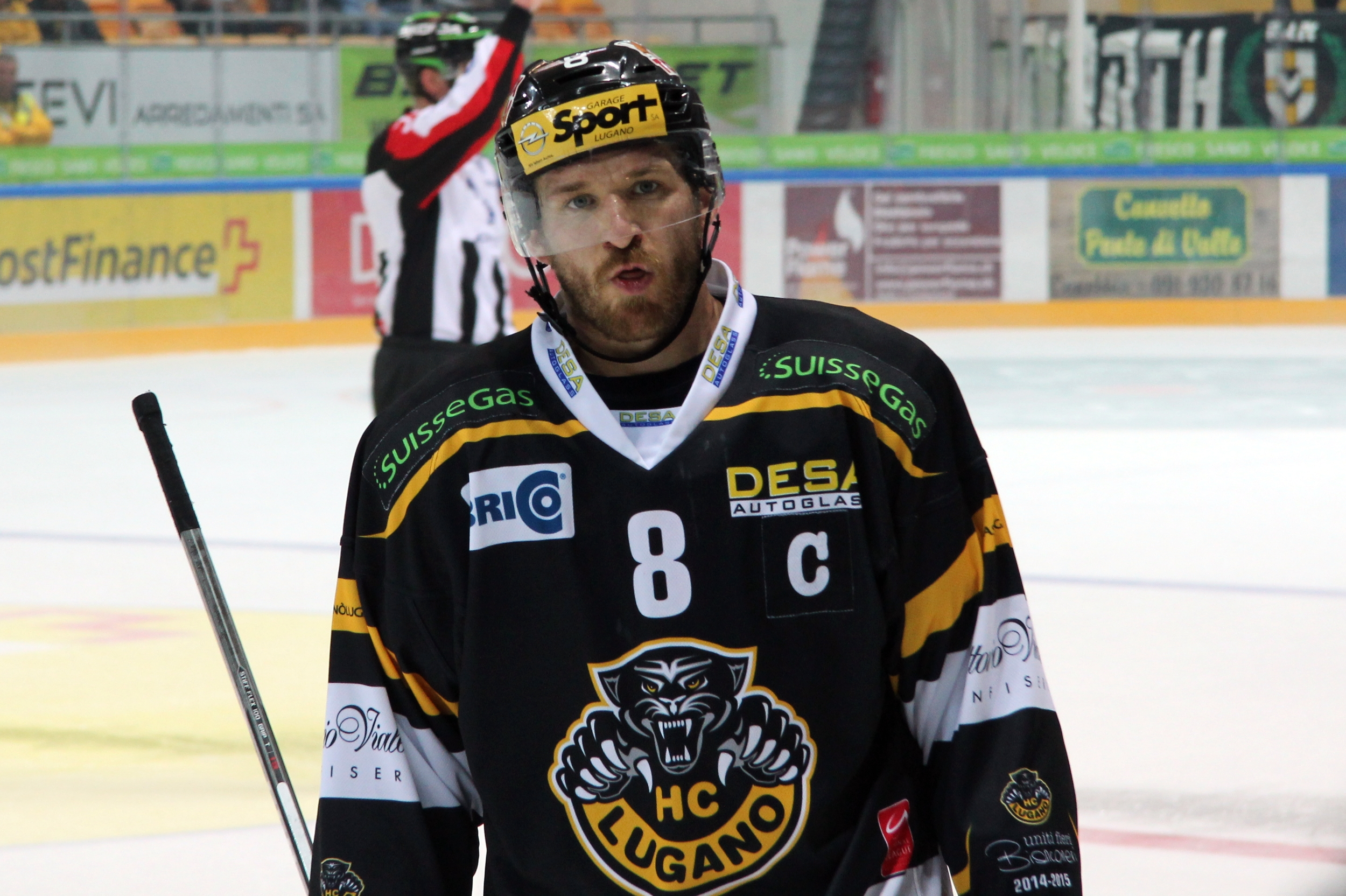
- Born: September 18, 1981 (age 43); Grosshöchstetten, Switzerland
- Height: 5 ft 10 in (178 cm)
- Weight: 192 lb (87 kg; 13 st 10 lb)
- Position: Defence
- Shot: Left
- Played for: SCL Tigers; HC Lugano
- National team: Switzerland
- Playing career: 1999–2017

Steve Hirschi (born 18 September 1981 in Grosshöchstetten, Switzerland) is a Swiss former professional ice hockey Defenseman who most notably played for as Captain of HC Lugano in the National League A (NLA).

== Playing career ==
Hirschi played with SC Langnau until 2003 and then signed with fellow NLA club HC Lugano. He won the Swiss national championship with HCL in 2006 and later served as team captain.

He announced on February 23, 2017, that he will retire at the end of the 2016-17 season to begin his coaching career in HC Lugano's youth ranks.

== International play ==
He participated at the 2006 Olympic Games as well as at the 2007 and 2010 IIHF World Championship as a member of the Switzerland men's national ice hockey team.

== Personal ==
Hirschi practises a vegan lifestyle.

== Career statistics ==
=== Regular season and playoffs ===
			Regular season					Playoffs
Season	Team	League	GP	G	A	Pts	PIM	GP	G	A	Pts	PIM
1997–98	SC Langnau	SUI U20	35	2	8	10	20
1998–99	SC Langnau	SUI U20	33	11	13	24	18	8	0	2	2	6
1998–99	SC Langnau	NDA	7	0	0	0	2	—	—	—	—	—
1998–99	SC Signau	SUI.3
1999–2000	SC Langnau	SUI U20	2	1	1	2	4	—	—	—	—	—
1999–2000	SC Langnau	NLA	38	3	5	8	41	—	—	—	—	—
2000–01	SC Langnau	SUI U20	3	3	2	5	2	—	—	—	—	—
2000–01	SC Langnau	NLA	30	1	2	3	22	—	—	—	—	—
2001–02	SC Langnau	NLA	43	2	4	6	16	—	—	—	—	—
2002–03	SC Langnau	NLA	43	9	5	14	26	—	—	—	—	—
2003–04	HC Lugano	NLA	47	8	14	22	24	16	1	0	1	8
2004–05	HC Lugano	NLA	43	2	13	15	38	5	1	1	2	0
2005–06	HC Lugano	NLA	40	1	10	11	28	14	1	2	3	8
2006–07	HC Lugano	NLA	15	3	4	7	12	6	1	2	3	2
2007–08	HC Lugano	NLA	23	1	3	4	33	—	—	—	—	—
2008–09	HC Lugano	NLA	2	0	0	0	2	6	0	0	0	2
2009–10	HC Lugano	NLA	49	5	8	13	14	4	0	1	1	0
2010–11	HC Lugano	NLA	41	5	13	18	38	—	—	—	—	—
2011–12	HC Lugano	NLA	40	9	11	20	24	2	0	0	0	0
2012–13	HC Lugano	NLA	21	4	6	10	14	7	0	0	0	2
2013–14	HC Lugano	NLA	40	4	8	12	22	5	0	1	1	2
2014–15	HC Lugano	NLA	33	3	8	11	20	6	1	2	3	2
2015–16	HC Lugano	NLA	45	2	8	10	34	15	0	0	0	6
2016–17	HC Lugano	NLA	41	3	2	5	34	11	0	0	0	10
NDA/NLA totals			641	65	124	189	444	102	5	9	14	42

=== International ===
Year	Team	Event	GP	G	A	Pts	PIM
1999	Switzerland	WJC18	7	0	0	0	4
2001	Switzerland	WJC	7	0	1	1	8
2002	Switzerland	WC	6	0	1	1	2
2004	Switzerland	WC	6	0	0	0	2
2006	Switzerland	OG	6	0	0	0	4
2007	Switzerland	WC	3	0	0	0	2
2010	Switzerland	WC	7	0	0	0	0
Junior totals			14	0	1	1	12
Senior totals			28	0	1	1	10
