= Mathias Månsson =

Swedish ice hockey player

- Born: September 20, 1981 (age 43); Gävle, Sweden
- Height: 6 ft 2 in (188 cm)
- Weight: 207 lb (94 kg; 14 st 11 lb)
- Position: Forward
- Shot: Left
- Played for: Brynäs IF; Skellefteå AIK; Rögle BK; KalPa; Södertälje SK
- National team: Sweden
- NHL draft: Undrafted
- Playing career: 2000–2018

Mathias Månsson (born September 20, 1981) is a former Swedish professional ice hockey player who played in the Swedish Hockey League (SHL). He also played for KalPa in the SM-liiga.
