= Tuomo Ruutu =

Finnish ice hockey player (born 1983)

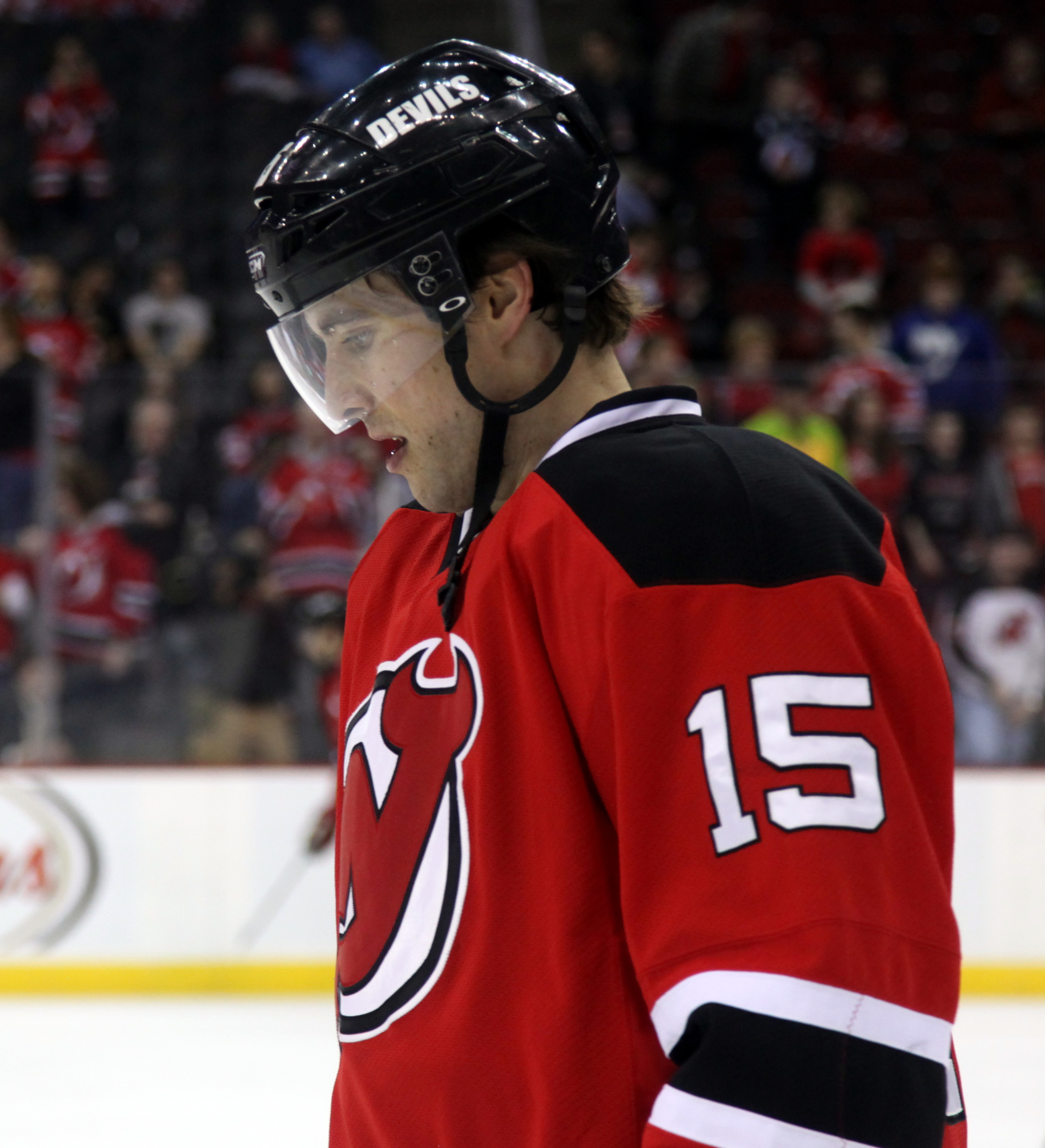
- Ruutu with the New Jersey Devils in 2014
- Born: 16 February 1983 (age 43) Vantaa, Finland
- Height: 6 ft 0 in (183 cm)
- Weight: 200 lb (91 kg; 14 st 4 lb)
- Position: Left wing
- Shot: Left
- Played for: HIFK; Jokerit; Chicago Blackhawks; Carolina Hurricanes; New Jersey Devils; HC Davos
- National team: Finland
- NHL draft: 9th overall, 2001; Chicago Blackhawks
- Playing career: 1999–2017

Tuomo Iisakki Ruutu (born 16 February 1983) is a Finnish former professional ice hockey forward and current assistant coach with the Florida Panthers of the National Hockey League. Ruutu was drafted in the first round, ninth overall, at the 2001 NHL entry draft by the Chicago Blackhawks, the team he spent the first four seasons of his National Hockey League (NHL) career with, Ruutu has also played in the NHL for the Carolina Hurricanes and New Jersey Devils, before finishing his career with Davos of the Swiss National League (NL).

== Playing career ==
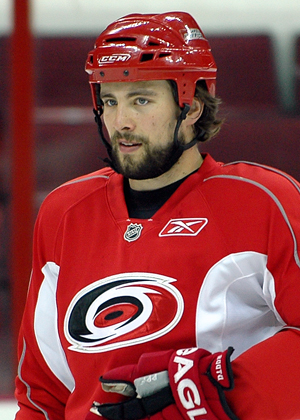
Ruutu as a member of the Carolina Hurricanes in 2009.

Ruutu started out playing for HIFK in the Finnish SM-liiga in the 1999–2000 season, and moved to Jokerit for the next two seasons. In 2002, he returned to HIFK for one more season. He was drafted by the Chicago Blackhawks in the 2001 NHL entry draft, as their first-round pick, ninth overall. He then moved to North America in 2003, playing a full 82 games with the Blackhawks in the 2003–04 season.

Ruutu did not play during the 2004–05 NHL lockout, opting to take the time to recover from injuries, but provided commentary on Finnish television during the 2005 IIHF World Championship, along with fellow Finnish NHLer Ville Nieminen. Ruutu returned to the NHL after the lockout but his 2005–06 season was cut short, first by a back injury that kept him out of the game for most of the fall, then by an ankle injury sustained in January that required season-ending surgery.

After an unimpressive showing at the 2006 IIHF World Championship, Ruutu contemplated retirement from playing professionally. However, this notion was put to rest when Ruutu signed a two-year, $3.75 million contract extension with Chicago on 13 September.

During the 2007–08 season, on 26 February 2008, at the NHL trade deadline, the Blackhawks traded Ruutu to the Carolina Hurricanes in exchange for Andrew Ladd. The Hurricanes promptly signed Ruutu to a one-year contract worth $2.25 million.

On 23 July 2009, the Hurricanes signed Ruutu to a three-year, $11.4 million contract extension, paying $3 million in 2009–10, $4 million in 2010–11 and $4.4 million in 2011–12.

On 22 February 2012, the Hurricanes signed Ruutu to a four-year contract extension worth $19 million. The deal paid Ruutu $4 million in 2012–13 and $5 million per year in the remaining years; it also included a no-trade clause for the first three years of the contract.

Just hours before the end of the NHL trade deadline on 5 March 2014, Ruutu was traded to the New Jersey Devils in exchange for centre Andrei Loktionov.

In the 2015–16 season, Ruutu could not stay healthy and tallied one assist in the final game of the season. Ruutu was not re-signed by the Devils once his contract expired, becoming an unrestricted free agent on 1 July 2016. After going through the summer unsigned, Ruutu agreed to a professional tryout with the Vancouver Canucks on 13 September.

On 11 October 2016, Canucks general manager Jim Benning announced Ruutu had been released from his PTO contract.

On 28 October 2016, Ruutu was signed by HC Davos for the remainder of the season as a replacement for the injured Daniel Rahimi. He made his NLA debut on 11 November 2016 and scored his first goal that same day in a 3–2 loss in Geneva against Genève-Servette HC.

== International play ==
Medal record

Representing Finland

Ice hockey

Olympic Games
Bronze medal – third place	2010 Vancouver	
Bronze medal – third place	2014 Sochi	

World Championships
Gold medal – first place	2011 Slovakia	
Silver medal – second place	2007 Russia	
Bronze medal – third place	2006 Latvia	
Bronze medal – third place	2008 Canada	

World Junior Championships
Silver medal – second place	2001 Russia	
Bronze medal – third place	2002 Czech Republic	
Bronze medal – third place	2003 Canada	

World U18 Championships
Gold medal – first place	2000 Switzerland	

World Cup
Silver medal – second place	2004 Canada	

Ruutu represented Finland at the 2004 World Cup of Hockey and scored his first goal with the Finns in the final against Canada.

At the 2010 Winter Olympics in Vancouver, Ruutu won the bronze medal with Finland, and in 2011, he added a World Championship gold medal to his international resume. He has earned a medal in each of the 11 major international tournaments he has competed in.

Ruutu also played for Finland at the 2014 Winter Olympics in Sochi, as the Finns finished in third place, routing the United States 5–0 to claim bronze, with Ruutu recording an assist on Juuso Hietanen's goal.

Ruutu played for Finland again at the 2015 World Championships, where the Finns were eliminated at the quarterfinal against the Czech Republic, marking just the second time Ruutu did not win a medal from an international tournament he took part in, the other being the 2004 World Cup where there's nothing awarded to anyone other than the tournament winners.

== Coaching career ==
Ruutu was hired as an assistant coach with the Florida Panthers on June 29, 2021. He was part of the coaching staff when the Panthers won the Stanley Cup in the 2023-2024 and 2024-2025 NHL seasons. Prior to his hiring with Florida, Ruutu had spent two years as assistant director of Player Development with the New York Rangers.

== Career statistics ==
=== Regular season and playoffs ===
			Regular season					Playoffs
Season	Team	League	GP	G	A	Pts	PIM	GP	G	A	Pts	PIM
1999–2000	HIFK	FIN U18	5	0	3	3	12	3	1	2	3	2
1999–2000	HIFK	FIN U20	35	11	16	27	32	3	0	1	1	4
1999–2000	HIFK	SM-l	1	0	0	0	2	—	—	—	—	—
2000–01	Jokerit	FIN U20	2	1	0	1	0	—	—	—	—	—
2000–01	Jokerit	SM-l	47	11	11	22	94	5	0	0	0	4
2001–02	Jokerit	SM-l	51	7	16	23	69	10	0	6	6	29
2002–03	HIFK	SM-l	30	12	15	27	24	—	—	—	—	—
2003–04	Chicago Blackhawks	NHL	82	23	21	44	58	—	—	—	—	—
2005–06	Chicago Blackhawks	NHL	15	2	3	5	31	—	—	—	—	—
2006–07	Chicago Blackhawks	NHL	71	17	21	38	95	—	—	—	—	—
2007–08	Chicago Blackhawks	NHL	60	6	15	21	75	—	—	—	—	—
2007–08	Carolina Hurricanes	NHL	17	4	7	11	16	—	—	—	—	—
2008–09	Carolina Hurricanes	NHL	79	26	28	54	79	16	1	3	4	8
2009–10	Carolina Hurricanes	NHL	54	14	21	35	50	—	—	—	—	—
2010–11	Carolina Hurricanes	NHL	82	19	38	57	54	—	—	—	—	—
2011–12	Carolina Hurricanes	NHL	72	18	16	34	50	—	—	—	—	—
2012–13	Carolina Hurricanes	NHL	17	4	5	9	8	—	—	—	—	—
2013–14	Carolina Hurricanes	NHL	57	5	11	16	34	—	—	—	—	—
2013–14	New Jersey Devils	NHL	19	3	5	8	10	—	—	—	—	—
2014–15	New Jersey Devils	NHL	77	7	6	13	28	—	—	—	—	—
2015–16	New Jersey Devils	NHL	33	0	1	1	8	—	—	—	—	—
2016–17	HC Davos	NLA	26	5	7	12	22	6	0	1	1	2
SM-l totals			129	30	42	72	181	15	0	6	6	33
NHL totals			735	148	198	346	596	16	1	3	4	8

=== International ===
Year	Team	Event	GP	G	A	Pts	PIM
2000	Finland	WJC18	7	6	2	8	0
2001	Finland	WJC	7	1	3	4	4
2002	Finland	WJC	7	4	1	5	10
2003	Finland	WJC	7	2	8	10	6
2004	Finland	WCH	6	1	2	3	4
2006	Finland	WC	9	0	0	0	49
2007	Finland	WC	8	3	3	6	20
2008	Finland	WC	9	4	2	6	8
2010	Finland	OG	6	1	0	1	2
2011	Finland	WC	9	6	0	6	8
2014	Finland	OG	6	1	4	5	2
2015	Finland	WC	8	1	1	2	4
Junior totals			28	13	14	27	20
Senior totals			61	17	12	29	97

== Personal life ==
Ruutu is the younger brother of Jarkko Ruutu, a former ice hockey player, as well as Ottawa Senators European scout Mikko Ruutu.

== See also ==
- Notable families in the NHL
- List of Olympic medalist families

Awards and achievements
Preceded by Pavel Vorobiev	Chicago Blackhawks first-round draft pick 2001	Succeeded by Adam Munro
