= Ville Hämäläinen =

Finnish ice hockey player

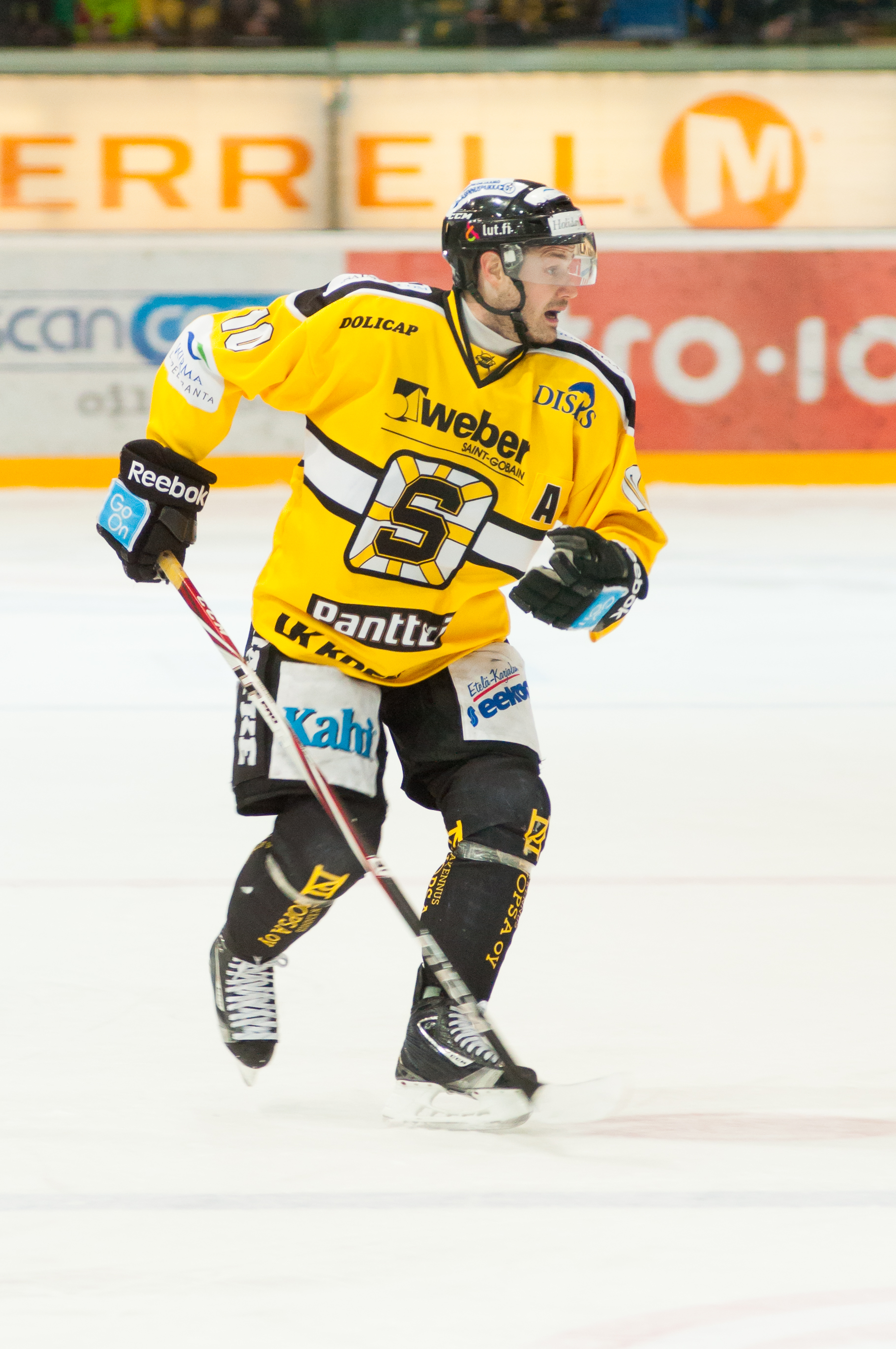
- Born: 6 July 1981 (age 44) Lappeenranta, Finland
- Height: 180 cm (5 ft 11 in)
- Weight: 80 kg (176 lb; 12 st 8 lb)
- Position: Forward
- Shot: Left
- Played for: SaiPa; KooKoo; Tappara; FPS; KalPa; HPK; Jokerit; Kiekko-Vantaa; Jukurit; Dresdner Eislöwen; Braehead Clan
- NHL draft: 251st overall, 2001; Calgary Flames
- Playing career: 2001–2018

Ville Hämäläinen (born 6 July 1981 in Lappeenranta) is a Finnish retired professional ice hockey player. He played in Liiga for SaiPa, Tappara, KalPa, HPK, Jokerit and Jukurit. He also played in DEL2 in Germany for Dresdner Eislöwen and the Elite Ice Hockey League with the Braehead Clan. He was drafted 251st overall by the Calgary Flames in the 2001 NHL entry draft.

== Career statistics ==
=== Regular season and playoffs ===
			Regular season					Playoffs
Season	Team	League	GP	G	A	Pts	PIM	GP	G	A	Pts	PIM
1996–97	SaiPa	FIN U16	28	13	30	43	48	—	—	—	—	—
1996–97	SaiPa	FIN.2 U18	—	—	—	—	—	7	6	9	15	12
1997–98	SaiPa	FIN.2 U18
1997–98	SaiPa	FIN.2 U20	31	8	27	35	24	—	—	—	—	—
1998–99	SaiPa	FIN U18	12	9	13	22	20	—	—	—	—	—
1998–99	SaiPa	FIN.2 U20	12	6	20	26	26	14	10	12	22	22
1998–99	SaiPa	SM-liiga	12	1	0	1	8	—	—	—	—	—
1999–2000	SaiPa	FIN.2 U20	1	2	2	4	2	2	1	1	2	2
1999–2000	SaiPa	SM-liiga	47	6	4	10	20	—	—	—	—	—
1999–2000	KooKoo	FIN.2	3	0	1	1	2	—	—	—	—	—
2000–01	SaiPa	FIN U20	1	1	1	2	0	—	—	—	—	—
2000–01	SaiPa	SM-liiga	42	0	4	4	8	—	—	—	—	—
2001–02	SaiPa	FIN U20	5	4	4	8	2	9	5	6	11	18
2001–02	SaiPa	SM-liiga	51	4	9	13	24	—	—	—	—	—
2002–03	Tappara	SM-liiga	35	1	2	3	6	6	0	0	0	2
2002–03	FPS	Mestis	13	4	8	12	6	—	—	—	—	—
2003–04	KalPa	Mestis	45	21	25	46	39	10	0	7	7	6
2004–05	KalPa	Mestis	44	13	26	39	40	9	2	7	9	2
2005–06	KalPa	SM-liiga	44	4	14	18	48	—	—	—	—	—
2006–07	KalPa	SM-liiga	56	3	19	22	32	—	—	—	—	—
2007–08	KalPa	SM-liiga	55	14	18	32	26	—	—	—	—	—
2008–09	HPK	SM-liiga	11	0	0	0	4	6	0	0	0	4
2009–10	HPK	SM-liiga	58	6	15	21	26	17	4	2	6	2
2010–11	Jokerit	SM-liiga	51	3	3	6	18	5	0	0	0	4
2011–12	Kiekko–Vantaa	Mestis	4	0	1	1	6	—	—	—	—	—
2011–12	HPK	SM-liiga	36	1	8	9	20	—	—	—	—	—
2012–13	SaiPa	SM-liiga	52	2	7	9	48	3	0	1	1	2
2013–14	SaiPa	Liiga	57	8	5	13	46	13	2	2	4	8
2014–15	SaiPa	Liiga	58	5	7	12	38	7	0	3	3	6
2015–16	SaiPa	Liiga	60	2	12	14	26	6	1	2	3	0
2016–17	Jukurit	Liiga	6	0	0	0	2	—	—	—	—	—
2016–17	Dresdner Eislöwen	GER.2	31	8	12	20	26	7	1	1	2	8
2017–18	Braehead Clan	EIHL	50	7	14	21	36	—	—	—	—	—
SM-liiga/Liiga totals			731	60	127	187	400	63	7	10	17	28

=== International ===
Year	Team	Event	GP	G	A	Pts	PIM
1999	Finland	WJC18	7	4	2	6	2
2000	Finland	WJC	7	3	2	5	2
2001	Finland	WJC	7	4	3	7	0
Junior totals			21	11	7	18	4
