= Vityaz Ice Palace =

Indoor sporting arena in Podolsk, Russia

Coordinates: 55°25′12.99″N 37°30′56.80″E

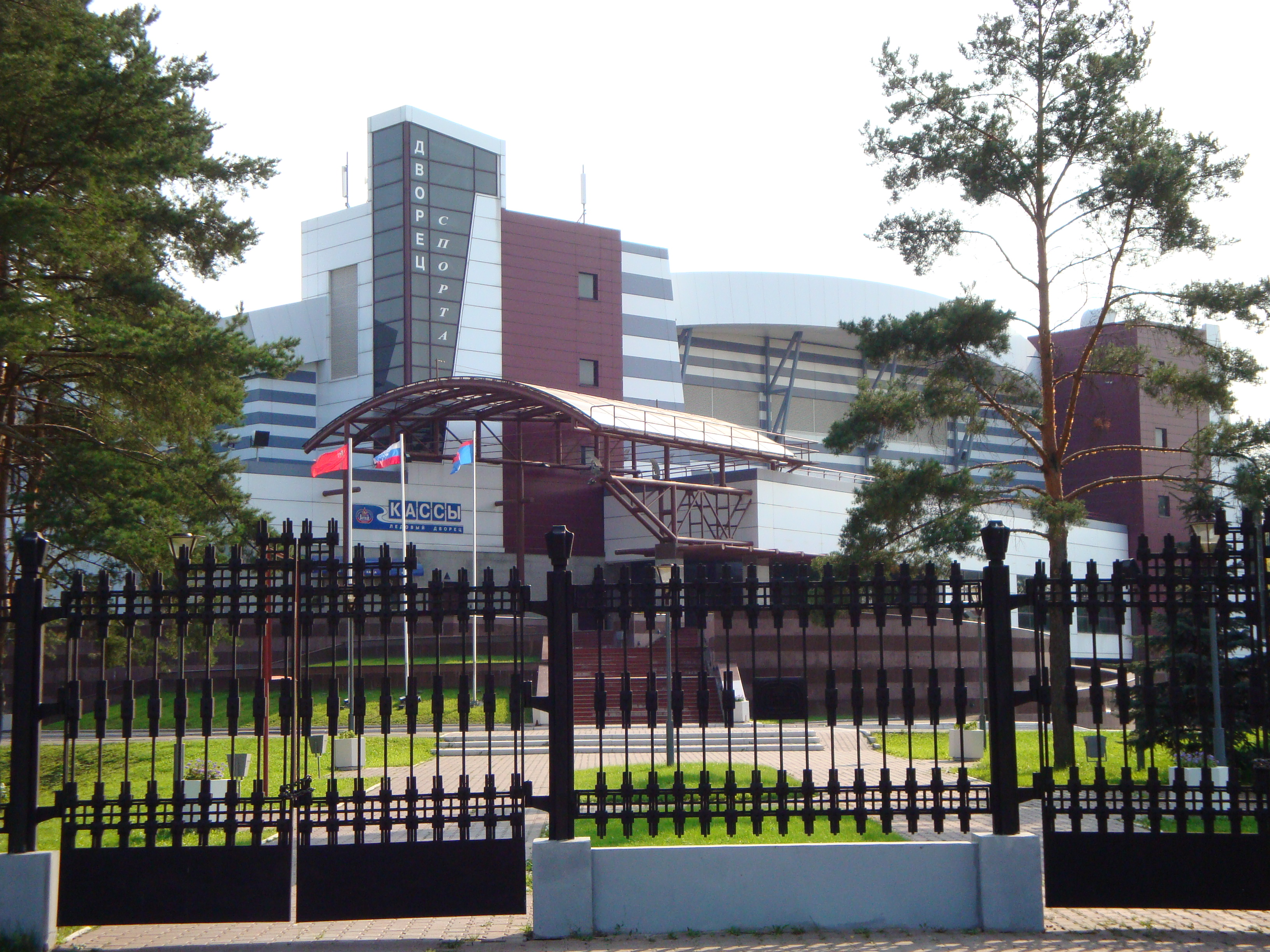
Vityaz Ice Palace in September 2008

Vityaz Ice Palace (Russian: Ледовый дворец «Витязь») is an indoor sporting arena located in Podolsk, Russia. The capacity of the arena is 5,500 and was built in 2000. The home games of Vityaz Podolsk and its junior team : Russkie Vityazi are played in the arena. Until 2006 it was the home arena of the HC MVD ice hockey team.
