= Jamie Lundmark =

Canadian ice hockey player (born 1981)

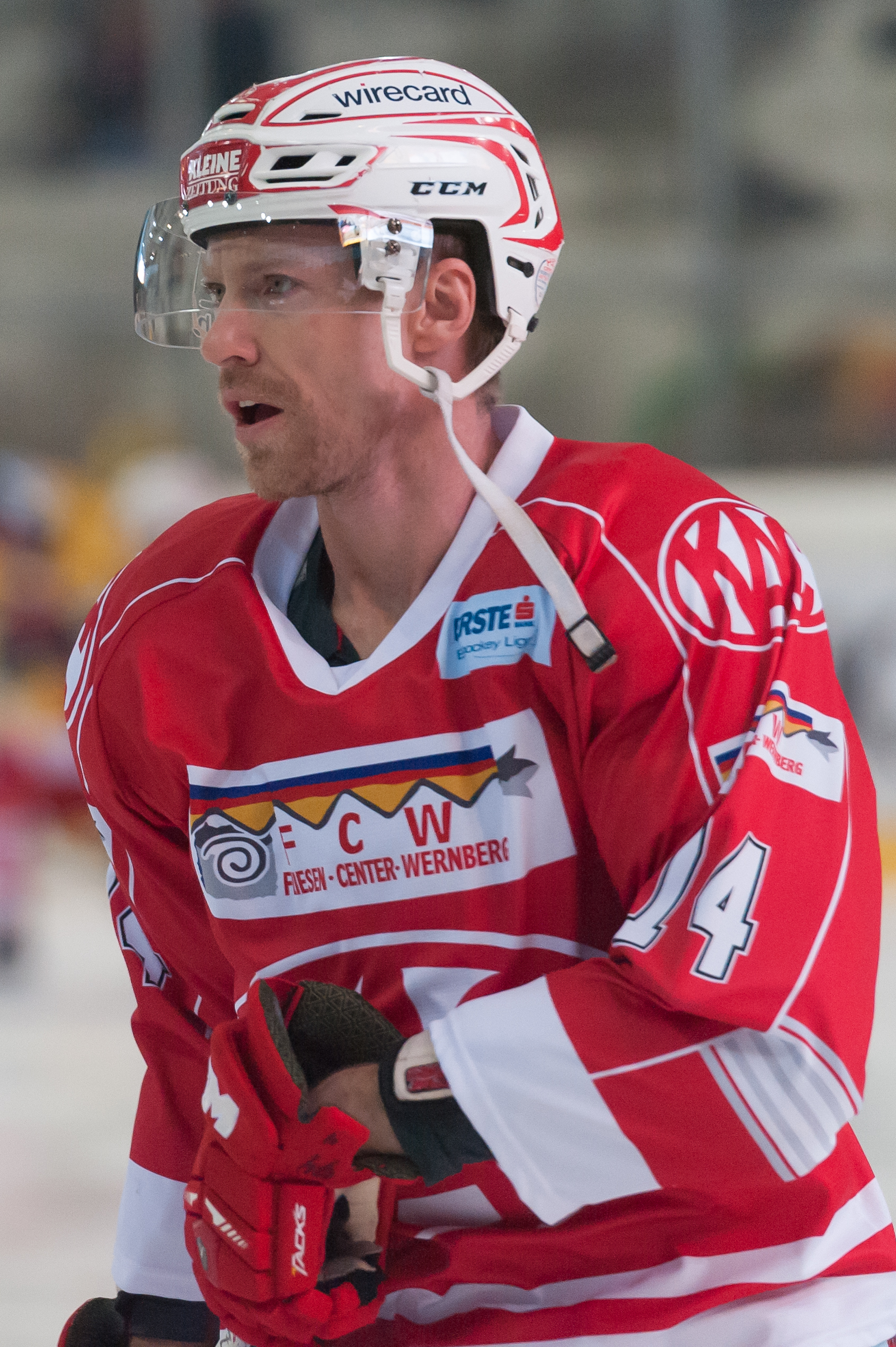
- Born: January 16, 1981 (age 45) Edmonton, Alberta, Canada
- Height: 6 ft 0 in (183 cm)
- Weight: 197 lb (89 kg; 14 st 1 lb)
- Position: Centre
- Shot: Right
- Played for: New York Rangers; Phoenix Coyotes; Calgary Flames; Los Angeles Kings; Toronto Maple Leafs; Timrå IK; Dinamo Riga; EC KAC
- NHL draft: 9th overall, 1999; New York Rangers
- Playing career: 2001–2018

Jamie Lundmark (born January 16, 1981) is a Canadian former professional ice hockey forward. A first-round draft pick of the New York Rangers, Lundmark played 295 games in the National Hockey League (NHL).

== Playing career ==
As a youth, Lundmark played in the 1995 Quebec International Pee-Wee Hockey Tournament with a minor ice hockey team from the Whitemud area of Edmonton.

Lundmark played junior hockey with the Alberta Junior Hockey League's St. Albert Saints and the Seattle Thunderbirds. Drafted in the first round, 9th overall by the New York Rangers in the 1999 NHL entry draft from the Moose Jaw Warriors, Lundmark played in the NHL with the Rangers, Phoenix Coyotes, Calgary Flames, Los Angeles Kings and Toronto Maple Leafs, as well as multiple teams in the American Hockey League (AHL). He played in Italy during the 2004–05 NHL lockout.

On January 29, 2007, he was traded along with two draft picks by the Flames to the Kings in exchange for former Flame Craig Conroy.

On July 27, 2007, Lundmark signed a one-year contract with HC Dynamo Moscow of the Russian Super League. In December 2007, Lundmark left Dynamo Moscow and returned to North America, joining the Lake Erie Monsters of the AHL.

On July 16, 2008, Lundmark was signed to a one-year, two-way deal by the Calgary Flames.

On February 13, 2010, Lundmark was claimed off waivers from Calgary by the Maple Leafs. A month later Lundmark scored his first goal as a member of the Maple Leafs in a 6-4 victory against the Edmonton Oilers on March 13, 2010.

On July 16, 2010, Lundmark signed as a free agent to a one-year, two-way contract with the Nashville Predators. Suffering an injury at the Predators training camp ahead of the 2010–11 season, he was later assigned to AHL affiliate, the Milwaukee Admirals. After 34 games with the Admirals, Lundmark left for Europe to sign with Swedish team, Timrå IK, for the remainder of the season on January 10, 2011.

On August 22, 2011, Lundmark was signed to a free agent deal with Latvian club Dinamo Riga of the Kontinental Hockey League (KHL). Marking his second stint in the top Russian league, Lundmark contributed with 16 points in 47 games to help Riga qualify for the playoffs.

In the off-season, Lundmark left Riga for Austria, signing a one-year contract with EC KAC of the Austrian Hockey League (EBEL). During the 2012–13 season, in which he guided Klagenfurt to the championship as their leading scorer and won the Ron Kennedy Trophy as the EBEL Most Valuable Player, he signed a two-year contract extension on March 7, 2013. In April 2015, he was handed another contract extension through the 2016–17 season.

Lundmark announced his retirement from professional hockey on March 20, 2018.

== Career statistics ==
=== Regular season and playoffs ===
			Regular season					Playoffs
Season	Team	League	GP	G	A	Pts	PIM	GP	G	A	Pts	PIM
1996–97	St. Albert Saints	AJHL	35	10	9	19	8	—	—	—	—	—
1997–98	St. Albert Saints	AJHL	57	33	58	91	171	19	13	18	31	5
1998–99	Moose Jaw Warriors	WHL	70	40	51	91	121	11	5	4	9	24
1999–2000	Moose Jaw Warriors	WHL	37	21	27	48	33	—	—	—	—	—
2000–01	Seattle Thunderbirds	WHL	52	35	42	77	49	9	4	4	8	16
2001–02	Hartford Wolf Pack	AHL	79	27	32	59	56	10	3	4	7	16
2002–03	Hartford Wolf Pack	AHL	22	9	9	18	18	2	0	0	0	0
2002–03	New York Rangers	NHL	55	8	11	19	16	—	—	—	—	—
2003–04	New York Rangers	NHL	56	2	8	10	33	—	—	—	—	—
2004–05	Hartford Wolf Pack	AHL	64	14	27	41	146	6	2	4	6	8
2004–05	HC Bolzano	ITA	14	10	10	20	22	—	—	—	—	—
2005–06	New York Rangers	NHL	3	1	0	1	6	—	—	—	—	—
2005–06	San Antonio Rampage	AHL	4	1	2	3	2	—	—	—	—	—
2005–06	Phoenix Coyotes	NHL	38	5	13	18	36	—	—	—	—	—
2005–06	Calgary Flames	NHL	12	4	6	10	20	4	0	1	1	7
2006–07	Calgary Flames	NHL	39	0	4	4	31	—	—	—	—	—
2006–07	Los Angeles Kings	NHL	29	7	2	9	25	—	—	—	—	—
2007–08	Dynamo Moscow	RSL	17	2	1	3	31	—	—	—	—	—
2007–08	Lake Erie Monsters	AHL	51	13	20	33	71	—	—	—	—	—
2008–09	Quad City Flames	AHL	54	15	37	52	31	—	—	—	—	—
2008–09	Calgary Flames	NHL	27	8	8	16	17	2	0	0	0	0
2009–10	Abbotsford Heat	AHL	32	9	12	21	64	—	—	—	—	—
2009–10	Calgary Flames	NHL	21	4	5	9	4	—	—	—	—	—
2009–10	Toronto Maple Leafs	NHL	15	1	2	3	16	—	—	—	—	—
2010–11	Milwaukee Admirals	AHL	34	6	13	19	22	—	—	—	—	—
2010–11	Timrå IK	SEL	18	3	7	10	12	—	—	—	—	—
2011–12	Dinamo Riga	KHL	47	8	8	16	52	7	0	1	1	6
2012–13	EC KAC	EBEL	51	29	29	58	34	13	5	4	9	8
2013–14	EC KAC	EBEL	37	12	16	28	18	—	—	—	—	—
2014–15	EC KAC	EBEL	54	24	25	49	73	9	6	7	13	6
2015–16	EC KAC	EBEL	54	21	32	53	26	7	3	5	8	2
2016–17	EC KAC	EBEL	51	26	25	51	48	13	6	3	9	24
2017–18	EC KAC	EBEL	43	8	16	24	38	3	0	1	1	0
NHL totals			295	40	59	99	204	6	0	1	1	7

=== International ===
Medal record

Representing Canada

Ice hockey

World Junior Championships
Bronze medal – third place	2000 Skellefteå	
Bronze medal – third place	2001 Moscow	

Year	Team	Event	Result	GP	G	A	Pts	PIM
2000	Canada	WJC	3rd place, bronze medalist(s)	7	2	3	5	0
2001	Canada	WJC	3rd place, bronze medalist(s)	7	4	3	7	6
Junior totals				14	6	6	12	6

== Awards and honours ==
Award	Year
WHL
All-Rookie Team	1999
East Second All-Star Team	1999
CHL All-Rookie Team	1999
West First All-Star Team	2001
EBEL MVP	2013

Awards and achievements
Preceded by Pavel Brendl	New York Rangers first-round draft pick 1999	Succeeded by Dan Blackburn
