= Maxime Ouellet =

Canadian ice hockey player (born 1981)

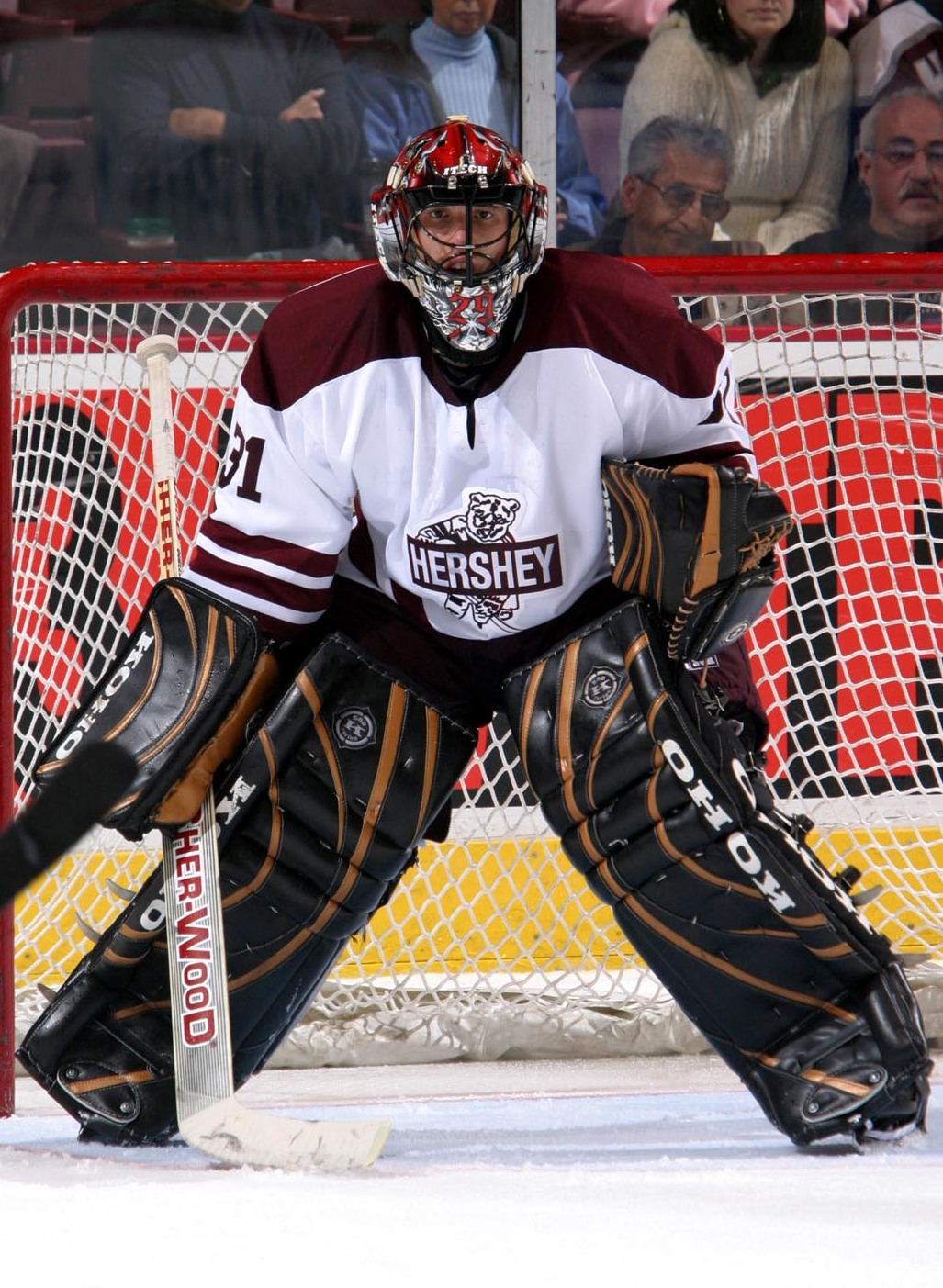
- Ouellet with the Hershey Bears in 2005
- Born: June 17, 1981 (age 44) Beauport, Quebec, Canada
- Height: 6 ft 2 in (188 cm)
- Weight: 195 lb (88 kg; 13 st 13 lb)
- Position: Goaltender
- Caught: Left
- Played for: Philadelphia Flyers; Washington Capitals; Vancouver Canucks
- NHL draft: 22nd overall, 1999; Philadelphia Flyers
- Playing career: 2000–2009

Maxime Ouellet (born June 17, 1981) is a Canadian former professional ice hockey goaltender who played in the National Hockey League (NHL) for the Philadelphia Flyers, Washington Capitals and Vancouver Canucks from 2000 to 2006. He also played several years in the American Hockey League, retiring in 2009. Internationally he played for the Canadian national junior team at both the 2000 and 2001 World Junior Championships, winning a bronze medal each year.

== Playing career ==
Medal record

Representing Canada

World Junior Championships
Bronze medal – third place	2000 Sweden	
Bronze medal – third place	2001 Russia	

As a youth, Ouellet played in the 1994 and 1995 Quebec International Pee-Wee Hockey Tournaments with a minor ice hockey team from Beauport, Quebec City.

Ouellet was drafted by the Philadelphia Flyers in the first round, 22nd overall at the 1999 NHL entry draft. He later was traded with a first, second, and third round draft choice in 2002 NHL entry draft to the Washington Capitals for Adam Oates. He holds several records for the former AHL affiliate of the Washington Capitals, the Portland Pirates. On December 2, 2005, the Washington Capitals traded Ouellet to the Canucks in exchange for a fifth round selection in the 2006 NHL entry draft (Maxime Lacroix).

After not playing to start the 2006–07 season, in late December 2006, Ouellet was signed by the Portland Pirates to goal tend alongside Dov Grumet-Morris. One week later in January 2007, he left Portland without playing a game and was reportedly trying to sign with a European team. In January 2007, Ouellet signed to a contract with the German hockey club Kassel Huskies.

Ouellet was signed by the New York Islanders to a minor-league contract with the Bridgeport Sound Tigers on July 26, 2007. After failing to make the team, he signed a contract on November 11, 2007, with the Salzburg Red Bulls of the Erste Bank Eishockey Liga in Austria.

On January 24, 2008, Ouellet signed a contract with the Mississippi Sea Wolves of the ECHL. He was traded from the Sea Wolves to the Trenton Devils where he played 5 games with a 3.21 GAA and a 0.877 save percentage.

On October 16, 2008, it was announced that Ouellet had signed with the St. Marie Poutrelles Delta of the LNAH.

== Career statistics ==
=== Regular season and playoffs ===
			Regular season										Playoffs
Season	Team	League	GP	W	L	T	OTL	MIN	GA	SO	GAA	SV%	GP	W	L	MIN	GA	SO	GAA	SV%
1996–97	Sainte-Foy Gouverneurs	QAAA	29	16	8	0	—	1470	81	0	2.75	—	9	4	5	555	31	0	3.37	—
1997–98	Quebec Remparts	QMJHL	24	12	7	1	—	1188	66	0	3.33	.893	7	3	1	305	16	0	3.15	.892
1998–99	Quebec Remparts	QMJHL	59	40	12	6	—	3447	155	3	2.70	.909	13	6	7	803	41	1	3.06	.910
1999–00	Quebec Remparts	QMJHL	53	31	16	4	—	2984	133	2	2.67	.916	11	7	4	638	28	2	2.63	.912
2000–01	Rouyn-Noranda Huskies	QMJHL	25	18	6	1	—	1471	65	3	2.65	.913	8	4	4	490	25	0	3.06	.904
2000–01	Philadelphia Flyers	NHL	2	0	1	0	—	76	3	0	2.38	.889	—	—	—	—	—	—	—	—
2000–01	Philadelphia Phantoms	AHL	2	1	0	0	—	86	4	0	2.78	.926	—	—	—	—	—	—	—	—
2001–02	Philadelphia Phantoms	AHL	41	16	13	8	—	2294	104	1	2.72	.911	—	—	—	—	—	—	—	—
2001–02	Portland Pirates	AHL	6	3	3	0	—	358	17	0	2.85	.923	—	—	—	—	—	—	—	—
2002–03	Portland Pirates	AHL	48	22	16	7	—	2773	111	7	2.40	.929	2	1	1	120	8	0	4.00	.889
2003–04	Washington Capitals	NHL	6	2	3	1	—	365	19	1	3.12	.910	—	—	—	—	—	—	—	—
2003–04	Portland Pirates	AHL	52	15	29	8	—	3050	101	10	1.99	.930	5	2	2	303	8	0	1.59	.942
2004–05	Portland Pirates	AHL	40	15	20	3	—	2305	111	0	2.89	.911	—	—	—	—	—	—	—	—
2005–06	Hershey Bears	AHL	1	0	0	—	0	41	5	0	7.37	.737	—	—	—	—	—	—	—	—
2005–06	Vancouver Canucks	NHL	4	0	2	—	1	222	12	0	3.25	.894	—	—	—	—	—	—	—	—
2005–06	Manitoba Moose	AHL	16	9	7	—	0	946	46	0	2.92	.894	3	0	1	127	6	0	2.85	.919
2006–07	Kassel Huskies	GER-2	2	—	—	—	—	—	—	—	3.53	—	—	—	—	—	—	—	—	—
2007–08	Trenton Devils	ECHL	5	3	2	—	0	299	16	0	3.21	.887	—	—	—	—	—	—	—	—
2008–09	Sainte-Marie Poutrelles Delta	LNAH	9	—	—	—	—	—	—	—	5.42	.870	—	—	—	—	—	—	—	—
AHL totals			206	81	88	26	0	11853	499	18	2.53	.919	10	3	4	550	24	0	2.61	.915
NHL totals			12	2	6	1	1	663	34	1	3.08	.903	—	—	—	—	—	—	—	—

=== International ===
Year	Team	Event	GP	W	L	T	MIN	GA	SO	GAA	SV%
2000	Canada	WJC	6	3	2	2	360	11	0	1.83	—
2001	Canada	WJC	7	4	2	1	398	10	1	1.51	—
Junior totals			13	7	4	3	758	21	1	1.66	—

Preceded by Simon Gagne	Philadelphia Flyers' first-round draft pick 1999	Succeeded by Justin Williams
