= Daniel Ljungkvist =

Swedish ice hockey player

- Born: September 18, 1981 (age 43); Lannaskede, SWE
- Height: 6 ft 0 in (183 cm)
- Weight: 198 lb (90 kg; 14 st 2 lb)
- Position: Defence
- Shot: Left
- Played for: HV71; Södertälje SK; Växjö Lakers HC; IK Oskarshamn
- Playing career: 2000–2021

Daniel Ljungkvist (born September 18, 1981) is a Swedish professional ice hockey player currently with the IK Oskarshamn team in the Swedish second league.

== Career statistics ==
			Regular season					Playoffs
Season	Team	League	GP	G	A	Pts	PIM	GP	G	A	Pts	PIM
1997–98	HV71 J18	J18 Div.1	—	—	—	—	—	—	—	—	—	—
1997–98	HV71 J20	J20 SuperElit	9	1	1	2	4	—	—	—	—	—
1998–99	HV71 J18	J18 Elit	—	—	—	—	—	—	—	—	—	—
1998–99	HV71 J20	J20 SuperElit	30	4	6	10	—	—	—	—	—	—
1999–00	HV71 J20	J20 SuperElit	25	3	7	10	36	2	0	1	1	8
1999–00	HV71	Elitserien	20	0	0	0	8	4	0	0	0	0
2000–01	HV71 J20	J20 SuperElit	5	2	2	4	10	3	1	0	1	4
2000–01	HV71	Elitserien	45	1	3	4	14	—	—	—	—	—
2001–02	HV71	Elitserien	50	1	5	6	30	8	0	0	0	4
2002–03	HV71	Elitserien	50	4	2	6	30	7	1	0	1	8
2003–04	HV71 J20	J20 SuperElit	3	0	3	3	2	—	—	—	—	—
2003–04	HV71	Elitserien	42	1	2	3	30	17	0	3	3	29
2003–04	Södertälje SK	Elitserien	5	0	0	0	6	—	—	—	—	—
2004–05	HV71	Elitserien	14	1	1	2	12	—	—	—	—	—
2004–05	Växjö Lakers HC	Allsvenskan	9	0	1	1	14	—	—	—	—	—
2004–05	IK Oskarshamn	Allsvenskan	13	2	2	4	8	10	0	0	0	2
2005–06	Södertälje SK	Elitserien	47	0	2	2	44	—	—	—	—	—
2006–07	Södertälje SK	HockeyAllsvenskan	44	6	20	26	36	10	1	0	1	14
2007–08	Södertälje SK	Elitserien	10	0	0	0	6	—	—	—	—	—
2008–09	Södertälje SK	Elitserien	46	0	3	3	18	—	—	—	—	—
2009–10	IK Oskarshamn	HockeyAllsvenskan	42	3	8	11	52	10	0	5	5	24
2010–11	IK Oskarshamn	HockeyAllsvenskan	49	1	17	18	40	—	—	—	—	—
2011–12	IK Oskarshamn	HockeyAllsvenskan	47	2	9	11	32	6	0	0	0	4
2012–13	IK Oskarshamn	HockeyAllsvenskan	48	0	6	6	42	4	0	1	1	6
2013–14	IK Oskarshamn	HockeyAllsvenskan	47	2	6	8	32	—	—	—	—	—
2013–14	Boro/Vetlanda HC	Division 2	1	0	0	0	0	—	—	—	—	—
2014–15	IK Oskarshamn	HockeyAllsvenskan	22	0	1	1	20	—	—	—	—	—
2015–16	IK Oskarshamn	HockeyAllsvenskan	51	1	6	7	22	5	0	1	1	4
2016–17	Boro/Vetlanda HC	Division 2	33	8	12	20	57	—	—	—	—	—
2016–17	IK Oskarshamn	HockeyAllsvenskan	3	0	1	1	2	—	—	—	—	—
2017–18	Boro/Vetlanda HC	Division 2	22	1	13	14	22	—	—	—	—	—
2018–19	Boro/Vetlanda HC	Division 2	3	1	0	1	2	—	—	—	—	—
2020–21	Boro/Vetlanda HC	Division 2	9	0	5	5	8	—	—	—	—	—
Elitserien totals			329	8	18	26	198	26	1	3	4	37
HockeyAllsvenskan totals			353	15	74	89	278	35	1	7	8	52
