= Bob Clarke Trophy =

Annual junior ice hockey league award created 1966

The Bob Clarke Trophy is awarded annually to the player who leads the Western Hockey League in points scoring during the regular season. In both years Bob "Bobby" Clarke played in the WHL, he captured the League scoring title. In 1968–69, Clarke's Flin Flon Bombers captured the League Championship. His NHL career spanned 15 seasons with the Philadelphia Flyers, in which time he captained the team to a pair of Stanley Cups. He was awarded the Hart Trophy as the NHL's MVP three times, the Masterton Trophy and the Selke Trophy once each, and was also named an All-Star four times. He was inducted into the Hockey Hall of Fame in 1987.

Originally the Bob Brownridge Trophy (including the two seasons that Clarke was the recipient), and later known as the Bob Brownridge Memorial Trophy. Saskatchewan born Brownridge (1918–1972) was a player with the Eastern Hockey League's New York Rovers (1938–1941), leaving to serve with the Royal Canadian Air Force in World War II, then played post-war with the Western Canada Senior Hockey League's Calgary Stampeders (1945–1949), winning the 1946 Allan Cup. He retired and became a businessman in Calgary, later the founding owner (1966) of the WHL's Calgary Centennials. In 1971, he secured a founding World Hockey Association (WHA) franchise, to be called the Calgary Broncos. However, after the February 1972 inaugural WHA draft, and before the October 1972 start of the first WHA season, Brownridge unexpectedly died and the team folded.

== List of winners ==
Bob Brownridge Trophy
Season	Winner	Team	Points
1966–67	Gerry Pinder	Saskatoon Blades	140 (78G, 62A)
1967–68	Bobby Clarke	Flin Flon Bombers	168 (51G, 117A)
1968–69	Bobby Clarke	Flin Flon Bombers	137 (51G, 86A)
1969–70	Reggie Leach	Flin Flon Bombers	111 (65G, 46A)
1970–71	Chuck Arnason	Flin Flon Bombers	163 (79G, 84A)
1971–72	Tom Lysiak	Medicine Hat Tigers	143 (46G, 97A)
Bob Brownridge Memorial Trophy
1972–73	Tom Lysiak	Medicine Hat Tigers	154 (58G, 96A)
1973–74	Ron Chipperfield	Brandon Wheat Kings	162 (90G, 72A)
1974–75	Mel Bridgman	Victoria Cougars	157 (66G, 91A)
1975–76	Bernie Federko	Saskatoon Blades	187 (72G, 115A)
1976–77	Bill Derlago	Brandon Wheat Kings	178 (96G, 82A)
1977–78	Brian Propp	Brandon Wheat Kings	182 (70G, 112A)
1978–79	Brian Propp	Brandon Wheat Kings	194 (94G, 100A)
1979–80	Doug Wickenheiser	Regina Pats	170 (89G, 81A)
1980–81	Brian Varga	Regina Pats	160 (64G, 96A)
1981–82	Jock Callander	Regina Pats	190 (79G, 111A)
1982–83	Dale Derkatch	Regina Pats	179 (84G, 95A)
1983–84	Ray Ferraro	Brandon Wheat Kings	192 (108G, 84A)
1984–85	Cliff Ronning	New Westminster Bruins	197 (89G, 108A)
1985–86	Rob Brown	Kamloops Blazers	173 (58G, 115A)
1986–87^{1}	(East) Craig Endean	Regina Pats	146 (69G, 77A)
	(West) Rob Brown	Kamloops Blazers	212 (76G, 136A)
Bob Clarke Trophy
Season	Winner	Team	Points
1987–88	(tie) Joe Sakic	Swift Current Broncos	160 (78G, 82A)
	(tie) Theoren Fleury	Moose Jaw Warriors	160 (68G, 92A)
1988–89	Dennis Holland	Portland Winter Hawks	167 (82G, 85A)
1989–90	Len Barrie	Kamloops Blazers	185 (85G, 100A)
1990–91	Ray Whitney	Spokane Chiefs	185 (67G, 118A)
1991–92	Kevin St. Jaques	Lethbridge Hurricanes	140 (65G, 75A)
1992–93	Jason Krywulak	Swift Current Broncos	162 (81G, 81A)
1993–94	Lonny Bohonos	Portland Winter Hawks	152 (62G, 90A)
1994–95	Daymond Langkow	Tri-City Americans	140 (67G, 73A)
1995–96	Mark Deyell	Saskatoon Blades	159 (61G, 98A)
1996–97	Todd Robinson	Portland Winter Hawks	134 (38G, 96A)
1997–98	Sergei Varlamov	Swift Current Broncos	119 (66G, 53A)
1998–99	Pavel Brendl	Calgary Hitmen	134 (73G, 61A)
1999–2000	Brad Moran	Calgary Hitmen	120 (48G, 72A)
2000–01	Justin Mapletoft	Red Deer Rebels	120 (43G, 77A)
2001–02	Nathan Barrett	Lethbridge Hurricanes	107 (45G, 62A)
2002–03	Erik Christensen	Kamloops Blazers	108 (54G, 54A)
2003–04	Tyler Redenbach	Swift Current Broncos	105 (31G, 74A)
2004–05	Eric Fehr	Brandon Wheat Kings	111 (59G, 52A)
2005–06	Troy Brouwer	Moose Jaw Warriors	102 (49G, 53A)
2006–07	Zach Hamill	Everett Silvertips	93 (32G, 61A)
2007–08	Mark Santorelli	Chilliwack Bruins	101 (27G, 74A)
2008–09	Casey Pierro-Zabotel	Vancouver Giants	115 (36G, 79A)
2009–10	Brandon Kozun	Calgary Hitmen	107 (32G, 75A)
2010–11	Linden Vey	Medicine Hat Tigers	116 (46G, 70A)
2011–12	Brendan Shinnimin	Tri-City Americans	134 (58G, 76A)
2012–13	Brendan Leipsic	Portland Winterhawks	120 (49G, 71A)
2013–14	Mitch Holmberg	Spokane Chiefs	118 (62G, 56A)
2014–15	Oliver Bjorkstrand	Portland Winterhawks	118 (63G, 55A)
2015–16	Adam Brooks	Regina Pats	120 (38G, 82A)
2016–17	Sam Steel	Regina Pats	131 (50G, 81A)
2017–18	Jayden Halbgewachs	Moose Jaw Warriors	129 (70G, 59A)
2018–19	Joachim Blichfeld	Portland Winterhawks	114 (53G, 61A)
2019–20	Adam Beckman	Spokane Chiefs	107 (48G, 59A)
2020–21	Peyton Krebs	Winnipeg Ice	43 (13G, 30A)
2021–22	Arshdeep Bains	Red Deer Rebels	112 (43G, 69A)
2022–23	Connor Bedard	Regina Pats	143 (71G, 72A)
2023–24	Jagger Firkus	Moose Jaw Warriors	126 (61G, 65A)
2024–25	Andrew Cristall	Kelowna/Spokane	132 (48G, 84A)
2025–26	Markus Ruck	Medicine Hat Tigers	108 (21G, 87A)

- Blue background denotes also won CHL Top Scorer Award

^{1}The WHL handed out separate awards for the East and West divisions.

== See also ==
- CHL Top Scorer Award
- Eddie Powers Memorial Trophy - Top scorer of the Ontario Hockey League
- Jean Béliveau Trophy - Top scorer of the Quebec Major Junior Hockey League
