= Nick Holden =

Canadian ice hockey player (born 1987)

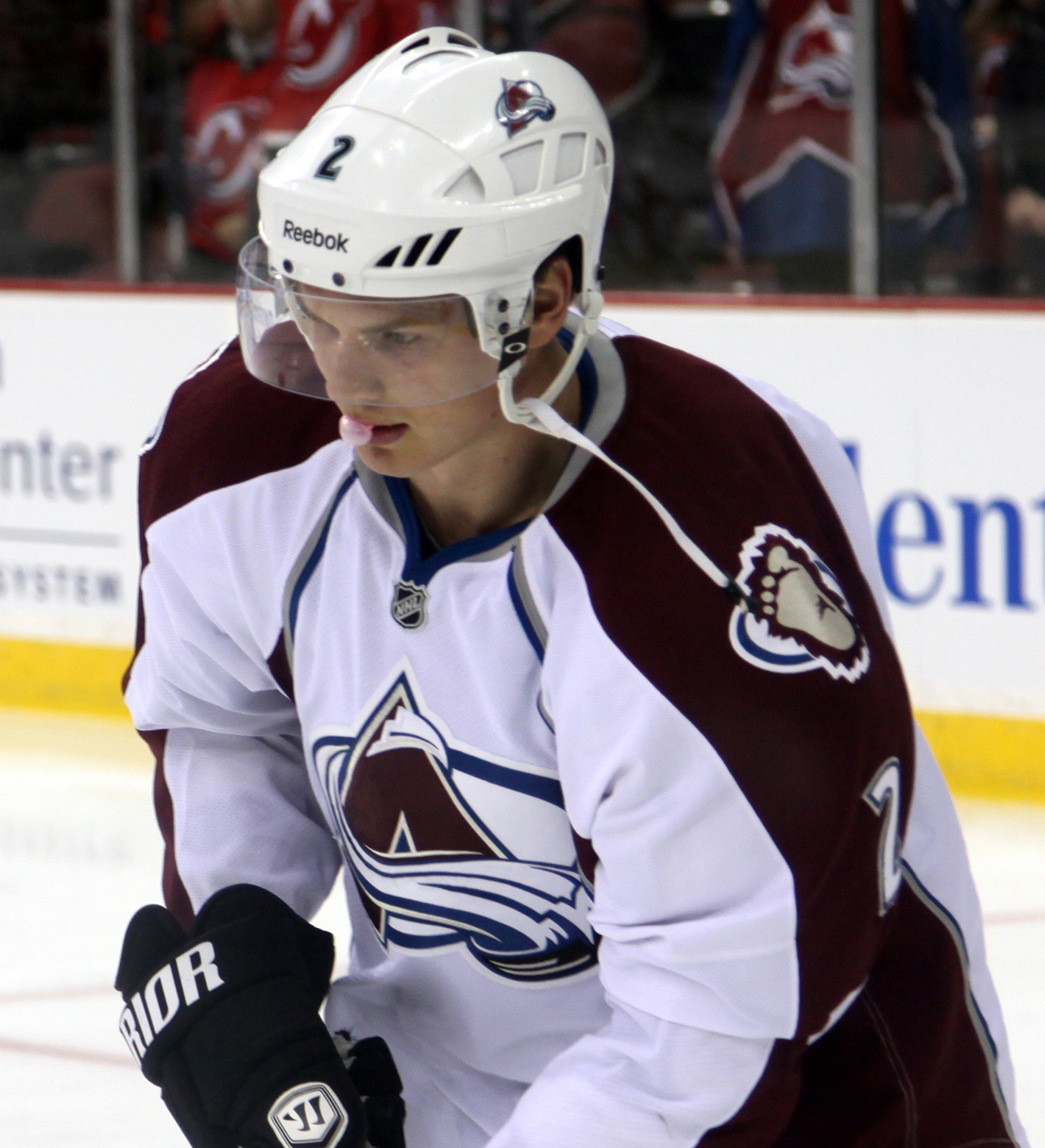
- Holden with the Colorado Avalanche in 2014
- Born: May 15, 1987 (age 39) St. Albert, Alberta, Canada
- Height: 6 ft 4 in (193 cm)
- Weight: 210 lb (95 kg; 15 st 0 lb)
- Position: Defence
- Shot: Left
- Played for: Columbus Blue Jackets; Colorado Avalanche; New York Rangers; Boston Bruins; Vegas Golden Knights; Ottawa Senators
- National team: Canada
- NHL draft: Undrafted
- Playing career: 2008–2023

Nick Holden (born May 15, 1987) is a Canadian former professional ice hockey player who was a defenceman for 12 seasons in the National Hockey League (NHL) for the Columbus Blue Jackets, Colorado Avalanche, New York Rangers, Boston Bruins, Vegas Golden Knights, and Ottawa Senators.

Holden began his hockey career in the St. Albert, Alberta, area, playing alongside Ryan Stanton with the St. Albert Raiders. His play eventually drew attention towards him from the Alberta Junior Hockey League (AJHL), but he never foresaw a future with the sport. By the age of 18, Holden began apprenticeships to work towards the goal of becoming a plumber. Instead, he joined the Chilliwack Bruins of the Western Hockey League (WHL) as an undrafted player and played two seasons with them.

Holden ended his major junior hockey career by signing a three-year entry-level contract with the Columbus Blue Jackets. He played within the organization for seven years before leaving as a free agent for the Colorado Avalanche. While with the Avalanche, Holden became a mainstay on the NHL roster and proved to be an important part of their defence during the 2014 Stanley Cup playoffs. He spent three seasons with the Avalanche before being traded to the New York Rangers in 2016, who in turn, traded him to the Boston Bruins after a year and a half. Holden played 18 games with the Bruins before signing as a free agent with the Vegas Golden Knights, his fifth NHL club. Holden was traded to the Ottawa Senators in July 2021, before retiring in 2023 to join the Golden Knights' player development staff.

== Early life ==
Holden was born on May 15, 1987, in St. Albert, Alberta, to parents Lynda and John Holden. His father John was a former hockey player and his step brother played for the Vancouver Giants. He grew up in Alberta with siblings Tiffany and Jack and attended St. Albert Catholic High School. When he was 12 years old, Holden earned his first job as an ice hockey referee.

== Playing career ==
=== Junior ===
As a youth, Holden played bantam and midget-A ice hockey without trying out for a team. He began playing peewee hockey with his sister Tiffany and only took the game seriously when he reached Midget. He later played Midget AAA hockey for the St. Albert Raiders alongside future NHLer Ryan Stanton. In his final season with the team, he played in 35 games and recorded 22 points, the most by a defenseman, which drew attention from the Alberta Junior Hockey League (AJHL). His play earned him a callup to the Junior A-level Camrose Kodiaks and competed with them in the RBC Cup. During the 2005 AJHL Championship, Holden and the Kodiaks lost 3–2 against the Weyburn Red Wings of the Saskatchewan Junior Hockey League (SJHL).

Holden eventually played Junior A-level hockey for the Kodiaks and Sherwood Park Crusaders in the AJHL, but disliked the attention he received. While playing in the AJHL, Holden has said he was more focused on earning a college scholarship than continuing to play hockey. By the age of 18, Holden secured an apprenticeship in plumbing which he planned on continuing if his hockey career did not pan out. As a result, Holden flew under the radar of most scouts until Chilliwack Bruins General manager Darrell May saw him play for the Kodiaks the night before the 2006 Western Hockey League (WHL) Entry Draft.

He eventually joined the Chilliwack Bruins of the WHL as an undrafted player in 2006 after graduating from St. Albert's. Standing at 6 feet 3 inches (1.91 m) and weighing 200 pounds (91 kg), Holden garnered attention from Allain Roy of CMG Sports, a sports agent company. Holden said this is when he'd first "ever thought about it....I never figured I needed an agent." After his rookie season, Holden earned a scholarship to the University of the Fraser Valley and was invited to the Edmonton Oilers 2007 NHL training camp on an Amateur Tryout. Upon returning for his second season with the Bruins, Holden was named captain of the team while recording 22 goals and 38 assists for a total of 60 points. On March 28, 2008, Holden signed a three-year entry-level contract with the Columbus Blue Jackets, thus concluding his major junior career.

=== Professional ===
==== Columbus Blue Jackets ====
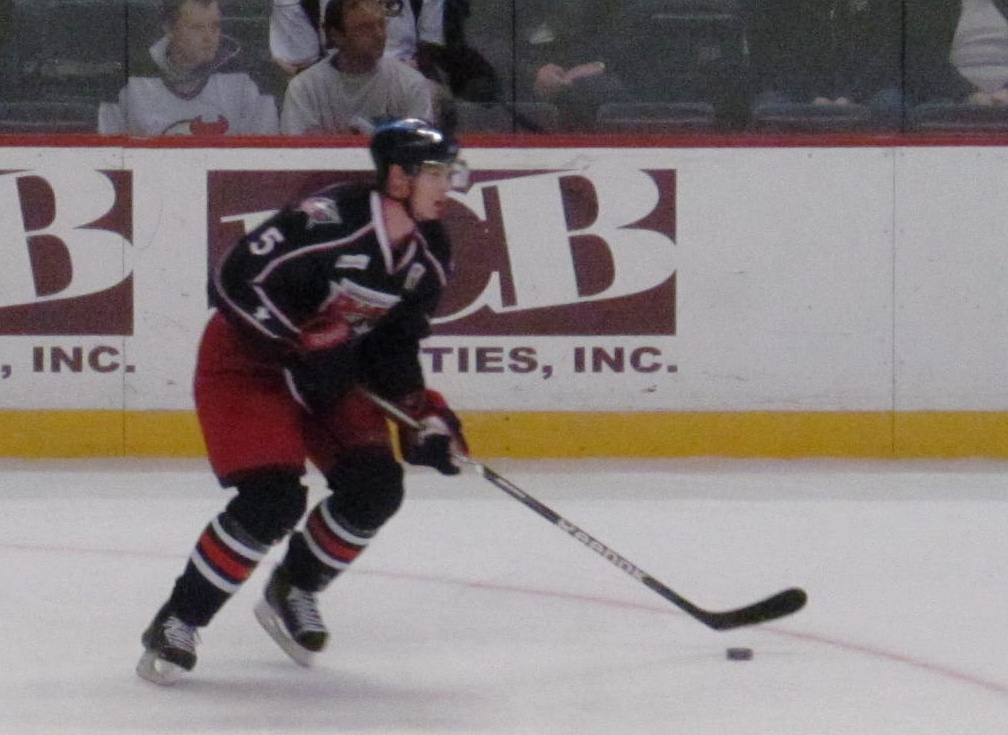
Holden during his tenure with the Springfield Falcons

Upon signing his contract, Holden joined the Columbus Blue Jackets then-American Hockey League (AHL) affiliate, the Syracuse Crunch, for the remainder of the 2007–08 season. He played one game with the team before beginning his first full professional campaign during the 2008–09 season, where he recorded 22 points in 61 games. Holden attended the Blue Jackets training camp prior to the 2009–10 season, but was reassigned to the AHL on September 28, 2009. He spent the entirety of the season with the Crunch and recorded a then-career high 23 points in 68 games.

Following the 2009–10 season, the Blue Jackets switched their AHL affiliate to the Springfield Falcons and Holden began the season with them. After playing in two games for the Falcons, Holden was called up to the NHL as a replacement for the injured Mike Commodore. He made his NHL debut on October 20, 2010, in a 3–1 victory over the Anaheim Ducks and played in five games before being reassigned to the AHL on November 5, 2010. Holden concluded the season with the Falcons and recorded a then-career high 25 points in 67 games. On June 20, 2011, Holden and the Blue Jackets agreed to a one-year, two-way NHL-American Hockey League Contract for the following season.

With a new contract signed, Holden attended the Blue Jackets training camp prior to the 2011–12 season. On October 1, 2011, Holden was placed on waivers by the Blue Jackets for the purpose of assigning him to the AHL and he thus started the 2011–12 season with the Springfield Falcons. Early in the season, Holden suffered an ankle and shoulder injury which cut his campaign to only 25 games. He returned to the Falcons during the lock-out-shortened 2012–13 season, after attending the Jackets training camp. He was named an alternate captain of the Falcons and appeared in a brief, two-game return to the NHL with the Blue Jackets. After recording 4 goals and 18 assists, Holden was called up to the NHL level on February 4, 2013. He finished the season with nine goals and 39 points in 73 games, and was named the Falcons IOA/American Specialty AHL Man of the Year.

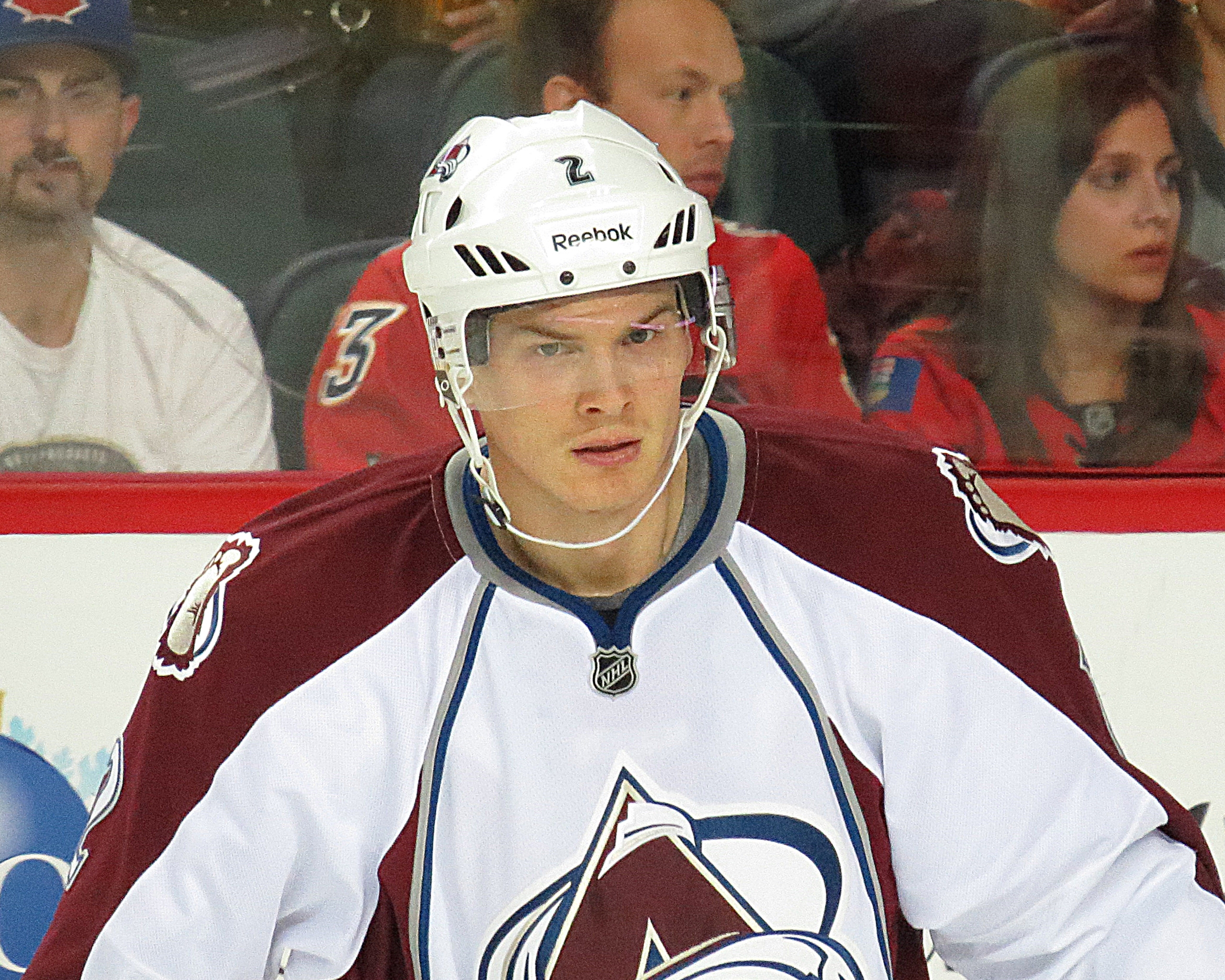
Holden during a game in 2013

==== Colorado Avalanche ====
On July 5, 2013, Holden left the Blue Jackets organization and signed a two-year contract as a free agent with the Colorado Avalanche. After partaking and impressing in his first Avalanche training camp, Holden was unexpectedly successful in making the team's opening night roster for the 2013–14 season. Holden sat as a healthy scratch in the first 11 games of the season before making his Avalanche debut as a forward in a 3–2 overtime victory over the Dallas Stars on November 1, 2013. At the time of his debut, he was the only player on the roster to not play in a regular-season game during the 2013–14 season. In returning to his natural position of defence, Holden scored his first career NHL goal, a game-winner, against Braden Holtby in a 4–1 victory over the Washington Capitals on November 10, 2013. As the season progressed, Holden solidified his position within the Avalanche blueline, and on January 18, in a game against the Nashville Predators, he set a career high in scoring two goals and three points whilst also recording an all-time team record of nine hits for a defenceman. His three points and nine hits were last matched by Jiří Šlégr of the Atlanta Thrashers in 2001. Holden finished the season second amongst Avalanche defencemen with ten goals in only 54 games. He also led all Avalanche defenceman with three goals and four points in their Western Conference Quarter-final series defeat in the 2014 Stanley Cup playoffs against the Minnesota Wild. Executive Vice President of Hockey Operations Joe Sakic spoke highly of Holden's play, saying "He provided offense from our blue line and played with a lot of confidence as the season moved on. We are pleased that he will continue to be a part of our team." Holden was rewarded from his break-out season in signing a three-year contract extension on July 1, 2014.

Holden began the 2014–15 season with the Avalanche and played in his 100th career NHL game. Numerously throughout the season, Holden was called upon to serve at the Avalanche's fourth line forward with teammates Marc-André Cliche and winger Cody McLeod. He also sat as a healthy scratch during the 2014–15 campaign, including four consecutive games in December. In spite of this, Holden remained a mainstay in the Avalanche's lineup and once again made their opening night roster.

==== New York Rangers and Boston Bruins ====
On June 25, 2016, with two years remaining on his contract, Holden was traded by the Avalanche at the 2016 NHL Entry Draft to the New York Rangers in exchange for a 4th-round pick in 2017. In the 2016–17 season, Holden enjoyed a successful year with the Rangers in establishing new career highs with 11 goals and 34 points in 80 games. He often played on the right side for the Rangers due to their depleted defense, and spent time on both the second and first top pairings with Marc Staal and Ryan McDonagh. He played in nearly all games for the Rangers in the postseason, only sitting as a healthy scratch during Game 3 against Montreal. Fellow defenseman Brady Skjei spoke highly of Holden as a teammate, saying "He’s a steady player and has a good shot from the point, obviously.... He makes the simple play, he’s strong, big, skates well....He’s a nice guy, not a rah-rah guy in the room, but everyone respects him." In spite of this, his future with the Rangers was tenuous and coach Alain Vigneault acknowledged Holden was not guaranteed a spot on the roster in the 2017–18 season. Accurately so, Holden played only 55 games for the Rangers while in the final year of his contract before being traded to the Boston Bruins in exchange for Rob O'Gara and a 2018 third-round draft pick. Holden, who was familiar with Massachusetts having played for the Springfield Falcons, left his wife and children in New York as he joined the team in Toronto. He appeared in 18 games with the Bruins to close out the season with one goal and five points. In the post-season, Holden was relegated to a healthy scratch throughout the run, appearing in just two games.

==== Vegas Golden Knights ====
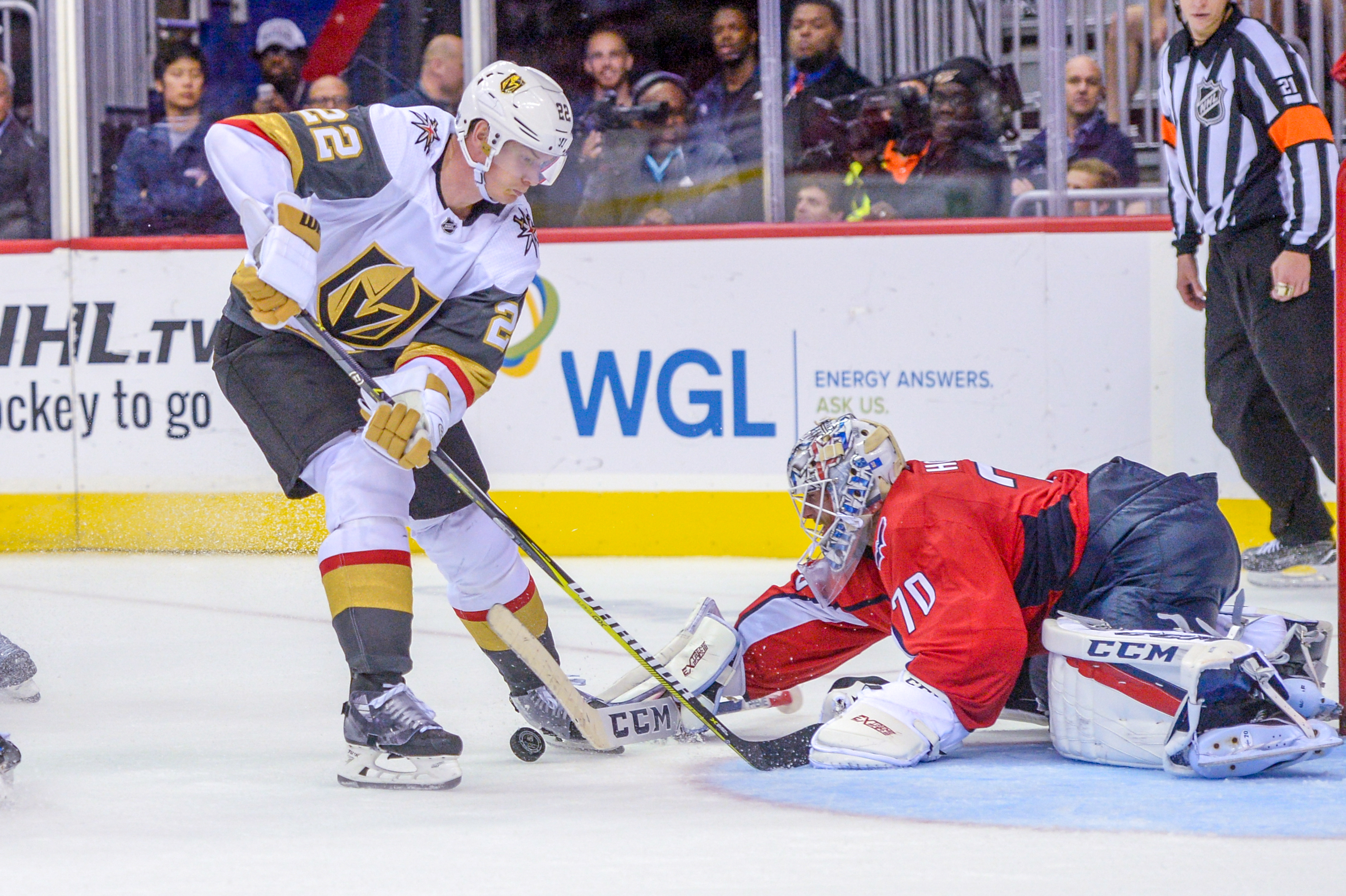
Holden making a play on the puck in front of Braden Holtby of the Washington Capitals in 2018.

With the Bruins unwilling to extend his contract, Holden left to sign with his fifth NHL club, the Vegas Golden Knights, on a two-year, $4.4 million contract on July 1, 2018. In his first season with the Golden Knights, Holden was often paired with Shea Theodore or Zach Whitecloud on the blueline. On February 28, 2020, Holden assisted on a goal with Nicolas Roy and Nick Cousins, making them the first trio of "Nicks" to combine on a goal. At the 2020 NHL Trade Deadline, Vegas rewarded Holden's play with a two-year, $3.4 million contract extension; preventing him from becoming an unrestricted free agent at the end of the 2019–20 season.

==== Ottawa Senators ====
On July 28, 2021, Holden was traded to the Ottawa Senators alongside a 2022 3rd-round pick in exchange for Evgenii Dadonov. He played in 30 games with the Senators, registering one goal and four points. On January 27, 2022, the Senators signed Holden to a one-year, $1.3 million contract extension. In his second season with the club, he played in 65 games, scoring two goals and sixteen points. At the end of the season he was informed that he would not be re-signed by the Senators.

=== Retirement ===
On September 12, 2023, the Vegas Golden Knights announced that Holden had joined their player development staff, retiring from play in the process.

== Personal life ==
Holden and his wife Angela have four children together and are devout Christians. He participates in a chapter of Fellowship of Christian Athletes alongside former teammate Ryan Carpenter. On September 7, 2011, Holden was inducted into the St. Albert Skating Wall of Fame.

During the 2016 Fort McMurray wildfire, Holden worked with Sport Central, a sports charity, to donate hockey equipment to children of Fort McMurray who lost theirs. He also purchased and donated tickets for military organizations during the Avalanche's 2015 Military Appreciation Night.

== Career statistics ==
=== Regular season and playoffs ===
			Regular season					Playoffs
Season	Team	League	GP	G	A	Pts	PIM	GP	G	A	Pts	PIM
2003–04	St. Albert Steel 18U AA	REMHL	34	9	15	24	70	—	—	—	—	—
2003–04	St. Albert Raiders AAA	AMHL	2	0	0	0	0	—	—	—	—	—
2004–05	St. Albert Raiders AAA	AMHL	35	7	15	22	24	—	—	—	—	—
2004–05	Camrose Kodiaks	AJHL	4	0	0	0	0	—	—	—	—	—
2005–06	Camrose Kodiaks	AJHL	29	5	8	13	27	—	—	—	—	—
2005–06	Sherwood Park Crusaders	AJHL	28	2	15	17	19	—	—	—	—	—
2006–07	Chilliwack Bruins	WHL	67	8	23	31	62	5	1	1	2	6
2007–08	Chilliwack Bruins	WHL	70	22	38	60	54	4	1	3	4	0
2007–08	Syracuse Crunch	AHL	1	0	0	0	2	—	—	—	—	—
2008–09	Syracuse Crunch	AHL	61	4	18	22	46	—	—	—	—	—
2009–10	Syracuse Crunch	AHL	68	6	17	23	52	—	—	—	—	—
2010–11	Springfield Falcons	AHL	67	4	21	25	63	—	—	—	—	—
2010–11	Columbus Blue Jackets	NHL	5	0	0	0	0	—	—	—	—	—
2011–12	Springfield Falcons	AHL	25	3	6	9	14	—	—	—	—	—
2012–13	Springfield Falcons	AHL	73	9	30	39	58	8	0	3	3	6
2012–13	Columbus Blue Jackets	NHL	2	0	0	0	0	—	—	—	—	—
2013–14	Colorado Avalanche	NHL	54	10	15	25	22	7	3	1	4	8
2014–15	Colorado Avalanche	NHL	78	5	9	14	28	—	—	—	—	—
2015–16	Colorado Avalanche	NHL	82	6	16	22	24	—	—	—	—	—
2016–17	New York Rangers	NHL	80	11	23	34	35	11	2	2	4	4
2017–18	New York Rangers	NHL	55	3	9	12	14	—	—	—	—	—
2017–18	Boston Bruins	NHL	18	1	4	5	0	2	0	1	1	0
2018–19	Vegas Golden Knights	NHL	61	3	12	15	14	1	0	0	0	2
2019–20	Vegas Golden Knights	NHL	61	6	8	14	13	19	0	1	1	4
2020–21	Vegas Golden Knights	NHL	17	0	2	2	2	15	2	5	7	0
2021–22	Ottawa Senators	NHL	76	5	14	19	12	—	—	—	—	—
2022–23	Ottawa Senators	NHL	65	2	14	16	10	—	—	—	—	—
NHL totals			654	52	126	178	174	55	7	10	17	18

Medal record

Representing Canada

Ice hockey

World Championship
Silver medal – second place	2022 Finland	

=== International ===
Year	Team	Event	Result	GP	G	A	Pts	PIM
2022	Canada	WC	2nd place, silver medalist(s)	10	0	2	2	4
Senior totals				10	0	2	2	4

== Awards and honours ==
Award	Year	Ref
AHL
Falcons IOA/American Specialty AHL Man of the Year	2013	
