= Zach Hamill =

Canadian ice hockey player (born 1988)

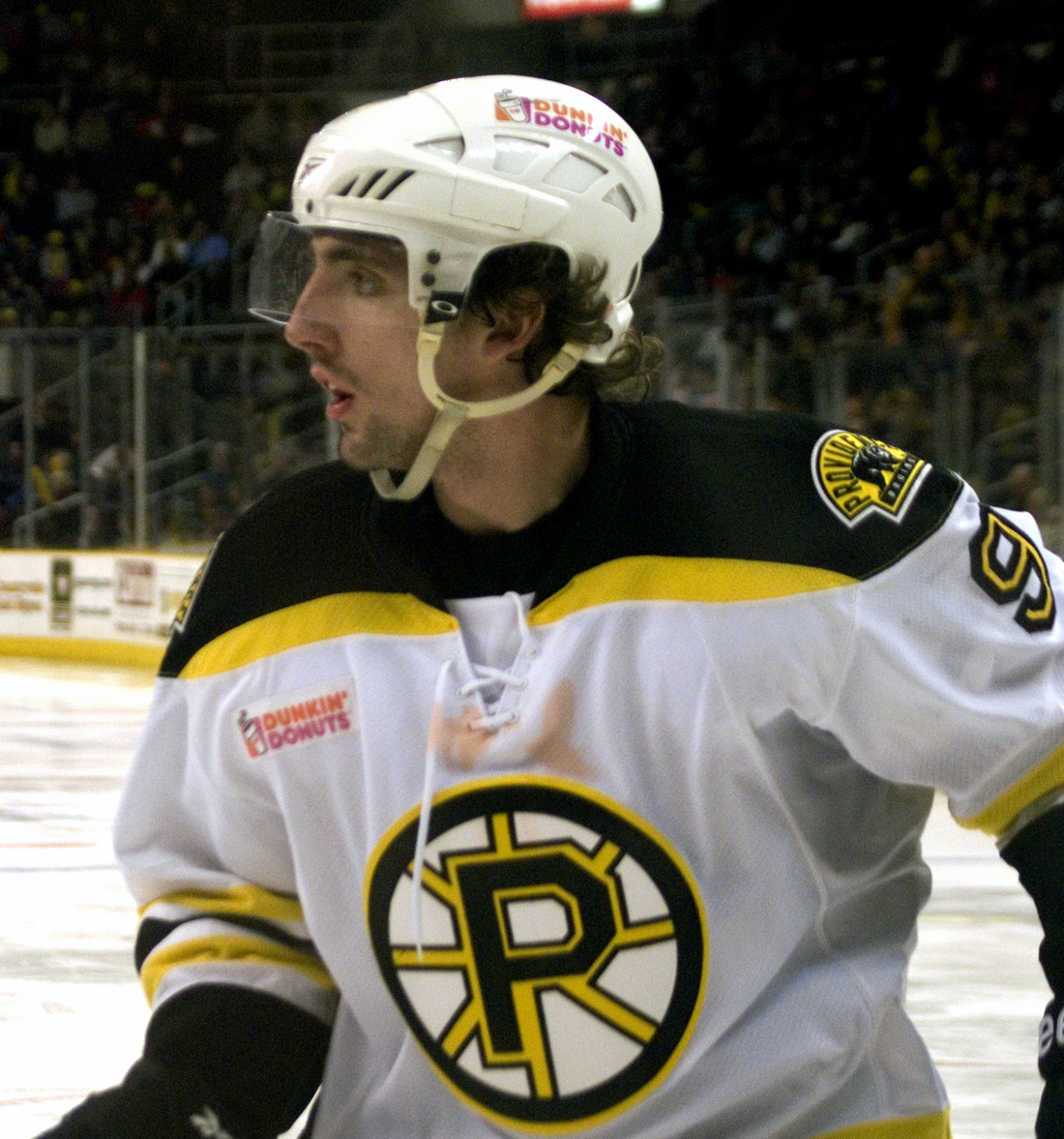
- Hamill with the Providence Bruins in 2011
- Born: September 23, 1988 (age 37) Port Coquitlam, British Columbia, Canada
- Height: 5 ft 11 in (180 cm)
- Weight: 181 lb (82 kg; 12 st 13 lb)
- Position: Centre
- Shot: Right
- Played for: Boston Bruins; Barys Astana; HPK; HC Fribourg-Gottéron; HC Ambrì-Piotta; Iserlohn Roosters; IF Björklöven; Lørenskog IK; HC Dukla Jihlava; EC Bad Nauheim; Ducs d'Angers
- NHL draft: 8th overall, 2007; Boston Bruins
- Playing career: 2008–2021

Zachary Robert Hamill (born September 23, 1988) is a Canadian former professional ice hockey centre. Hamill was drafted in the first round, eighth overall by the National Hockey League (NHL)'s Boston Bruins in the 2007 NHL entry draft. Prior to turning professional, Hamill spent his entire Western Hockey League (WHL) career with the Everett Silvertips.

== Playing career ==
=== Junior ===
Hamill was drafted in the first round, third overall, by the Everett Silvertips in the 2003 WHL Bantam Draft. Shortly after on October 8, 2003, he made his Western Hockey League (WHL) debut against the Seattle Thunderbirds. Although playing in only four regular season games in the early part of the 2003–04 season, Hamill finished with two assists before being reassigned to the Port Coquitlam Buckaroos of the Pacific International Junior Hockey League (PIJHL). He returned to the Silvertips for their 2004 WHL playoff run, playing in 20 games. The 2004–05 season was Hamill's first full WHL season, playing in 57 games. He finished his rookie season with a respectable 33 points. This season also saw Hamill represent Canada Pacific at the 2005 World U-17 Hockey Challenge in Lethbridge, Alberta. During the off-season, Hamill represented Canada at the 2005 U-18 Junior World Cup in Břeclav, Czech Republic, and Piešťany, Slovakia.

In his sophomore season, Hamill continued to better his play. In December, he represented Team WHL in the 2005 ADT Canada–Russia Challenge. Hamill finished the year with 59 points in 53 games, an average of over a point per game. Hamill's play was rewarded when on June 22, 2006, he was invited to Canada's National Junior Team Development Camp.

Hamill's 2006–07 season was arguably his best. In November, Hamill once again represented Team WHL in the 2006 ADT Canada-Russia Challenge and in January, he played in the 2007 CHL Top Prospects Game. Hamill was named the WHL's player of the week for the week of January 22–28, scoring 13 points in 4 games. Hamill was also named the player of the month for January after collecting 24 points in 12 games. With 93 points at the end of the season, Hamill won the Bob Clarke Trophy as the WHL's leading scorer and was named to the WHL West First All-Star Team. With his 61 assists and 93 points, Hamill claimed both the Silvertips' single season assists and points records. Hamill also finished the season with seven Silvertips franchise career records.

=== Professional ===
On August 8, 2007, shortly over a month after being drafted by the Boston Bruins, Hamill signed his first professional contract with the organization. After attending the Bruins' training camp in 2007 and playing in one pre-season game, Hamill was returned to the Silvertips for the 2007–08 WHL season.

At the completion of the Silvertips season, Hamill joined the Providence Bruins, the Boston Bruins' American Hockey League (AHL) affiliate. During a recall stint with the Bruins in the 2009–10 season, Hamill was credited with his first NHL point on April 11, 2010, with an assist against the Washington Capitals.

During the 2010–11 season, Hamill played in three games for the Boston Bruins, earning an assist against the Montreal Canadiens on February 9, 2011. He was recalled to Boston during the 2011 Stanley Cup playoffs, where the Bruins won the Stanley Cup. Although he did not qualify to have his name engraved on the Stanley Cup, he received a Stanley Cup ring.

On February 6, 2012, the Boston Bruins placed Hamill on waivers; after he cleared waivers on February 7, he was sent down to the Providence Bruins. On May 26, 2012, he was traded to the Washington Capitals in exchange for forward Chris Bourque. With the 2012–13 NHL lockout in effect, Hamill was directly assigned to the Capitals' AHL affiliate, the Hershey Bears. In the 2012–13 season, he tallied 22 points in 40 games with the Bears before he was traded to the Florida Panthers in exchange for forward Casey Wellman on January 31, 2013. He remained in the AHL with the San Antonio Rampage and contributed with 18 points in 26 games. On April 11, 2013, he was reassigned on loan by the Panthers to the Milwaukee Admirals.

In July 2013, Hamill signed a two-way contract with the Vancouver Canucks. He failed to make the team out of training camp and was assigned to the team's AHL affiliate, the Utica Comets. Hamill had difficulty being productive in Utica, contributing 9 points in 21 games. In December 2013, Hamill was put on unconditional waivers by the Canucks after they and Hamill mutually agreed to terminate his contract. On December 24, 2013, Hamill signed a one-year contract with Barys Astana of the Kontinental Hockey League (KHL). In 13 games, Hamill recorded one goal and two assists. He was not re-signed at the end of the season.

On August 29, 2014, Finnish Liiga club HPK announced they had signed Hamill to a one-year contract.

On September 4, 2015, Hamill signed an initial two-week contract with HC Fribourg-Gottéron of the Swiss National League A. In the 2015–16 season, Hamill immediately impressed in Fribourg, earning another two-week extension, collecting five goals in his nine-game stint. On October 9, 2015, he was released by Fribourg as he was signed as a temporary injury cover for one-month to play with rivals HC Ambrì-Piotta. He was subsequently signed for the remainder of the season in Ambrì on November 3. He featured in eight games with Ambrì before he was mutually released from his contract to play out the remainder of the season in Germany with the Iserlohn Roosters of the Deutsche Eishockey Liga (DEL).

As a free agent over the following summer and mid-way into the 2016–17 season, Hamill belatedly signed a one-year contract in the Swedish Allsvenskan, agreeing to terms with IF Björklöven on November 21, 2016.

== Personal life ==
Hamill was born on September 23, 1988, in Port Coquitlam, British Columbia, to Scott and Lonnie Hamill. He has two siblings, Carson and Paisley. His brother, Carson, played junior hockey for the Langley Hornets of the British Columbia Hockey League (BCHL) and currently plays at Lindenwood University in St. Charles, Missouri. He attended Riverside Secondary School in Port Coquitlam.

== Records ==
- Everett Silvertips' franchise record for points in a season (93)
- Everett Silvertips' franchise record for assists in a season (61)
- Everett Silvertips' had held franchise record for career games played (250); Shane Harper is the current record holder
- Everett Silvertips' franchise record for career points (262)
- Everett Silvertips' had held franchise record for career goals (87); Shane Harper is the current record holder
- Everett Silvertips' franchise record for career assists (175)
- Everett Silvertips' franchise record for career playoff games played (62)
- Everett Silvertips' franchise record for career playoff points (37)
- Everett Silvertips' franchise record for career playoff assists (27)

== Career statistics ==
=== Regular season and playoffs ===
			Regular season					Playoffs
Season	Team	League	GP	G	A	Pts	PIM	GP	G	A	Pts	PIM
2003–04	Port Coquitlam Buckaroos	PJHL	39	30	31	61	50	—	—	—	—	—
2003–04	Everett Silvertips	WHL	4	0	2	2	0	20	3	2	5	2
2004–05	Everett Silvertips	WHL	57	8	25	33	29	11	2	3	5	8
2005–06	Everett Silvertips	WHL	53	21	38	59	28	15	3	11	14	4
2006–07	Everett Silvertips	WHL	69	32	61	93	90	12	2	8	10	16
2007–08	Everett Silvertips	WHL	67	26	49	75	88	4	0	3	3	2
2007–08	Providence Bruins	AHL	7	0	5	5	6	9	1	3	4	0
2008–09	Providence Bruins	AHL	65	13	13	26	40	16	1	5	6	4
2009–10	Providence Bruins	AHL	75	14	30	44	24	—	—	—	—	—
2009–10	Boston Bruins	NHL	1	0	1	1	0	—	—	—	—	—
2010–11	Providence Bruins	AHL	68	9	34	43	66	—	—	—	—	—
2010–11	Boston Bruins	NHL	3	0	1	1	0	—	—	—	—	—
2011–12	Providence Bruins	AHL	41	8	13	21	24	—	—	—	—	—
2011–12	Boston Bruins	NHL	16	0	2	2	4	—	—	—	—	—
2012–13	Hershey Bears	AHL	40	11	11	22	34	—	—	—	—	—
2012–13	San Antonio Rampage	AHL	26	5	13	18	20	—	—	—	—	—
2012–13	Milwaukee Admirals	AHL	6	3	1	4	0	4	1	1	2	2
2013–14	Utica Comets	AHL	22	3	6	9	6	—	—	—	—	—
2013–14	Barys Astana	KHL	13	1	2	3	10	1	0	0	0	0
2014–15	HPK	Liiga	58	16	19	35	67	—	—	—	—	—
2015–16	HC Fribourg–Gottéron	NLA	9	5	2	7	6	—	—	—	—	—
2015–16	HC Ambrì–Piotta	NLA	8	1	3	4	6	—	—	—	—	—
2015–16	Iserlohn Roosters	DEL	24	4	7	11	14	—	—	—	—	—
2016–17	IF Björklöven	Allsv	29	7	11	18	16	—	—	—	—	—
2017–18	Lørenskog IK	GET	27	11	8	19	22	—	—	—	—	—
2017–18	HC Dukla Jihlava	ELH	21	4	5	9	10	—	—	—	—	—
2018–19	EC Bad Nauheim	DEL2	34	10	29	39	63	4	1	1	2	4
2019–20	EC Bad Nauheim	DEL2	32	13	18	31	38	2	2	0	2	8
2020–21	Ducs d'Angers	FRA	22	5	8	13	30	—	—	—	—	—
AHL totals			349	66	126	192	220	29	3	9	12	6
NHL totals			20	0	4	4	4	—	—	—	—	—

Medal record

Representing Canada

ice hockey

World U-17 Hockey Challenge
Silver medal – second place	2005 Lethbridge	

U-18 Junior World Cup
Gold medal – first place	2005 Piešťany	

=== International ===
Year	Team	Event	GP	G	A	Pts	PIM
2005	Canada Pacific	U17	6	2	3	5	10
2005	Canada	U18	5	5	3	8	4
Junior totals			11	7	6	13	14

== Awards and honors ==
Award	Year
WHL
West First All-Star Team	2007
Bob Clarke Trophy	2007
CHL First All-Star Team	2007

== Transactions ==
- June 22, 2007 – Drafted in the first round, eighth overall by the Boston Bruins in the 2007 NHL entry draft;
- May 26, 2012 – Traded to the Washington Capitals for Chris Bourque;
- January 31, 2013 – Traded to the Florida Panthers for Casey Wellman;
- July 25, 2013 – Signed as a free agent by the Vancouver Canucks;
- December 24, 2013 – Signed as a free agent by the Barys Astana (KHL);
- August 29, 2014 – Signed as a free agent by HPK (Liiga).

Awards and achievements
Preceded by Troy Brouwer	Winner of the WHL Bob Clarke Trophy; 2007	Succeeded by Mark Santorelli
Preceded by Phil Kessel	Boston Bruins first-round draft pick 2007	Succeeded by Joe Colborne
