= Chilliwack Coliseum =

Arena in Chilliwack, British Columbia, Canada

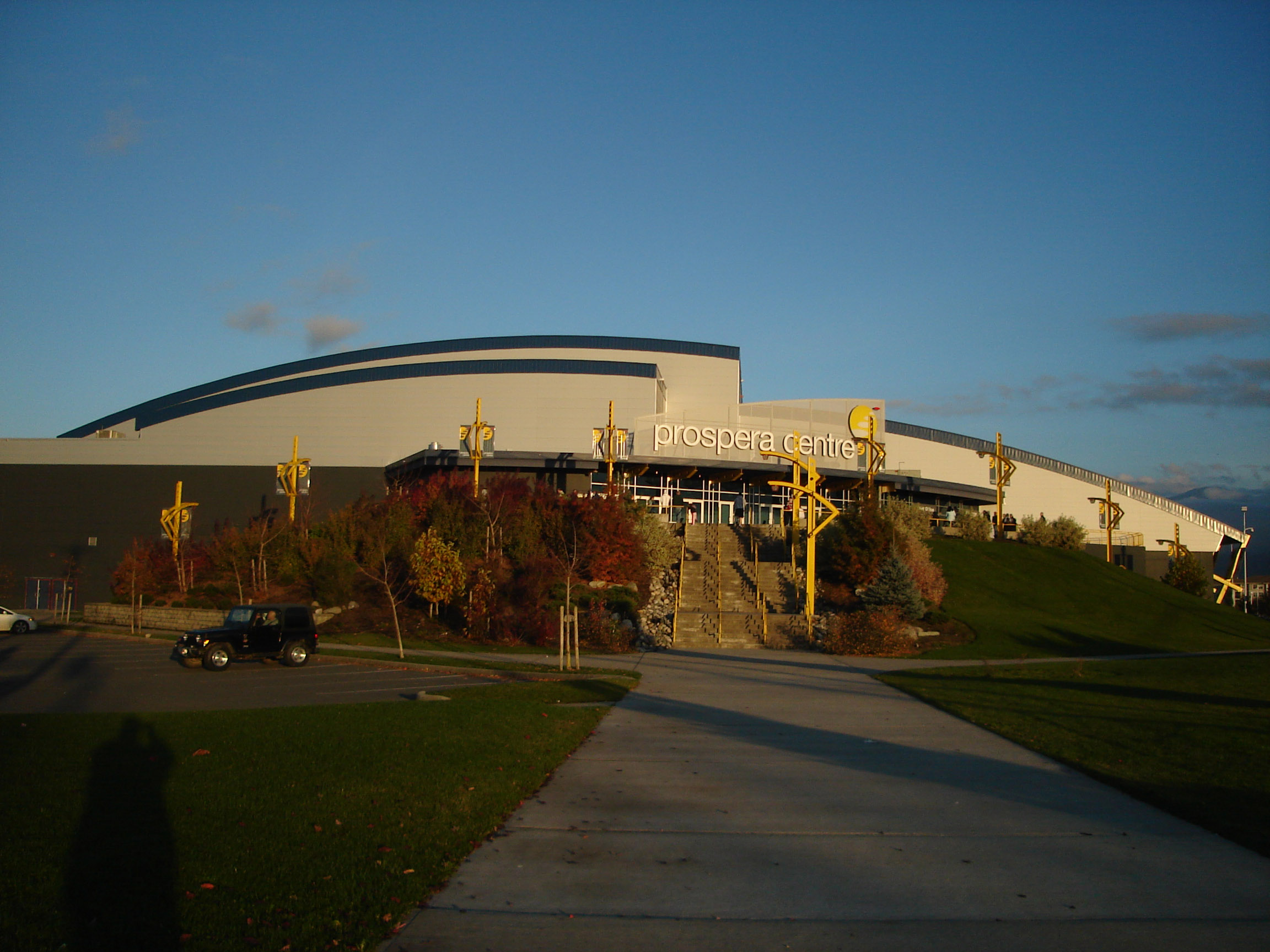
- Interactive map of Chilliwack Coliseum
- Former names: Prospera Centre (2004–2019)
- Location: 45323 Hodgins Avenue; Chilliwack, British Columbia; V2P 8G1
- Coordinates: 49.169748°N 121.969277°W
- Owner: City of Chilliwack (as of May 1, 2025) Chiefs Development Group Ltd.
- Capacity: 5,000 (ice hockey); 6,000 (concerts)
- Executive suites: 13

Construction
- Opened: September 2004
- Cost: $20.3 million CDN (2004)
- Architect: MQN Architects

Tenants
- Chilliwack Sports Hall of Fame (2013-present); Chilliwack Chiefs (BCHL) (2011–present); Chilliwack Bruins (WHL) (2006–2011); Chilliwack Chiefs (BCHL) (2004–2006)

Website
- https://www.chilliwack.com/main/page.cfm?id=372

Chilliwack Coliseum is a 5,000-seat multi-purpose arena in Chilliwack, British Columbia, Canada. The venue is the home of the Chilliwack Chiefs of the British Columbia Hockey League and has hosted events such as the Junior A ice hockey championship tournament in 2018, concerts, and trade shows.

The venue opened in 2004 after the Chiefs Development Group and the City of Chilliwack entered into a public-private partnership in 2002 for the financing, design, building and operation of the facility. The facility was originally called the Prospera Centre, pursuant to a sponsorship agreement with the Prospera Credit Union. It was renamed the Chilliwack Coliseum in 2019, pursuant to a five-year agreement with the City of Chilliwack.

In October 2024, the venue hosted the 2024 BCHL showcase with the Abbotsford Centre.

The venue was previously owned by the Chilliwack Chiefs' parent company, the Chiefs Development Group. On May 1, 2025, ownership of the venue reverted to the City of Chilliwack. Chiefs Development Group was to continue managing operations of the facility until May 1, 2026, while the city worked on a transition plan between CDG and the tenants.

The arena was the home of the Chilliwack Bruins of the Western Hockey League from 2006 until their relocation to Victoria in 2011 where they became the Victoria Royals.
