= Mark Santorelli =

Canadian ice hockey player

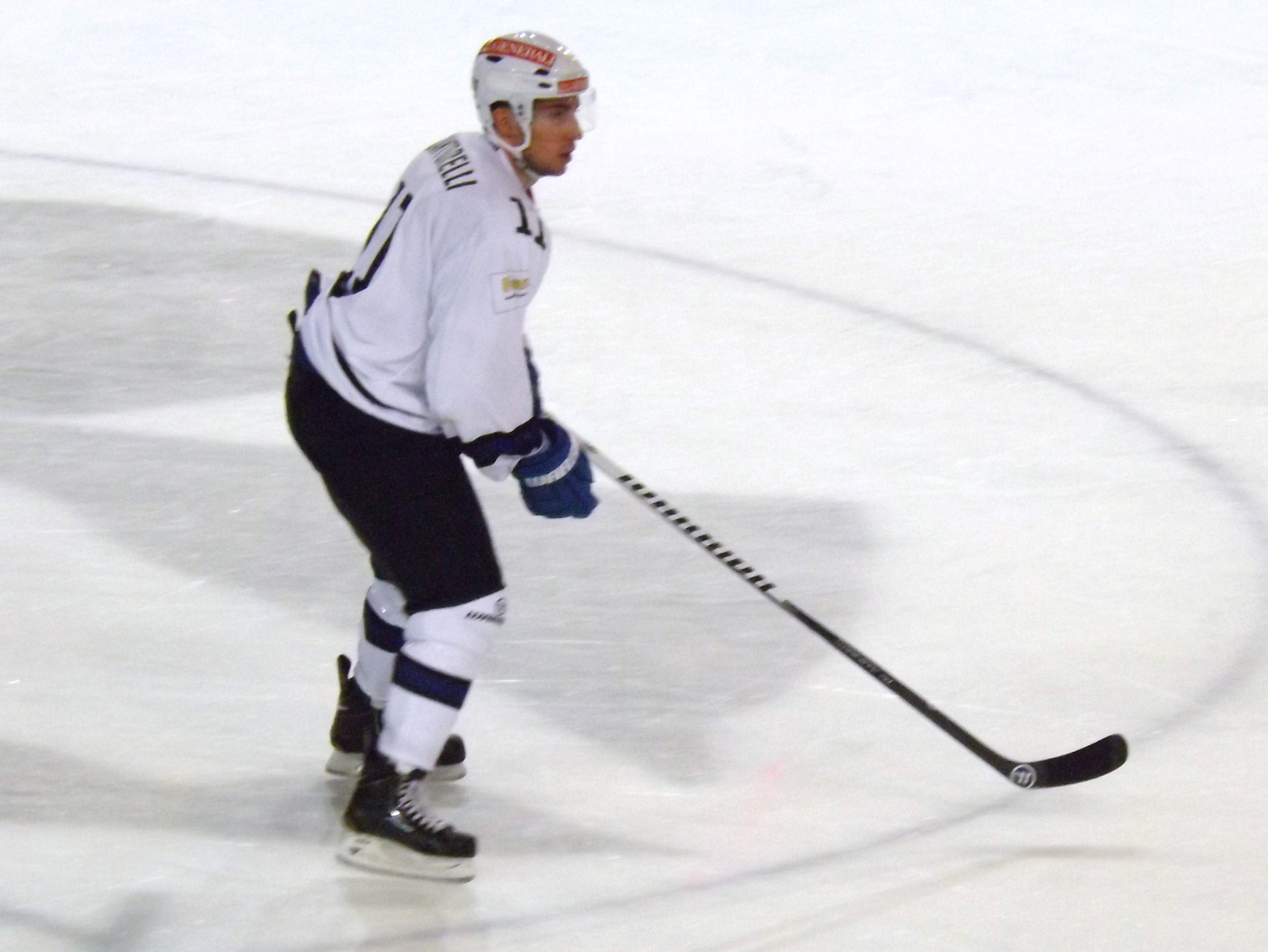
- Born: August 6, 1988 (age 37) Burnaby, British Columbia, Canada
- Height: 6 ft 1 in (185 cm)
- Weight: 185 lb (84 kg; 13 st 3 lb)
- Position: Left wing
- Shot: Right
- Played for: Milwaukee Admirals; Tingsryds AIF; Västerås HK; HC Bolzano; EC VSV
- NHL draft: 119th overall, 2007; Nashville Predators
- Playing career: 2008–2016

Mark Santorelli (born August 6, 1988) is a Canadian former professional ice hockey left winger. His older brother Mike used to play for the Anaheim Ducks. They were teammates through the majority of the 2009–10 season with the Predators AHL affiliate, the Milwaukee Admirals.

== Playing career ==
Santorelli was selected by the Nashville Predators in the fourth round, 119th overall in the 2007 NHL entry draft. In the 2006–07 WHL season, he led the Chilliwack Bruins of the Western Hockey League (WHL) in points with 82. Then, in the 2007–08 WHL season, he won the prestigious Bob Clarke Trophy as the league's top scorer with 101 points. Santorelli is the Chilliwack Bruins franchise leader in career assists, points, and games played.

On August 5, 2013, Santorelli moved to Italy from Sweden, signing a one-year contract with HCB South Tyrol, the newest accepted member of the Austrian Hockey League. In a surprising 2013–14 season, Santorelli was instrumental in helping Bolzano claim the EBEL Championship, posting 45 points in 54 games to become part of the first non-Austrian club to win the Austrian title.

On July 12, 2014, Santorelli left Bolzano for EBEL competitor, EC VSV on a one-year deal.

== Career statistics ==
| | | | Regular season | | | | | Playoffs |
| Season | Team | League | GP | G | A | Pts | PIM | GP | G | A | Pts | PIM |
|---|---|---|---|---|---|---|---|---|---|---|---|---|
| 2003–04 | Abbotsford Pilots | PIJHL | 40 | 12 | 19 | 31 | 33 | — | — | — | — | — |
| 2003–04 | Chilliwack Chiefs | BCHL | 1 | 0 | 1 | 1 | 0 | — | — | — | — | — |
| 2004–05 | Salmon Arm Silverbacks | BCHL | 59 | 9 | 16 | 25 | 10 | 11 | 2 | 3 | 5 | 6 |
| 2005–06 | Salmon Arm Silverbacks | BCHL | 20 | 2 | 10 | 12 | 11 | — | — | — | — | — |
| 2005–06 | Burnaby Express | BCHL | 39 | 15 | 28 | 43 | 16 | 20 | 2 | 14 | 16 | 14 |
| 2006–07 | Chilliwack Bruins | WHL | 72 | 29 | 53 | 82 | 46 | 5 | 2 | 3 | 5 | 2 |
| 2007–08 | Chilliwack Bruins | WHL | 72 | 27 | 74 | 101 | 32 | 4 | 1 | 4 | 5 | 4 |
| 2007–08 | Milwaukee Admirals | AHL | 1 | 0 | 0 | 0 | 0 | 2 | 0 | 0 | 0 | 0 |
| 2008–09 | Milwaukee Admirals | AHL | 53 | 1 | 6 | 7 | 8 | — | — | — | — | — |
| 2008–09 | Cincinnati Cyclones | ECHL | 6 | 1 | 2 | 3 | 0 | 15 | 1 | 6 | 7 | 0 |
| 2009–10 | Milwaukee Admirals | AHL | 68 | 11 | 13 | 24 | 6 | 6 | 1 | 2 | 3 | 0 |
| 2010–11 | Milwaukee Admirals | AHL | 64 | 8 | 13 | 21 | 26 | 8 | 0 | 2 | 2 | 0 |
| 2011–12 | Tingsryds AIF | Allsv | 48 | 11 | 24 | 35 | 18 | — | — | — | — | — |
| 2012–13 | Tingsryds AIF | Allsv | 38 | 5 | 10 | 15 | 22 | — | — | — | — | — |
| 2012–13 | Västerås HK | Allsv | 14 | 2 | 4 | 6 | 6 | 10 | 0 | 5 | 5 | 4 |
| 2013–14 | HC Bolzano | EBEL | 54 | 14 | 31 | 45 | 12 | 13 | 4 | 8 | 12 | 4 |
| 2014–15 | EC VSV | EBEL | 40 | 8 | 24 | 32 | 16 | 4 | 2 | 2 | 4 | 2 |
| 2015–16 | EC VSV | EBEL | 41 | 9 | 14 | 23 | 12 | 9 | 0 | 5 | 5 | 0 |
| AHL totals | | | 186 | 20 | 32 | 52 | 40 | 16 | 1 | 4 | 5 | 0 |

== Awards and honours ==
| Award | Year |
|---|---|
WHL
| West Second All-Star Team | 2008 |
| Bob Clarke Trophy | 2008 |

Awards
| Preceded by Zach Hamill | Bob Clarke Trophy; 2008 | Succeeded by Casey Pierro-Zabotel |
