= Mike Santorelli =

Canadian ice hockey player (born 1985)

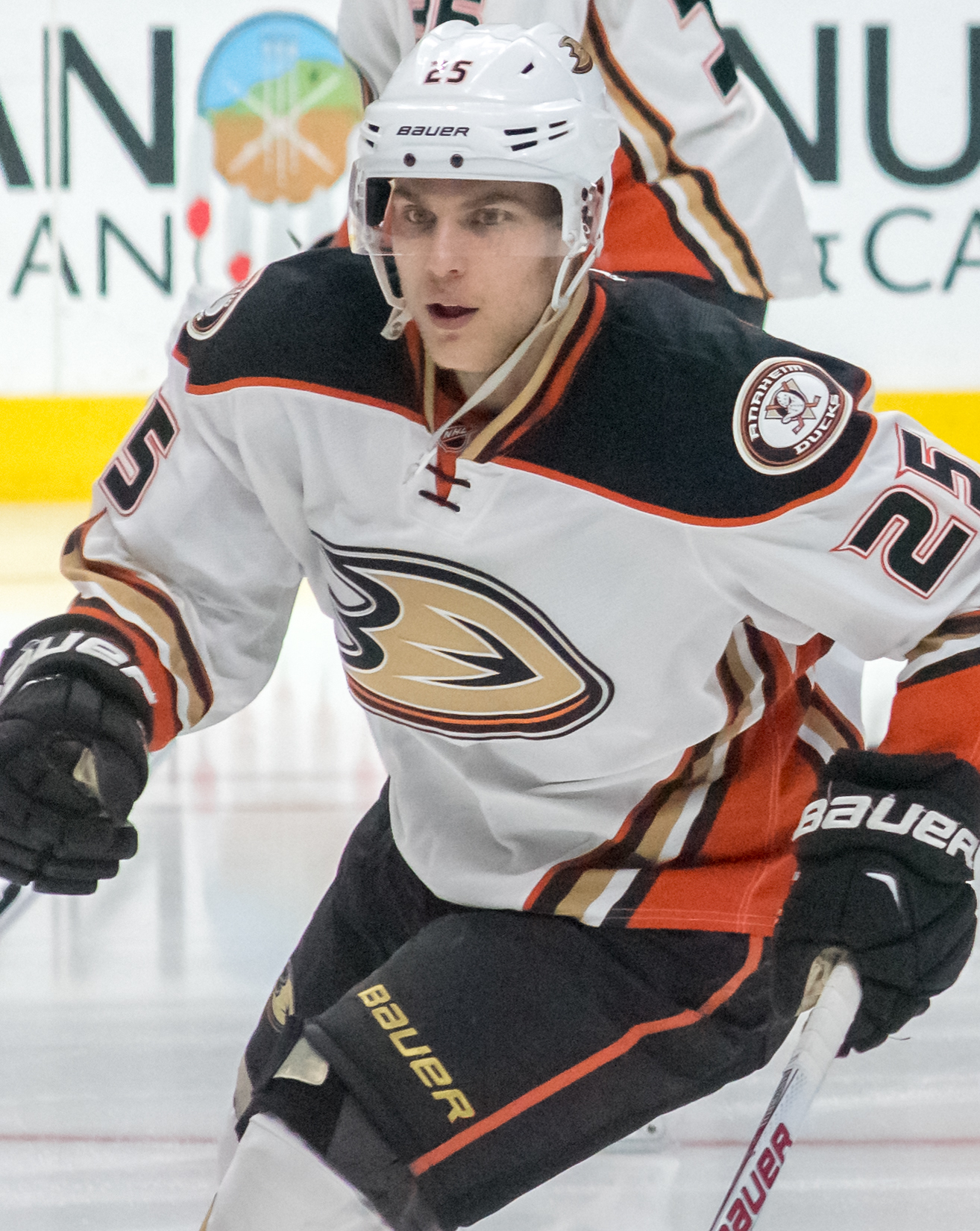
- Santorelli playing for the Anaheim Ducks in 2016
- Born: December 14, 1985 (age 40) Vancouver, British Columbia, Canada
- Height: 6 ft 0 in (183 cm)
- Weight: 190 lb (86 kg; 13 st 8 lb)
- Position: Centre
- Shot: Right
- Played for: Nashville Predators; Florida Panthers; Winnipeg Jets; Vancouver Canucks; Toronto Maple Leafs; Anaheim Ducks; Genève-Servette HC
- NHL draft: 178th overall, 2004; Nashville Predators
- Playing career: 2007–2016

Michael Santorelli (born December 14, 1985) is a Canadian former professional ice hockey player. He played with Genève-Servette HC of the National League A and in the National Hockey League with the Nashville Predators, Florida Panthers, Winnipeg Jets, Vancouver Canucks, Toronto Maple Leafs, and Anaheim Ducks.

Santorelli was drafted by Predators in the sixth round, 178th overall, in the 2004 NHL entry draft. He began his professional career with Nashville's American Hockey League (AHL) affiliate, the Milwaukee Admirals. An AHL All-Star in 2009, Santorelli tied a Skills Competition record by going four for four in the accuracy competition. After two seasons of splitting time between Nashville and Milwaukee, he was traded to the Florida Panthers in exchange for a fourth-round draft pick in 2011. He had his best season as a professional in his first season with Florida, scoring 20 goals and 41 points. After struggling in his next season-and-a-half, Santorelli was claimed on waivers by the Winnipeg Jets. Following the completion of his contract, he signed as a free agent with the Vancouver Canucks. Santorelli continued his journeyman status with stints in Toronto and Anaheim, as well as a brief return to Nashville in the following years.

Prior to his professional career, Santorelli played college hockey with the Northern Michigan University Wildcats. While there, he was named to the CCHA All-Rookie Team in 2005, the All-CCHA First Team in 2007 and won multiple team awards.

== Playing career ==
=== Amateur ===
Santorelli began his junior A ice hockey career playing for the Langley Hornets in the British Columbia Hockey League (BCHL). Following his first year, where he scored 24 goals and 52 points, Santorelli was traded to the Vernon Vipers in exchange for cash. Playing for Vernon, Santorelli scored 43 goals and 96 point in 60 games. He played in the BCHL All-Star Game and was named the team's Most Valuable Player (MVP). His play earned him a scholarship to play college hockey for Northern Michigan University (NMU). During the off-season, Santorelli was selected 178th overall in the 2004 NHL entry draft by the Nashville Predators.

In his first season with the NMU Wildcats, Santorelli led the Central Collegiate Hockey Association (CCHA) in freshman goal scoring with 16, while finishing third on the team with 30 points. For his performance, Santorelli was named to the CCHA All-Rookie Team. In the 2005 CCHA Tournament, the Wildcats defeated Western Michigan in the first round, but were eliminated by Alaska-Fairbanks in the second round. Santorelli did not score in the three-game first round series, but recorded a power play assist in the elimination game. In his sophomore season, Santorelli increased his point total to 33, though he scored one fewer goal. Finishing fourth in the Conference, NMU earned a first round bye for the 2006 CCHA Tournament. The Wildcats defeated Nebraska–Omaha in the quarterfinals, but lost their next game to top-seeded Miami University. By virtue of losing in the semi-finals, NMU qualified for the consolation game, where they were defeated by the University of Michigan. For his part Santorelli recorded a goal and two assists in the tournament.

As a junior, Santorelli had a breakout season, scoring 30 goals and 47 points. He led the Conference in goals and also led the Wildcats in points and plus-minus rating, with +6. At the end of the year, he was named to the All-American West Second Team and the All-CCHA First Team. NMU also awarded him the Gary Emmons Most Valuable Player Award, the Bill Joyce Best Forward Award and the Steve Bozek Plus-Minus Award. Despite Santorelli's strong season, the Wildcats finished in tenth place in the CCHA. At the 2007 CCHA Tournament, NMU faced seventh-placed Ohio State University in a best-of-three first round series. Facing elimination after a 6–2 loss, the Wildcats blew a two-goal first period lead, eventually going into overtime. Three minutes and 15 into the extra session, Santorelli set-up Dusty Collins for the game winning goal, forcing a third and deciding game. NMU won the third game and advanced to the quarterfinals, where they then lost to the University of Michigan. Santorelli finished tournament play with two goals and one assist in five games.

=== Professional ===
After his junior year, Santorelli signed a three-year, entry-level contract with the Nashville Predators. He began his professional career in the 2007–08 season playing for Nashville's American Hockey League (AHL) affiliate, the Milwaukee Admirals. In 80 games, Santorelli scored 21 goals and 42 points. Milwaukee finished fourth in the West Division and qualified for the playoffs. In the post-season, the Admirals were eliminated in the first round by the Chicago Wolves. Santorelli played in all six games of the series, but failed to register any points.

The following season, he was joined on the team by his younger brother Mark, who had been a fourth-round draft pick of the Predators. It marked the first time the brothers were on the same team together. Santorelli started the season strong, posting a 14-game point streak. In December, he scored 23 points in 14 games, which tied him for second in the AHL. For his efforts, he was named CCM/AHL Player of the Month. Shortly after earning the accolade, he was called up by the Predators to the NHL, and made his debut on January 8, 2009, against the Pittsburgh Penguins. After playing six games without recording a point, he was reassigned to the Admirals. In the AHL, Santorelli was named to the 2009 All-Star Classic. At the All-Star skills competition, Santorelli tied an AHL record by going four for four in the accuracy shooting event. In the All-Star Game, Santorelli finished as a –7 in a 14–11 Canadian AHL All-Stars loss. Santorelli finished the year with 27 goals and 70 points in 70 games with Milwaukee and played one more game for Nashville, recording two penalty minutes in seven games. The Admirals won the West Division and faced the Rockford IceHogs in the first round. The Admirals defeated Rockford and advanced to the second round, where they lost to the Houston Aeros in seven games. Santorelli was a point-per-game player in the playoffs, scoring 11 points in 11 games.

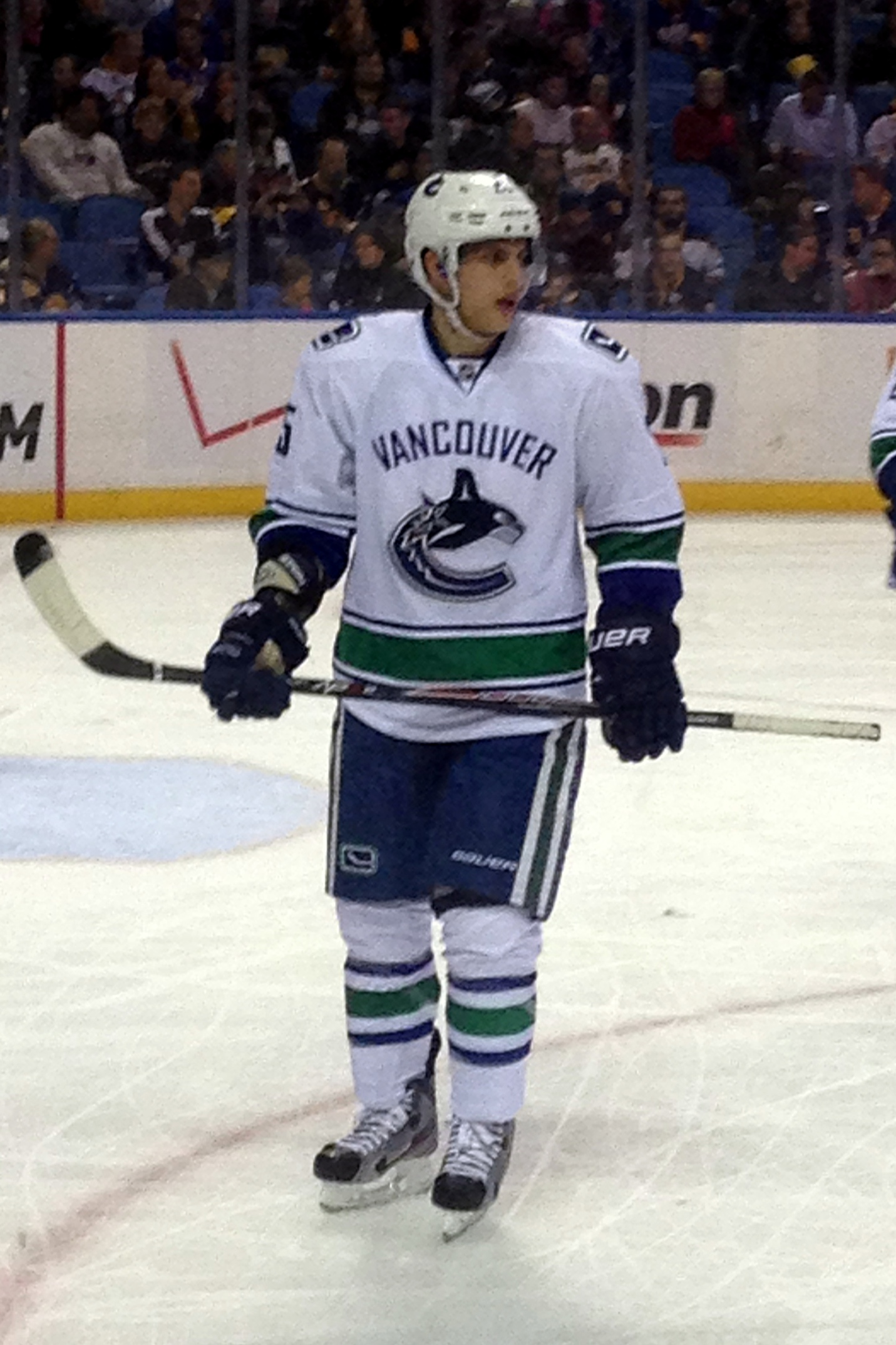
Santorelli playing with the Vancouver Canucks in 2013

He began the 2009–10 season with the Predators, playing five games before being sent down to Milwaukee. He was recalled 10 days later and scored his first career NHL goal on October 28, 2009 against the Minnesota Wild goaltender Niklas Bäckström. He continued to bounce in between Nashville and Milwaukee for the remainder of the season, registering 3 points in 25 games for the Predators and 59 points in 57 games with the Admirals. He joined Milwaukee for their playoffs, where they were eliminated in the first round by the Wolves, with Santorelli scoring 3 goals and seven points in the seven game series. In the off-season Nashville extended Santorelli a qualifying offer making him a restricted free agent. After being qualified Santorelli was traded to the Florida Panthers for a conditional fifth round pick in the 2011 NHL entry draft, which was eventually upgraded to a fourth round selection. After acquiring him Florida signed Santorelli to a one-year contract.

In Florida Santorelli was expected to play a similar role with the Panthers as he did with the Predators, a player who split time between the minors and played a fourth line role. In the preseason Santorelli beat out Michael Grabner and was given an opportunity to play on a scoring line with David Booth and Rostislav Olesz for the 2010–11 season. With the increased playing time and responsibility Santorelli set career highs in Games played, goals, assists, and points. Playing in all 82 games he recorded 20 goals and 41 points. Florida finished the season as the last place team in the Southeast Division and 28th in the league. In the off-season the Panthers re-signed Santorelli to a two-year contract. The following season he sustained a shoulder injury in a preseason game and missed the beginning of the season. Upon his return he struggled recording only 11 points in 60 games and was occasionally made a healthy scratch. The Panthers made the playoffs for the first time in 12 years, but Santorelli did not play in any of their playoff games. At the end of the season he was placed on waivers, allowing any team to claim his contract rights. Santorelli cleared waivers the following day and remained with the Panthers.

Prior to the start of the 2012–13 season the NHL's collective bargaining agreement expired and the owners enforced a lockout. During the lockout Santorelli signed with Tingsryds AIF in Sweden's second highest division the HockeyAllsvenskan, with whom his brother played. He played just four games with Tingsryds recording one assist before leaving the team due to a disagreement with their head coach. Following the conclusion of the lockout he re-joined the Panthers. After playing 24 games in the shortened season registering two goals and an assist he was placed on waivers and claimed by the Winnipeg Jets. He recorded one assist in 10 games with the Jets. A free agent at season's end Santorelli signed with his hometown Vancouver Canucks.

After one season with the Canucks, who failed to make the playoffs, Santorelli signed a one-year, $1.5 million contract with the Toronto Maple Leafs on July 3, 2014.

With the Leafs slipping down the standings, and setting their eyes on rebuilding, Santorelli was traded to Nashville, along with Cody Franson, in exchange for a 1st round pick, Brendan Leipsic, and Olli Jokinen. This marked both Santorelli's and Franson's second tenure with Nashville. Santorelli scored his first career playoff goal in Game 2 of Nashville's Western Conference Quarter Finals series against the Chicago Blackhawks.

Following the 2014–15 season, Santorelli became an unrestricted free agent. On August 17, 2015, he signed a one-year contract with the Anaheim Ducks.

After 7 seasons within the NHL, Santorelli left North America as a free agent, signing a two-year contract with Swiss club, Genève-Servette HC of the NLA on July 28, 2016. He made his NLA debut on September 9, 2016 against Fribourg-Gottéron and scored his first NLA goal that same day, tying the game late in the third period. After only 6 games in the 2016-17 season, Santorelli sustained an injury in practice and missed the next 4 games. On October 1, 2016, it was announced that Santorelli would leave Genève-Servette after only 6 games for personal reasons. It was later announced that Santorelli was suffering from nagging injuries which would not allow him to return to the game. He eventually announced his retirement from professional hockey.

== Career statistics ==
| | | | Regular season | | | | | Playoffs |
| Season | Team | League | GP | G | A | Pts | PIM | GP | G | A | Pts | PIM |
|---|---|---|---|---|---|---|---|---|---|---|---|---|
| 2001–02 | Port Coquitlam Buckaroos | PIJHL | 42 | 23 | 24 | 47 | 34 | — | — | — | — | — |
| 2002–03 | Langley Hornets | BCHL | 60 | 24 | 28 | 52 | 18 | — | — | — | — | — |
| 2003–04 | Vernon Vipers | BCHL | 60 | 43 | 53 | 96 | 26 | 5 | 0 | 2 | 2 | 0 |
| 2004–05 | Northern Michigan University | CCHA | 40 | 16 | 14 | 30 | 22 | — | — | — | — | — |
| 2005–06 | Northern Michigan University | CCHA | 40 | 15 | 18 | 33 | 24 | — | — | — | — | — |
| 2006–07 | Northern Michigan University | CCHA | 41 | 30 | 17 | 47 | 28 | — | — | — | — | — |
| 2007–08 | Milwaukee Admirals | AHL | 80 | 21 | 21 | 42 | 60 | 6 | 0 | 0 | 0 | 2 |
| 2008–09 | Milwaukee Admirals | AHL | 70 | 27 | 43 | 70 | 36 | 11 | 6 | 5 | 11 | 6 |
| 2008–09 | Nashville Predators | NHL | 7 | 0 | 0 | 0 | 2 | — | — | — | — | — |
| 2009–10 | Nashville Predators | NHL | 25 | 2 | 1 | 3 | 8 | — | — | — | — | — |
| 2009–10 | Milwaukee Admirals | AHL | 57 | 26 | 33 | 59 | 20 | 7 | 3 | 4 | 7 | 2 |
| 2010–11 | Florida Panthers | NHL | 82 | 20 | 21 | 41 | 20 | — | — | — | — | — |
| 2011–12 | Florida Panthers | NHL | 60 | 9 | 2 | 11 | 18 | — | — | — | — | — |
| 2012–13 | Tingsryds AIF | Allsv | 4 | 0 | 1 | 1 | 0 | — | — | — | — | — |
| 2012–13 | San Antonio Rampage | AHL | 7 | 2 | 3 | 5 | 0 | — | — | — | — | — |
| 2012–13 | Florida Panthers | NHL | 24 | 2 | 1 | 3 | 2 | — | — | — | — | — |
| 2012–13 | Winnipeg Jets | NHL | 10 | 0 | 1 | 1 | 0 | — | — | — | — | — |
| 2013–14 | Vancouver Canucks | NHL | 49 | 10 | 18 | 28 | 6 | — | — | — | — | — |
| 2014–15 | Toronto Maple Leafs | NHL | 57 | 11 | 18 | 29 | 8 | — | — | — | — | — |
| 2014–15 | Nashville Predators | NHL | 22 | 1 | 3 | 4 | 6 | 4 | 1 | 0 | 1 | 0 |
| 2015–16 | Anaheim Ducks | NHL | 70 | 9 | 9 | 18 | 8 | — | — | — | — | — |
| 2016–17 | Genève–Servette HC | NLA | 6 | 1 | 3 | 4 | 4 | — | — | — | — | — |
| AHL totals | | | 214 | 76 | 100 | 176 | 116 | 24 | 9 | 9 | 18 | 10 |
| NHL totals | | | 406 | 64 | 74 | 138 | 78 | 4 | 1 | 0 | 1 | 0 |

== Awards and honours ==
| Award | Year |
|---|---|
College
| All-CCHA Rookie Team | 2004–05 |
| All-CCHA First Team | 2006–07 |
| AHCA West Second-Team All-American | 2006–07 |
Northern Michigan University
| Gary Emmons Most Valuable Player Award | 2006–07 |
| Bill Joyce Best Forward Award | 2006–07 |
| Steve Bozek Plus-Minus Award | 2006–07 |
AHL
| All-Star Game participant | 2009 |
| Burnaby Sports hall of fame inductee | 2023 |
