= 2018 Royal Bank Cup =

National Junior A Championship

Tournament details
- Venue(s): Prospera Centre in Chilliwack, BC
- Dates: May 12 – 20, 2018
- Teams: 5 (4 regional champions + host)
- Host team: Chilliwack Chiefs

Final positions
- Champions: Chilliwack Chiefs
- Runners-up: Wellington Dukes

Tournament statistics
- Games played: 13
- Scoring leader: Jasper Weatherby Wenatchee Wild

Awards
- MVP: Will Calverley Chilliwack Chiefs

The 2018 Royal Bank Cup was the 48th Canadian junior A Ice Hockey National Championship for the Canadian Junior Hockey League and the 48th consecutive year a national championship was awarded to this skill level since the breakaway of Major Junior hockey in 1970. The tournament was played at the Prospera Centre in Chilliwack, British Columbia.

== Teams ==
- Chilliwack Chiefs (Host)

Regular Season: 26-26-3-3 (4th BCHL Mainland Division)
Playoffs: Lost 3-4 Prince George Spruce Kings
Playoffs Record: 3 wins - 4 losses

- Wenatchee Wild (Pacific)

Regular Season: 37-16-4-1 (3rd BCHL Interior Division)
Playoffs: Won 1st Rd 4-0 Merritt Centennials - Won 2nd Rd 4-2 Vernon Vipers
Won Semi Final 4-1 Trail Smoke Eaters - Won BCHL 4-1 Prince George Spruce Kings
Won Doyle Cup 4-1 Spruce Grove Saints
Playoffs Record: 20 wins - 5 losses

- Steinbach Pistons (Western)

Regular Season: 48-8-2-2 (1st MJHL)
Playoffs: Won Quarter-finals 4-0 Swan Valley Stampeders - Won Semi-finals 4-2 Winnipeg Blues - Won MJHL 4-2 Virden Oil Capitals
Won ANAVET Cup 4-2 Nipawin Hawks
Playoffs Record: 16 win - 6 losses

- Wellington Dukes (Central)

Regular Season: 33-13-3-5 (1st OJHL East Division)
Playoffs: Won N-E Quarters 4-3 Pickering Panthers - Won N-E Semis 4-3 Newmarket Hurricanes
Won N-E Finals 4-1 Aurora Tigers - Won OJHL 4-2 Georgetown Raiders
Dudley Hewitt Cup: Round Robin 2 wins 1 loss -third place - Won Semifinal game 6-3 Thunder Bay North Stars
Won Championship Game 7-4 Dryden Ice Dogs
Playoffs Record: 20 wins - 10 losses

- Ottawa Jr. Senators (Eastern)

Regular Season: 46-9-5-2 (1st CCHL Yzerman Division)
Playoffs: Won Quarter-Finals 4-2 Pembroke Lumber Kings - Won Semi-Finals 4-3 Brockville Braves - Won CCHL 4-1 Carleton Place Canadians
Fred Page Cup: Round Robin 2 wins 1 overtime win -first place - Won Championship Game 10-1 Longueuil College Francais
Playoffs Record: 15 wins - 7 losses

== Tournament ==
=== Round-robin ===
RBC Cup Round-robin
Rank	Team	League	Ticket	W–OTW–OTL–L	GF	GA	Pts
1	Wenatchee Wild	BCHL	Pacific	2–2–0–0	16	7	10
2	Chilliwack Chiefs	BCHL	Host	2–1–1–0	11	6	9
3	Ottawa Jr. Senators	CCHL	Eastern	0–2–2–0	12	12	6
4	Wellington Dukes	OJHL	Central	0–1–1–2	5	13	3
5	Steinbach Pistons	MJHL	Western	0–0–2–2	10	16	2

==== Schedule and results ====
All games played at Prospera Centre

Game	Away team	Score	Home team	Score	Notes
May 12, 2018
1	Wellington Dukes	1	Ottawa Jr. Senators	2	Final OT – Shots: 26–21 OTT
2	Wenatchee Wild	2	Chilliwack Chiefs	1	Final OT – Shots: 34–19 WEN
May 13, 2018
3	Steinbach Pistons	3	Wenatchee Wild	4	Final – Shots: 32–19 WEN
4	Chilliwack Chiefs	4	Ottawa Jr. Senators	3	Final OT – Shots: 34–26 CWK
May 14, 2018
5	Steinbach Pistons	2	Wellington Dukes	3	Final OT – Shots: 29–29
May 15, 2018
6	Ottawa Jr. Senators	2	Wenatchee Wild	3	Final SO – Shots: 38–26 WEN
7	Wellington Dukes	0	Chilliwack Chiefs	2	Final – Shots: 42–26 CWK
May 16, 2018
8	Ottawa Jr. Senators	5	Steinbach Pistons	4	Final OT – Shots: 42–22 OTT
May 17, 2018
9	Wenatchee Wild	7	Wellington Dukes	1	Final – Shots: 41–19 WEN
10	Chilliwack Chiefs	4	Steinbach Pistons	1	Final – Shots: 41–26 CWK

==== Semifinals results ====
Game	Away team	Score	Home team	Score	Notes
May 19, 2018
SF1	Wellington Dukes	2	Wenatchee Wild	1	Final – Shots: 51–14 WEN
SF2	Ottawa Jr. Senators	2	Chilliwack Chiefs	3	Final – Shots: 30–28 CWK

==== Final results ====
Game	Away team	Score	Home team	Score	Notes
May 20, 2018
Final	Wellington Dukes	2	Chilliwack Chiefs	4	Final

== Awards ==
Roland Mercier Trophy (Tournament MVP): Will Calverley Chilliwack Chiefs
Top Forward: Jasper Weatherby Wenatchee Wild
Top Defencemen: Darby Gula Steinbach Pistons
Top Goaltender: Daniel Chenard Chilliwack Chiefs
Tubby Schmalz Trophy (Sportsmanship): Zach Salloum Ottawa Jr. Senators
Top Scorer: Jasper Weatherby Wenatchee Wild

== Roll of League Champions ==
AJHL: Spruce Grove Saints
BCHL: Wenatchee Wild
CCHL: Ottawa Jr. Senators
MHL: Edmundston Blizzard
MJHL: Steinbach Pistons
NOJHL: Cochrane Crunch
OJHL: Wellington Dukes
QJHL: Longueuil Collège Français
SJHL: Nipawin Hawks
SIJHL: Dryden Ice Dogs

== Sources ==
- Svoboda, Paul (8 May 2018). "The ABC's of the RBC: National Jr. A hockey field finalized as Steinbach captures ANAVET Cup". Bellevue Intelligencer. Postmedia.
- "2018 RBC Cup | National Junior A Hockey Championship". hockeycanada.ca.
- Svoboda, Paul (11 May 2018). "Dukes face former Bulls goalie in all-Ontario opener at RBC Cup in BC". Bellevue Intelligencer. Postmedia.
- Bailey, Jim (7 May 2018). "Wenatchee Wild wins Doyle Cup, off to national championship". Trail Times. Black Press Media.
- Clarke, Ted (13 May 2018). "Pateman gets call as RBC Cup referee". Prince George Citizen.
