= 2006 in ice hockey =

The following is a chronicle of events during the year 2006 in ice hockey.

== National Hockey League ==
- 2006 Stanley Cup: The Carolina Hurricanes defeated the Edmonton Oilers in seven games to capture their first Stanley Cup.
- In the Western Conference, it was a year of upsets, as the top four seeds in the playoffs all fell in the first round, the first time this has happened since the NHL moved to a conference playoff format in 1994. In the Eastern Conference, however, the top four seeds all advanced. It was a disappointing playoffs for last seasons finalists, as both the defending champion Tampa Bay Lightning and their finals opponents the Calgary Flames were defeated in the first round.
- On February 6, Phoenix Coyotes assistant coach, Rick Tocchet was arrested by New Jersey State Police on the suspicion that he was involved in an illegal gambling ring with ties to the Bruno-Scarfo crime family. Janet Gretzky, wife of Coyotes' head coach, Wayne Gretzky, was also implicated. The police dubbed the investigation Operation Slapshot.
- On June 6, Chris Pronger scores on Cam Ward, marking the first successful penalty shot in the Stanley Cup Finals history.
- The newly renamed Anaheim Ducks began the season by earning a point in 16 consecutive games (12-0-4) to break the Edmonton Oilers record of 15 set in 1984.
- The Russian Ice Hockey Federation launched lawsuits against the NHL, the Oilers, the Pittsburgh Penguins and the Calgary Flames after players Evgeni Malkin, Andrei Taratukhin and Alexei Mikhnov left their Russian teams to sign with the NHL despite having valid contracts in Europe.
- Malkin would set a modern NHL record by scoring a goal in each of his first six games with the Penguins.

== Canadian Hockey League ==
- The 2006 Memorial Cup was won by the Quebec Remparts, who defeated the Moncton Wildcats 6-2 in the final.
- Ontario Hockey League: The Peterborough Petes defeated the London Knights to capture the J. Ross Robertson Cup.
- Quebec Major Junior Hockey League: The Moncton Wildcats captured their first President's Cup by defeating the Quebec Remparts.
- Western Hockey League: The Vancouver Giants won the President's Cup for the first time after defeating the Moose Jaw Warriors.

== XX Olympic Games ==
- Sweden captured the men's gold medal at the 2006 Olympic games. The Czech Republic won the bronze.
- Canada defeated Sweden to capture the women's gold medal. The United States won the bronze. Sweden's defeat of the Americans in the semi-finals in a shoot out was perhaps the greatest upset in women's hockey history, as it marked the first time in major tournament history that a team other than Canada or the United States played for the championship.

== International hockey ==
- Led by unlikely goaltending hero, Justin Pogge, Canada successfully defended their 2005 title by defeating Russia in the final to win the 2006 World Junior Ice Hockey Championships at Vancouver, British Columbia.
- Sweden defeated the Czech Republic to win the 2006 Men's World Ice Hockey Championships at Riga, Latvia.

== European hockey ==
- Russian Hockey Super League: The Russian national championship was captured by AK Bars Kazan.
- Elitserien: Färjestads BK captured the Swedish Elite League title.
- SM-liiga: HPK won the Finnish national championship.
- Deutsche Eishockey Liga: Eisbären Berlin won the German national championship.

== Women's hockey ==
- National Women's Hockey League: The Montreal Axion defeated the Brampton Thunder for the NWHL Championship Cup.
- Western Women's Hockey League: The Calgary Oval X-Treme defeated the Minnesota Whitecaps for the WWHL Champions Cup.
- On July 13, 2006, the two leagues announced a merger that would see the former WWHL teams compete in the new Western Division of the NWHL.

== Minor League hockey ==
- American Hockey League: The Hershey Bears won the Calder Cup, defeating the Milwaukee Admirals.
- ECHL: The Alaska Aces won the Kelly Cup, defeating the Gwinnett Gladiators.
- United Hockey League: The Kalamazoo Wings won the Colonial Cup, defeating the Danbury Trashers.
- Central Hockey League: The Laredo Bucks won the Ray Miron President's Cup by defeating the Bossier-Shreveport Mudbugs.

== Junior A hockey ==
- Canadian Junior A Hockey League:The Burnaby Express of the BCHL defeated the Yorkton Terriers of the SJHL to win the 2006 Royal Bank Cup as Canadian "Junior A" national champions.
- United States Hockey League:The Des Moines Buccaneers defeated the Sioux Falls Stampede to capture the Clark Cup.

== Season articles ==
2005–06 NHL season	2006–07 NHL season
2005–06 AHL season	2006–07 AHL season
2005–06 ECHL season	2006–07 ECHL season
2005–06 OHL season	2006–07 OHL season
2005–06 QMJHL season	2006–07 QMJHL season
2005–06 WHL season	2006–07 WHL season
