= Ray Macias =

American ice hockey player (born 1986)

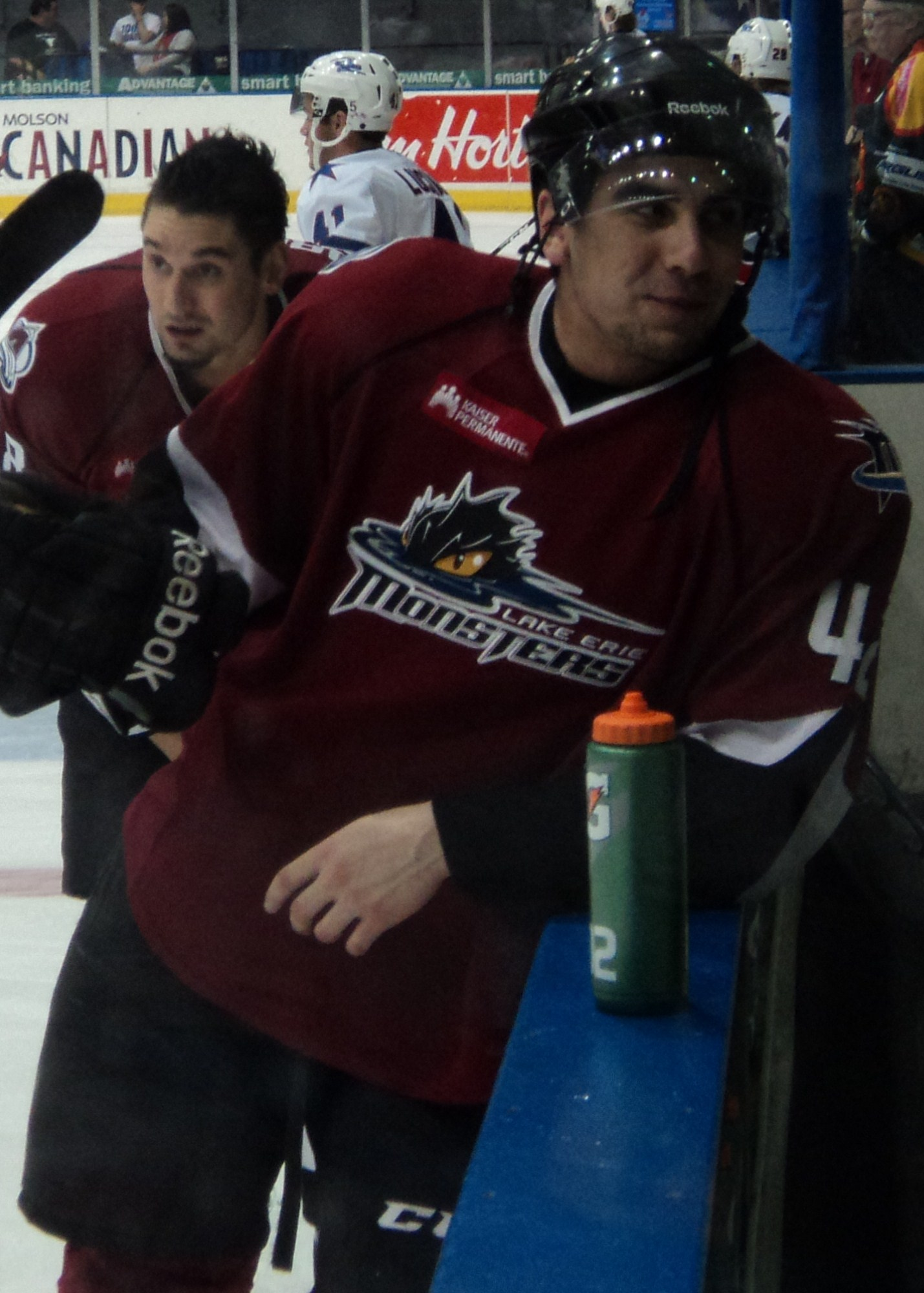
- Born: September 18, 1986 (age 39) Long Beach, California, U.S.
- Height: 6 ft 1 in (185 cm)
- Weight: 198 lb (90 kg; 14 st 2 lb)
- Position: Defense
- Shot: Right
- Played for: Colorado Avalanche; Schwenninger Wild Wings; Braehead Clan
- NHL draft: 124th overall, 2005; Colorado Avalanche
- Playing career: 2007–2015

Raymond Jonathan Macias (born September 18, 1986) is an American former professional ice hockey defenseman who played in the National Hockey League (NHL) for the Colorado Avalanche.

== Playing career ==
Macias was drafted 124th overall in the 2005 NHL entry draft by the Colorado Avalanche from the Kamloops Blazers of the Western Hockey League. After his final year with the Blazers, Macias was signed by the Avalanche to a three-year, entry-level contract on April 11, 2007.

Macias made his professional debut in the 2007–08 season, with the Lake Erie Monsters of the AHL. Upon the end of the season he was sent to junior affiliate, the Johnstown Chiefs of the ECHL, for their playoff run. In the 2008–09 season, Macias started the year with the Chiefs before spending the majority of the season with the Monsters. On March 31, 2009, Macias received his first NHL recall. He made his NHL debut with the Avalanche in a 3-0 defeat to the Phoenix Coyotes on April 1, 2009.

During the 2010–11 season, on January 1, 2011, Macias played in his 160th game for the Monsters which became the most games played by a player in franchise history, a record previously held by Wes O'Neill and later surpassed by Justin Mercier. Macias finished the season with 183 career games for the Monsters before leaving as a free agent from the Avalanche.

Unable to attract an NHL contract, Macias signed a one-year contract with the Reading Royals of the ECHL on September 21, 2011. Despite attending the Los Angeles Kings training camp on a try-out for the 2011–12 season, Macias returned to the Royals to play the majority of the season. He posted 20 points in 38 games while also experiencing two short stints played in the AHL for the Springfield Falcons and the Toronto Marlies.

On June 24, 2012, Macias signed his first European contract, a one-year deal with German second division team, Schwenninger Wild Wings. In the 2012–13 season with the Wild Wings, whilst finishing as finalists, Macias placed second amongst blueliners in scoring with 18 points in 39 games.

On July 31, 2013, Macias remained abroad to sign a one-year contract in the United Kingdom with Braehead Clan of the EIHL. Macias contributed with 2 goals and 5 points in 8 games with the Clan, before opting to be released from his contract in order to return home and spend time away from professional hockey on November 4, 2013.

On June 23, 2014, Macias returned to professional hockey, signing as a free agent to a one-year contract in the Slovak Extraliga with HC ’05 Banská Bystrica. After he was released from his contract without appearing for the club, Macias remained in Europe, agreeing to an initial two week trial with Hungarian club, Alba Volán Székesfehérvár who compete in the EBEL on September 1, 2014. Unable to secure a playing contract in Europe, he signed a contract with the Utah Grizzlies on January 23, 2015.

On August 5, 2015, Macias continued his professional career in the ECHL, signing as a free agent to a one-year deal with the Wichita Thunder. After attending the Thunder's training camp in preparation for the 2015–16 season, Macias was released from his contract on October 8, 2015.

== Career statistics ==
			Regular season					Playoffs
Season	Team	League	GP	G	A	Pts	PIM	GP	G	A	Pts	PIM
2002–03	Los Angeles Jr. Kings	16U AAA	49	37	26	63	100	—	—	—	—	—
2002–03	Kamloops Blazers	WHL	4	0	0	0	0	2	0	0	0	0
2003–04	Kamloops Blazers	WHL	69	12	17	29	14	5	2	0	2	0
2004–05	Kamloops Blazers	WHL	69	12	35	47	18	2	0	0	0	0
2005–06	Kamloops Blazers	WHL	68	12	26	38	34	—	—	—	—	—
2006–07	Kamloops Blazers	WHL	70	30	40	70	58	—	—	—	—	—
2007–08	Lake Erie Monsters	AHL	42	4	9	13	18	—	—	—	—	—
2007–08	Johnstown Chiefs	ECHL	5	0	5	5	0	6	1	3	4	2
2008–09	Johnstown Chiefs	ECHL	8	1	5	6	4	—	—	—	—	—
2008–09	Lake Erie Monsters	AHL	36	3	15	18	20	—	—	—	—	—
2008–09	Colorado Avalanche	NHL	6	0	1	1	0	—	—	—	—	—
2009–10	Lake Erie Monsters	AHL	52	7	10	17	16	—	—	—	—	—
2010–11	Lake Erie Monsters	AHL	43	3	11	14	28	4	0	0	0	0
2010–11	Colorado Avalanche	NHL	2	0	0	0	2	—	—	—	—	—
2011–12	Reading Royals	ECHL	38	6	14	20	40	5	0	0	0	0
2011–12	Springfield Falcons	AHL	3	1	2	3	0	—	—	—	—	—
2011–12	Toronto Marlies	AHL	2	0	0	0	0	—	—	—	—	—
2012–13	SERC Wild Wings	GER.2	39	9	9	18	16	12	0	1	1	12
2013–14	Braehead Clan	EIHL	8	2	3	5	4	—	—	—	—	—
2014–15	Utah Grizzlies	ECHL	16	1	1	2	9	1	0	0	0	0
NHL totals			8	0	1	1	2	—	—	—	—	—

== Awards and honors ==
Award	Year
CHL
All-Rookie Team	2003–04
WHL
West First All-Star Team	2007
