= Chilliwack Bruins =

Defunct ice hockey team

- City: Chilliwack, British Columbia
- League: Western Hockey League
- Conference: Western
- Division: B.C.
- Operated: 2006–2011
- Home arena: Prospera Centre
- Colours: Black, white, and cream

Franchise history
- 2006–2011: Chilliwack Bruins
- 2011–present: Victoria Royals

The Chilliwack Bruins were a Major Junior ice hockey team in the Western Hockey League (WHL) based in Chilliwack, British Columbia, Canada. The 2006–07 season marked the Bruins' inaugural season in the WHL. The team played at Prospera Centre, which was expanded to 5,386 seats for the arrival of the team. The Bruins were sold after the 2010–11 season and subsequently relocated to Victoria to become the Victoria Royals.

== History ==
In 2005, the City of Chilliwack was granted a WHL expansion team after an attempt by the owners of the Tri-City Americans (Brian Burke, Glen Sather and Darryl Porter) to move the Americans to Chilliwack was voted down by the WHL directors. As a result, Burke, Sather and Porter sold their stake in the Americans and purchased the 21st franchise in the WHL. The arrival of the Bruins displaced the British Columbia Hockey League (BCHL)'s Chilliwack Chiefs, who relocated to Langley to become the Langley Chiefs. In early 2011, it became apparent to fans that they had been sold to RG Properties to allow them to move the team to Victoria. The previous ownership group of the original Chilliwack Chiefs franchise before 2006 had an offer of $7.75 million from the Chiefs Development Group, including Major League Baseball player Justin Morneau and National Hockey League player Willie Mitchell. This offer was rejected by both the majority ownership of the Bruins as well as the league.

The Bruins opened their inaugural season in 2006–07 at Prospera Centre on September 21, 2006, defeating the Kelowna Rockets by a score of 3–1. Keith Voytechek scored the first goal in franchise history, while Alex Archibald earned the first win by a Bruins goaltender. A month later, on October 28, Archibald became the first Bruins goaltender to record a shutout with a 3–0 win over the Tri-City Americans, which also established the first Bruins road win. Forward Josh Aspenlind established another Bruins first later in the season with the franchise's first hat-trick on February 23, 2007, against the Kamloops Blazers. General Manager Darrell May and the team's first head coach, Jim Hiller, helped the Bruins post an overall record of 25–40–5–2, the third-best overall record for a WHL expansion team, qualifying for the post-season. In the 2007 playoffs, the Bruins played the eventual Memorial Cup champion Vancouver Giants in the first round and lost the series four games to one.

Bruins forwards Mark Santorelli and Oscar Moller emerged in the team's second season in 2007–08, establishing team-highs in all statistical categories. Santorelli set team-highs with 74 assists and 101 points, earning the team's first major WHL trophy by leading the League in scoring, while Moller scored a franchise-high 39 goals. The Bruins finished in seventh place in the Western Conference and lost to Vancouver in the first round. All games were decided by one goal.

After missing the playoffs in 2008–09, the Bruins fired head coach Jim Hiller. On June 3, 2009, the team named Marc Habscheid as the team's new head coach and general manager.

On March 25, 2025, the WHL hosted a media event in Chilliwack to announce the city's return to the league for the 2026–27 WHL season. At the event, league commissioner Dan Near admitted that "mistakes were made" when the Bruins franchise was sold and moved to Victoria in 2011. He apologized on behalf of the league to the community and said that he hoped that the new team would make up for it. Chilliwack mayor Ken Popove expressed in a radio show that he did not believe the return of WHL hockey was the right move for the city and worried about what this would mean for the Chilliwack Chiefs of the British Columbia Hockey League who also plays at the Chilliwack Coliseum. He later apologised for disrespecting the WHL.

== Season-by-season record ==
Note: GP = Games played, W = Wins, L = Losses, OTL = Overtime losses, SOL = Shootout losses, GF = Goals for, GA = Goals against

Season	GP	W	L	OTL	SOL	GF	GA	Points	Finish	Playoffs
2006–07	72	25	40	5	2	169	260	57	4th B.C.	Lost Western Conference quarter-final
2007–08	72	28	35	4	5	206	241	65	3rd B.C.	Lost Western Conference quarter-final
2008–09	72	19	46	2	5	154	267	45	5th B.C.	Out of playoffs
2009–10	72	32	33	2	5	215	239	71	4th B.C.	Lost Western Conference quarter-final
2010–11	72	33	31	4	4	227	255	74	3rd B.C.	Lost Western Conference quarter-final

== Team records ==
Team records for a single season
Statistic	Total	Season
Most points	74	2010–11
Most wins	33	2010–11
Fewest points	45	2008–09
Fewest wins	19	2008–09
Most goals for	227	2010–11
Fewest goals for	154	2008–09
Fewest goals against	239	2009–10
Most goals against	267	2008–09

Individual player records for a single season
Statistic	Player	Total	Season
Most goals	Ryan Howse	51	2010-11
Most assists	Mark Santorelli	74	2007–08
Most points	Mark Santorelli	101	2007–08
Most points, rookie	Mark Santorelli	82	2006–07
Most points, defenceman	Nick Holden	60	2007–08
Best GAA (goalie)	Matt Esposito	2.97	2006–07
Goalies = minimum 1500 minutes played

- Full List of Team Records

== NHL draftees ==
- Oscar Moller (Drafted by Los Angeles Kings in 2007; second round, 52nd overall)
- Mark Santorelli (Drafted by Nashville Predators in 2007; fourth round, 119th overall)
- Ryan Howse (Drafted by Calgary Flames in 2009; third round, 74th overall)
- Roman Horak (Drafted by New York Rangers in 2009; fifth round, 127th overall)
- Kevin Sundher (Drafted by Buffalo Sabres in 2010; third round, 75th overall)
- Tyler Stahl (Drafted by Carolina Hurricanes in 2010; sixth round, 167th overall)
- Dylen McKinlay (Drafted by Minnesota Wild in 2010; seventh round, 189th overall)

== NHL alumni ==
- Oscar Moller – Los Angeles Kings
- Nick Holden – Columbus Blue Jackets, Colorado Avalanche, New York Rangers, Boston Bruins, Vegas Golden Knights, Ottawa Senators
- Roman Horak – Calgary Flames, Edmonton Oilers
- Brandon Manning – Philadelphia Flyers, Edmonton Oilers

== See also ==
- List of ice hockey teams in British Columbia
