= 2006–07 WHL season =

Junior ice hockey season

- League: Western Hockey League
- Sport: Ice hockey
- Duration: Regular season September, 2007 – March, 2008; Playoffs; March – May, 2008
- Teams: 21
- TV partner: Shaw TV

Regular season
- Scotty Munro Memorial Trophy: Everett Silvertips (1)
- Season MVP: Kris Russell (Medicine Hat Tigers)
- Top scorer: Zach Hamill (Everett Silvertips)

Playoffs
- Playoffs MVP: Matt Keetley (Tigers)
- Finals champions: Medicine Hat Tigers (5)
- Runners-up: Vancouver Giants

WHL seasons
- 2005–06 2007–08

2006–07 CHL season
- League: Canadian Hockey League
- Sport: Ice hockey
- Duration: September 2006 – March 2007
- Teams: 59

OHL

QMJHL

WHL

Memorial Cup
- Finals champions: Vancouver Giants (WHL) (1st title)
- Runners-up: Medicine Hat Tigers (WHL)

The 2006–07 WHL season was the 41st season of the Western Hockey League (WHL). Twenty-one teams completed a 72-game season, with the Chilliwack Bruins competing in their inaugural season. The Everett Silvertips won their first Scotty Munro Memorial Trophy for the best regular season record. The Medicine Hat Tigers won the President's Cup, defeating the Vancouver Giants in seven games. However, the Giants captured the 2007 Memorial Cup as tournament hosts, defeating the Tigers in the championship game.

== League notes ==
- The Chilliwack Bruins joined the WHL as an expansion team, playing in the B.C. Division of the Western Conference. The Kootenay Ice returned to the Central Division of the Eastern Conference, while the Swift Current Broncos moved to the East Division of the Eastern Conference.
- On October 23, three players with the Moose Jaw Warriors were struck by a suspected drunk driver while returning home following a road trip. Two players were treated and released from hospital; however, Garrett Robinson was critically injured in the accident, leaving him in a coma. After the accident, the Warriors established the Garrett Robinson Recovery Fund to provide financial assistance to Robinson's family.
- The WHL announced at the Memorial Cup tournament that the league's championship trophy—until then, known as the President's Cup—would be renamed in honour of Ed Chynoweth, who served as WHL president from 1972 until 1995. The Tigers' championship was thus the last one played for the President's Cup under that name.

== Final standings ==
Map of WHL, 2006–07
East Division
Central Division
BC Division
US Division

=== Eastern Conference ===
| East Division | GP | W | L | OTL | SOL | GF | GA | Pts |
|---|---|---|---|---|---|---|---|---|
| Brandon Wheat Kings^{y} | 72 | 41 | 20 | 3 | 8 | 258 | 214 | 93 |
| Regina Pats^{x} | 72 | 36 | 28 | 2 | 6 | 234 | 220 | 80 |
| Swift Current Broncos^{x} | 72 | 33 | 36 | 1 | 2 | 199 | 241 | 69 |
| Prince Albert Raiders^{x} | 72 | 27 | 39 | 3 | 3 | 203 | 266 | 60 |
| Moose Jaw Warriors | 72 | 28 | 41 | 3 | 0 | 217 | 271 | 59 |
| Saskatoon Blades | 72 | 27 | 41 | 2 | 2 | 174 | 231 | 58 |

| Central Division | GP | W | L | OTL | SOL | GF | GA | Pts |
|---|---|---|---|---|---|---|---|---|
| Medicine Hat Tigers^{y} | 72 | 52 | 17 | 3 | 0 | 264 | 175 | 107 |
| Kootenay Ice^{x} | 72 | 49 | 17 | 3 | 3 | 267 | 189 | 104 |
| Calgary Hitmen^{x} | 72 | 39 | 26 | 3 | 4 | 251 | 205 | 85 |
| Red Deer Rebels^{x} | 72 | 35 | 28 | 4 | 5 | 206 | 214 | 79 |
| Lethbridge Hurricanes | 72 | 33 | 34 | 2 | 3 | 254 | 265 | 71 |

=== Western Conference ===
| B.C. Division | GP | W | L | OTL | SOL | GF | GA | Pts |
|---|---|---|---|---|---|---|---|---|
| Vancouver Giants^{y} | 72 | 45 | 17 | 3 | 7 | 245 | 143 | 100 |
| Kamloops Blazers^{x} | 72 | 40 | 26 | 4 | 2 | 245 | 222 | 86 |
| Prince George Cougars^{x} | 72 | 33 | 31 | 3 | 5 | 221 | 217 | 74 |
| Chilliwack Bruins^{x} | 72 | 25 | 40 | 5 | 2 | 169 | 260 | 57 |
| Kelowna Rockets | 72 | 22 | 41 | 5 | 4 | 156 | 245 | 53 |

| U.S. Division | GP | W | L | OTL | SOL | GF | GA | Pts |
|---|---|---|---|---|---|---|---|---|
| Everett Silvertips^{y} | 72 | 54 | 15 | 1 | 2 | 239 | 142 | 111 |
| Tri-City Americans^{x} | 72 | 47 | 23 | 1 | 1 | 240 | 190 | 96 |
| Seattle Thunderbirds^{x} | 72 | 37 | 21 | 3 | 11 | 209 | 186 | 88 |
| Spokane Chiefs^{x} | 72 | 36 | 28 | 4 | 4 | 232 | 217 | 80 |
| Portland Winter Hawks | 72 | 17 | 52 | 1 | 2 | 146 | 316 | 37 |

== Scoring leaders ==
Note: GP = Games played; G = Goals; A = Assists; Pts = Points; PIM = Penalty minutes

| Player | Team | GP | G | A | Pts | PIM |
|---|---|---|---|---|---|---|
| Zach Hamill | Everett Silvertips | 69 | 32 | 61 | 93 | 90 |
| Steve DaSilva | Kootenay Ice | 71 | 38 | 53 | 91 | 108 |
| Zach Boychuk | Lethbridge Hurricanes | 69 | 31 | 60 | 91 | 52 |
| Ryan White | Calgary Hitmen | 72 | 34 | 55 | 89 | 97 |
| Codey Burki | Brandon Wheat Kings | 70 | 36 | 49 | 85 | 83 |
| Martin Hanzal | Red Deer Rebels | 60 | 26 | 59 | 85 | 94 |
| Mitch Fadden | Lethbridge Hurricanes | 71 | 36 | 48 | 84 | 54 |
| Riley Holzapfel | Moose Jaw Warriors | 72 | 39 | 43 | 82 | 94 |
| Mark Santorelli | Chilliwack Bruins | 72 | 29 | 53 | 82 | 46 |
| Mark Derlago | Brandon Wheat Kings | 72 | 46 | 35 | 81 | 34 |

=== Goaltending leaders ===
Note: GP = Games played; Min = Minutes played; W = Wins; L = Losses; SOL = Shootout losses; GA = Goals against; SO = Total shutouts; SV% = Save percentage; GAA = Goals against average

| Player | Team | GP | Min | W | L | SOL | GA | SO | SV% | GAA |
|---|---|---|---|---|---|---|---|---|---|---|
| Tyson Sexsmith | Vancouver Giants | 51 | 3047 | 31 | 14 | 8 | 91 | 10 | .915 | 1.79 |
| Leland Irving | Everett Silvertips | 48 | 2802 | 34 | 10 | 2 | 87 | 11 | .929 | 1.86 |
| David Reekie | Regina/Everett | 31 | 1796 | 21 | 9 | 0 | 59 | 3 | .917 | 1.97 |
| Derek Yeomans | Seattle Thunderbirds | 55 | 3304 | 30 | 15 | 9 | 117 | 5 | .917 | 2.12 |
| Taylor Dakers | Kootenay Ice | 48 | 2831 | 33 | 12 | 2 | 102 | 5 | .919 | 2.16 |

== 2007 WHL Playoffs ==
=== Overview ===
Conference Quarter-finals | Conference Semi-finals
C1 | Medicine Hat | 4
C4 | Red Deer | 3
C1 | Medicine Hat | 4
E2 | Regina | 0
E3 | Swift Current | 2
E2 | Regina | 4
Eastern
E1 | Brandon | 4
E4 | Prince Albert | 1
E1 | Brandon | 2
C3 | Calgary | 4
C3 | Calgary | 4
C2 | Kootenay | 3
B1 | Vancouver | 4
B4 | Chilliwack | 1
B1 | Vancouver | 4
U3 | Seattle | 1
U3 | Seattle | 4
U2 | Tri-City | 2
Western
U1 | Everett | 4
U4 | Spokane | 2
U1 | Everett | 2
B3 | Prince George | 4
B3 | Prince George | 4
B2 | Kamloops | 0

Conference Finals
C1 | Medicine Hat | 4
C3 | Calgary | 1
B1 | Vancouver | 4
B3 | Prince George | 1

WHL Championship
C1 | Medicine Hat | 4
B1 | Vancouver | 3

- Note: In the first round, the first place team in each division plays the fourth place team; the second place team faces the third. After the first round, the four remaining teams in each conference are re-seeded by regular season record.

=== Conference quarterfinals ===
==== Eastern Conference ====
Brandon vs. Prince Albert
| Date | Away | Home | |
|---|---|---|---|
| March 23 | Prince Albert 3 | 4 Brandon | OT |
| March 24 | Prince Albert 2 | 3 Brandon | OT |
| Mar 28 | Brandon 0 | 2 Prince Albert | |
| Mar 29 | Brandon 7 | 3 Prince Albert | |
| Mar 31 | Brandon 4 | 2 Prince Albert | |
Brandon wins 4–1

Medicine Hat vs. Red Deer
| Date | Away | Home |
|---|---|---|
| March 23 | Red Deer 6 | 2 Medicine Hat |
| March 24 | Red Deer 0 | 5 Medicine Hat |
| March 27 | Medicine Hat 5 | 3 Red Deer |
| March 28 | Medicine Hat 4 | 6 Red Deer |
| March 30 | Red Deer 0 | 4 Medicine Hat |
| April 1 | Medicine Hat 5 | 6 Red Deer |
| April 3 | Red Deer 0 | 2 Medicine Hat |
Medicine Hat wins 4–3

Regina vs. Swift Current
| Date | Away | Home | |
|---|---|---|---|
| March 23 | Swift Current 0 | 4 Regina | |
| March 24 | Swift Current 4 | 3 Regina | |
| March 27 | Regina 5 | 4 Swift Current | |
| March 28 | Regina 5 | 2 Swift Current | |
| March 30 | Swift Current 3 | 2 Regina | |
| April 1 | Regina 2 | 1 Swift Current | OT |
Regina wins 4–2

Kootenay vs. Calgary
| Date | Away | Home | |
|---|---|---|---|
| March 23 | Calgary 2 | 1 Kootenay | |
| March 24 | Calgary 2 | 4 Kootenay | |
| March 28 | Kootenay 2 | 3 Calgary | |
| March 29 | Kootenay 4 | 5 Calgary | OT |
| March 31 | Calgary 0 | 4 Kootenay | |
| April 2 | Kootenay 4 | 3 Calgary | |
| April 4 | Calgary 3 | 2 Kootenay | OT |
Calgary wins 4–3

==== Western Conference ====
Vancouver vs. Chilliwack
| Date | Away | Home | |
|---|---|---|---|
| March 23 | Chilliwack 4 | 5 Vancouver | OT |
| March 24 | Chilliwack 3 | 1 Vancouver | |
| March 27 | Vancouver 4 | 0 Chilliwack | |
| March 28 | Vancouver 5 | 1 Chilliwack | |
| March 30 | Chilliwack 1 | 3 Vancouver | |
Vancouver wins 4–1

Everett vs. Spokane
| Date | Away | Home | |
|---|---|---|---|
| March 23 | Spokane 2 | 4 Everett | |
| March 24 | Spokane 2 | 3 Everett | OT |
| March 27 | Everett 2 | 3 Spokane | |
| March 28 | Everett 1 | 3 Spokane | |
| March 30 | Spokane 1 | 5 Everett | |
| April 1 | Everett 4 | 1 Spokane | |
Everett wins 4–2

Kamloops vs. Prince George
| Date | Away | Home | |
|---|---|---|---|
| March 23 | Prince George 3 | 2 Kamloops | OT |
| March 24 | Prince George 5 | 4 Kamloops | OT |
| March 27 | Kamloops 3 | 4 Prince George | |
| March 28 | Kamloops 3 | 4 Prince George | OT |
Prince George wins 4–0

Tri-City vs. Seattle
| Date | Away | Home | |
|---|---|---|---|
| March 23 | Seattle 2 | 0 Tri-City | |
| March 24 | Seattle 1 | 2 Tri-City | |
| March 27 | Tri-City 1 | 3 Seattle | |
| March 28 | Tri-City 0 | 2 Seattle | |
| March 30 | Seattle 4 | 5 Tri-City | OT |
| March 31 | Tri-City 2 | 7 Seattle | |
Seattle wins 4–2

=== Conference semifinals ===
Eastern Conference

Medicine Hat vs. Regina
| Date | Away | Home | |
|---|---|---|---|
| April 7 | Regina 1 | 4 Medicine Hat | |
| April 9 | Regina 2 | 7 Medicine Hat | |
| April 11 | Medicine Hat 2 | 1 Regina | OT |
| April 13 | Medicine Hat 6 | 3 Regina | |
Medicine Hat wins 4–0

Brandon vs. Calgary
| Date | Away | Home | |
|---|---|---|---|
| April 6 | Calgary 3 | 4 Brandon | OT |
| April 7 | Calgary 2 | 3 Brandon | |
| April 10 | Brandon 1 | 8 Calgary | |
| April 11 | Brandon 1 | 5 Calgary | |
| April 13 | Calgary 5 | 4 Brandon | OT |
| April 15 | Brandon 1 | 4 Calgary | |
Calgary wins 4–2

Western Conference

Everett vs. Prince George
| Date | Away | Home | |
|---|---|---|---|
| April 6 | Prince George 2 | 3 Everett | |
| April 7 | Prince George 2 | 3 Everett | OT |
| April 10 | Everett 1 | 5 Prince George | |
| April 11 | Everett 3 | 4 Prince George | OT |
| April 14 | Prince George 4 | 3 Everett | |
| April 16 | Everett 2 | 8 Prince George | |
Prince George wins 4–2

Vancouver vs. Seattle
| Date | Away | Home | |
|---|---|---|---|
| April 6 | Seattle 4 | 3 Vancouver | OT |
| April 7 | Seattle 1 | 3 Vancouver | |
| April 10 | Vancouver 9 | 2 Seattle | |
| April 11 | Vancouver 3 | 1 Seattle | |
| April 13 | Seattle 1 | 5 Vancouver | |
Vancouver wins 4–1

=== Conference finals ===
Eastern Conference

Medicine Hat vs. Calgary
| Date | Away | Home | |
|---|---|---|---|
| April 20 | Calgary 0 | 2 Medicine Hat | |
| April 21 | Calgary 1 | 4 Medicine Hat | |
| April 23 | Medicine Hat 2 | 4 Calgary | |
| April 25 | Medicine Hat 3 | 1 Calgary | |
| April 27 | Calgary 3 | 4 Medicine Hat | OT |
Medicine Hat wins 4–1

Western Conference

Vancouver vs. Prince George
| Date | Away | Home | |
|---|---|---|---|
| April 20 | Prince George 2 | 3 Vancouver | |
| April 21 | Prince George 2 | 6 Vancouver | |
| April 24 | Vancouver 4 | 1 Prince George | |
| April 25 | Vancouver 2 | 3 Prince George | OT |
| April 27 | Prince George 1 | 5 Vancouver | |
Vancouver wins 4–1

=== WHL Championship ===
Vancouver vs. Medicine Hat
| Date | Away | Home | |
|---|---|---|---|
| May 4 | Vancouver 1 | 0 Medicine Hat | |
| May 5 | Vancouver 2 | 3 Medicine Hat | |
| May 8 | Medicine Hat 3 | 2 Vancouver | OT |
| May 9 | Medicine Hat 0 | 4 Vancouver | |
| May 11 | Medicine Hat 0 | 3 Vancouver | |
| May 13 | Vancouver 3 | 4 Medicine Hat | |
| May 14 | Vancouver 2 | 3 Medicine Hat | 2OT |
Medicine Hat wins 4–3

=== Memorial Cup ===
The Vancouver Giants hosted the 2007 Memorial Cup tournament, which also featured the WHL champion Medicine Hat Tigers. The Plymouth Whalers represented the Ontario Hockey League, and the Lewiston Maineiacs represented the Quebec Major Junior Hockey League.

The Tigers earned a spot in the Championship game with a 2–1 round robin record, falling 3–1 to the Maineiacs before defeating the Whalers 4–1, and the Giants 1–0. The Giants also finished 2–1, defeating Plymouth 4–3 in overtime and Lewiston 2–1. Their loss to Medicine Hat dropped them into a semifinal game. The Giants prevailed in the semifinal to meet the Tigers in the final, and defeated Medicine Hat 3–1 to take the title.

== 2006 ADT Canada-Russia Challenge ==
On November 29, the WHL defeated the Russian Selects 5–3 before a crowd of 4,404 at Chilliwack, British Columbia.

On November 30, the WHL defeated the Russian Selects 8–1 before a crowd of 4,136 at Kamloops, British Columbia.

== WHL awards ==
| Four Broncos Memorial Trophy | Player of the Year | Kris Russell | Medicine Hat Tigers |
| Daryl K. (Doc) Seaman Trophy | Scholastic Player of the Year | Keith Aulie | Brandon Wheat Kings |
| Jim Donlevy Memorial Trophy | Scholastic team of the Year | Kamloops Blazers | |
| Bob Clarke Trophy | Top Scorer | Zach Hamill | Everett Silvertips |
| Brad Hornung Trophy | Most Sportsmanlike Player | Aaron Gagnon | Seattle Thunderbirds |
| Bill Hunter Trophy | Top Defenseman | Kris Russell | Medicine Hat Tigers |
| Jim Piggott Memorial Trophy | Rookie of the Year | Kyle Beach | Everett Silvertips |
| Del Wilson Trophy | Top Goaltender | Carey Price | Tri-City Americans |
| Dunc McCallum Memorial Trophy | Coach of the Year | Cory Clouston | Kootenay Ice |
| Lloyd Saunders Memorial Trophy | Executive of the Year | Bob Tory | Tri-City Americans |
| Allen Paradice Memorial Trophy | Top Official | Andy Thiessen | |
| St. Clair Group Trophy | Marketing/Public Relations Award | Bruce Vance | Prince Albert Raiders |
| Doug Wickenheiser Memorial Trophy | Humanitarian of the Year | Kyle Moir | Swift Current Broncos |
| WHL Plus-Minus Award | Top +/- Statistic, individual | Jonathon Blum | Vancouver Giants |
| WHL Playoff MVP | Playoff Most Valuable Player | Matt Keetley | Medicine Hat Tigers |

== All-Star teams ==
Eastern Conference
| | First Team | | Second Team | |
|---|---|---|---|---|
| Goal | Matt Keetley | Medicine Hat Tigers | Taylor Dakers | Kootenay Ice |
| Defense | Kris Russell | Medicine Hat Tigers | David Schlemko | Medicine Hat Tigers |
| Defense | Mike Busto | Kootenay Ice | Karl Alzner | Calgary Hitmen |
| Forward | Ryan White | Calgary Hitmen | Zach Boychuk | Lethbridge Hurricanes |
| Forward | Steve DaSilva | Kootenay Ice | Darren Helm | Medicine Hat Tigers |
| Forward | Riley Holzapfel | Moose Jaw Warriors | Martin Hanzal | Red Deer Rebels |
Western Conference
| | First Team | | Second Team | |
| Goal | Carey Price | Tri-City Americans | Leland Irving | Everett Silvertips |
| Defense | Cody Franson | Vancouver Giants | Ty Wishart | Prince George Cougars |
| Defense | Ray Macias | Kamloops Blazers | Thomas Hickey (tied) | Seattle Thunderbirds |
| Defense | | | Jason Fransoo (tied) | Everett Silvertips |
| Forward | Aaron Gagnon | Seattle Thunderbirds | Reid Jorgensen | Kamloops Blazers |
| Forward | Peter Mueller | Everett Silvertips | Colton Yellow Horn | Tri-City Americans |
| Forward | Zach Hamill | Everett Silvertips | Brock Nixon | Kamloops Blazers |

- source: Western Hockey League press release

== 2007 Bantam draft ==
The 2007 WHL Bantam Draft was the 18th Bantam Draft. It was hosted by the Stampede Park Round-Up Centre on Thursday May 3, 2007, via the internet.

List of first round picks in the bantam draft.

| # | Player | Nationality | WHL Team |
|---|---|---|---|
| 1 | Quinton Howden (LW) | Canada | Moose Jaw Warriors (via Portland) |
| 2 | Luke Moffatt (C) | United States | Kelowna Rockets |
| 3 | Mark Pysyk (D) | Canada | Edmonton Oil Kings |
| 4 | Charles Inglis (C) | Canada | Saskatoon Blades |
| 5 | Ross Brad Ross (LW) | Canada | Portland Winter Hawks (via Moose Jaw) |
| 6 | Alex Theriau (D) | Canada | Lethbridge Hurricanes |
| 7 | Kevin Sundher (C) | Canada | Chilliwack Bruins |
| 8 | Ryan Aasman (D) | Canada | Prince Albert Raiders |
| 9 | Christian Magnus (C) | Canada | Swift Current Broncos |
| 10 | Brett Connolly (C) | Canada | Prince George Cougars |
| 11 | Connor Redmond (LW) | Canada | Red Deer Rebels |
| 12 | Michael Betz (LW) | Canada | Spokane Chiefs |
| 13 | Dominick Favreau (C) | Canada | Regina Pats |
| 14 | Austin Madaisky (D) | Canada | Calgary Hitmen |
| 15 | Brendan Ranford (LW) | Canada | Kamloops Blazers |
| 16 | Erik Fleming (D) | Canada | Seattle Thunderbirds |
| 17 | Brandon Regier (RW) | Canada | Brandon Wheat Kings |
| 18 | Mark Reners (RW) | Canada | Lethbridge Hurricanes (via Tri-City) |
| 19 | Mitch Spooner (D) | Canada | Vancouver Giants |
| 20 | Drew Czerwonka (LW) | Canada | Kootenay Ice |
| 21 | Tyler Bunz (G) | Canada | Medicine Hat Tigers |
| 22 | Kent Simpson (G) | Canada | Everett Silvertips |

== See also ==
- 2006–07 OHL season
- 2006–07 QMJHL season
- 2007 NHL entry draft
- 2006 in ice hockey
- 2007 in ice hockey

| Preceded by 2005–06 WHL season | WHL seasons | Succeeded by 2007–08 WHL season |
